= Socialist Party of America =

1901–1972 United States political party

- Founded: July 29, 1901; 125 years ago
- Dissolved: December 30, 1972; 53 years ago
- Preceded by: Populist Party; Social Democratic Party of America
- Succeeded by: Social Democrats, USA (majority; de jure); Socialist Party USA (minority); Democratic Socialist Organizing Committee (minority)
- Headquarters: Washington, D.C. (minority)
- Student wing: Intercollegiate Socialist Society (unofficial)
- Youth wing: Young People's Socialist League
- Ideology: Marxism; Social democracy; Democratic socialism; Pacifism; Industrial unionism; Anti-fascism; Anti-Stalinism; Factions: Syndicalism (IWW); Communism (Left Wing); Sewer socialism (Old Guard); Revolutionary socialism (Militant); Trotskyism (Socialist Appeal)
- Political position: Left-wing
- International affiliation: Second International (1901–1916); Labour and Socialist International (1923–1940)
- Colors: Red

The Socialist Party of America (SPA) was a socialist political party in the United States formed in 1901 by a merger between the three-year-old Social Democratic Party of America and disaffected elements of the Socialist Labor Party of America who had split from the main organization in 1899.

In the first decades of the 20th century, the SPA drew significant support from many different groups, including trade unionists, progressive social reformers, populist farmers and immigrants. Eugene V. Debs twice won over 900,000 votes in presidential elections (1912 and 1920), while the party also elected two U.S. representatives (Victor L. Berger and Meyer London), dozens of state legislators, more than 100 mayors, and countless lesser officials. The party's staunch opposition to American involvement in World War I, although welcomed by many, also led to prominent defections, official repression, and vigilante persecution. The party was further shattered by a factional war over how to respond to the October Revolution in the Russian Republic in 1917 and the establishment of the Communist International in 1919—many members left the Socialist Party to found Leninist parties including the Communist Party USA.

After endorsing Robert M. La Follette's Progressive Party in 1924, the party returned to independent action at the presidential level. It had modest growth in the early 1930s behind presidential candidate Norman Thomas. The party's appeal was weakened by the popularity of President Franklin D. Roosevelt's New Deal, the organization and flexibility of the Communist Party under Earl Browder and the resurgent labor movement's desire to support sympathetic Democratic Party politicians. A divisive and ultimately unsuccessful attempt to broaden the party by admitting followers of Leon Trotsky and Jay Lovestone caused the traditional Old Guard faction to leave and form the Social Democratic Federation. While the party was always strongly anti-fascist as well as anti-Stalinist, its opposition to American entry into World War II cost it both internal and external support.

The party stopped running presidential candidates after 1956, when its nominee, Darlington Hoopes, won fewer than 6,000 votes. In the party's last decades, its members, many of them prominent in the labor, peace, civil rights, and civil liberties movements, fundamentally disagreed about the socialist movement's relationship to the labor movement and the Democratic Party and about how best to advance democracy abroad. In 1970–1973, these strategic differences became so acute that the SPA changed its name to Social Democrats, USA, both because the term "party" in its name had confused the public and to distance itself from the Soviet Union. Leaders of two of its caucuses formed separate socialist organizations, the Socialist Party USA and the Democratic Socialist Organizing Committee, the precursor of the Democratic Socialists of America.

== History ==
=== Early history ===
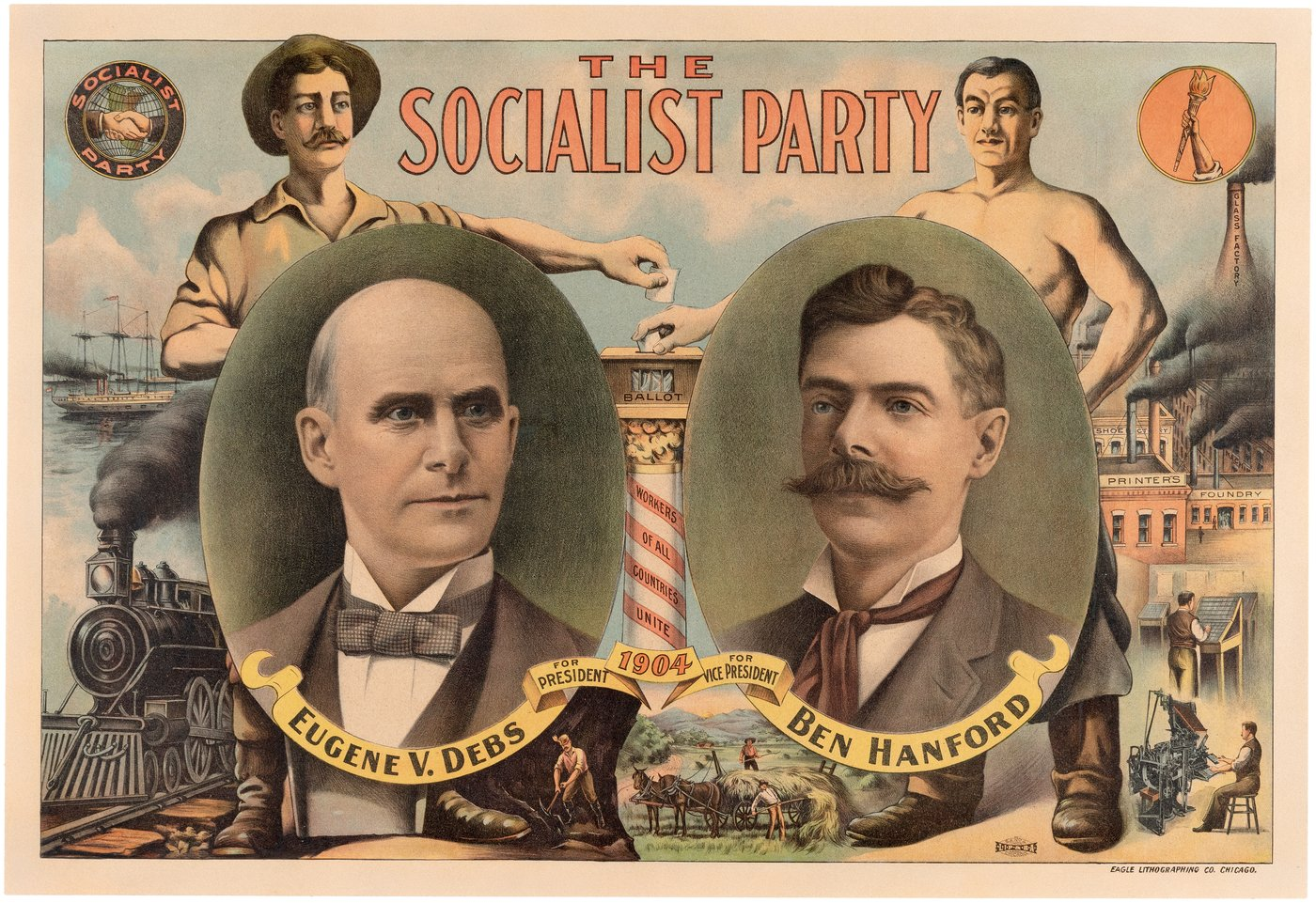
Election poster for Eugene V. Debs, Socialist Party of America candidate for President, 1904

The few own the many because they possess the means of livelihood of all. [...] The country is governed for the richest, for the corporations, the bankers, the land speculators, and for the exploiters of labor. The majority of mankind are working people. So long as their fair demands—the ownership and control of their livelihoods—are set at naught, we can have neither men's rights nor women's rights. The majority of mankind is ground down by industrial oppression in order that the small remnant may live in ease.

— Helen Keller, Socialist Party of America member, 1913

In 1901, the Socialist Party was formed by a merger between the Social Democratic Party of America (headquartered in Chicago, IL) and dissident Lassallean members of the Socialist Labor Party of America, who had also adopted the name Social Democratic Party of America (headquartered in Springfield, MA). The new party chose "socialist" over "social democratic" because the latter lost its meaning when translated from German to English.

From 1901 to the onset of World War I, the Socialist Party had numerous elected officials throughout the United States. The Mapping Social Movements Project has identified more than 1,000 elected Party members in 353 cities and towns. There were two Socialist members of Congress, Meyer London of New York City and Victor Berger of Milwaukee (a part of the sewer socialism movement, a major front in socialism, Milwaukee being the first major city to elect a socialist mayor, which it did four times between 1910 and 1956); over 70 mayors; and many state legislators and city councilors. The party was able to successfully run candidates in smaller municipalities as well as big cities, winning the mayoralty of Butte, Montana, with Lewis Duncan and that of Schenectady, New York, with George R. Lunn. Its voting strength was greatest among recent Jewish, Finnish and German immigrants, coal miners and former populist farmers in the Midwest. According to Jimmy Weinstein, its electoral base was strongest west of the Mississippi River, "in the states where mining, lumbering, and tenant farming prevailed". It was also able to attract support from railroad workers. Its vote shares were highest in Oklahoma, Nevada, Montana, Washington, California, Idaho, Florida, Arizona and Wisconsin, and it also attracted support in Texas, Arkansas and Kansas. From 1900 (before its formal union) to 1912, it ran Eugene V. Debs for president at each election. The best showing ever for a socialist ticket was in 1912, when Debs gained 901,551 total votes, 6% of the popular vote. In 1920, Debs ran again, this time while imprisoned for opposing World War I, and received 913,693 votes, 3.4% of the total.

Early political perspectives ranged from radical socialism to social democracy. Victor Berger and New York party leader Morris Hillquit sat on the party's more social democratic or right-wing side. Radical socialists and syndicalists, including Debs and members of the Industrial Workers of the World (IWW), sat on the left. There were also agrarian utopian-leaning radicals, such as Julius Wayland of Kansas, who edited the party's leading national newspaper, Appeal to Reason, along with trade unionists; Jewish, Finnish and German immigrants; and intellectuals such as Walter Lippmann and the Black activist/intellectual Hubert Harrison. The party outsourced its newspapers and publications so that it would not have an internal editorial board that was a power in its own right. As a result, a handful of outside publishers dominated the published messages the party distributed and agitated for a much more radical anti-capitalist revolutionary message than the party itself tolerated. The Appeal to Reason newspaper thus became part of its radical left wing as did the Charles H. Kerr Publishing Company of Chicago, which produced over half of the pamphlets and books that were sold at party meetings.

Approaches to agriculture and farmers' interests were subject to significant debate in the party. While members in most parts of the country advocated collective farming, the Texas and Oklahoma state parties supported populist policies based on small-scale farm ownership, which socialists elsewhere considered economically backward. The populist position was backed by Algie Martin Simons, who argued that small farmers were not being eradicated under capitalist pressure as many socialists believed, but that they were "a permanent factor in the agricultural life in America" and that socialist and labor movements needed to attract their support to advance working-class interests. After disappointing performances in the 1908 elections when it ran on an under-developed agrarian platform based on land collectivization, in 1912 the party adopted a program of reforms including state-backed agricultural cooperatives, socialization of transport, storage and processing facilities, progressive land taxes, and government-supported land leases for small farmers.

Positions in the party on racial segregation varied and were the subject of heated debate from its foundation to the 1919 split. At its founding convention, a resolution was presented in favor of "equal rights for all human beings without distinction of color, race or sex", specifically highlighting African Americans as particularly oppressed and exploited and calling for them to be organized by the socialist and labor movements. This was opposed by a number of white delegates, who argued that specific appeals to black workers were unnecessary. Two of the black delegates present agreed with this position, but the third, William Costley, held that blacks were in "a distinct and peculiar position in contradiction to other laboring elements in the United States". Costley introduced his own resolution, which also condemned the campaign of "lynching, burning and disenfranchisement" that black Americans suffered. His resolution passed, albeit with the language on "lynching, burning, and disenfranchisement" removed.

While the resolution enshrined a commitment to opposing racism, sections of the party continued to argue against that. For example, Victor Berger drew on scientific racism to claim that blacks and mulattoes "constitute[d] a lower race". They were opposed by others who defended the spirit of the resolution, most notably Debs. This spread of opinion was reflected in the drawing up of constitutions by state parties in the South. The Socialist Party of Louisiana initially adopted a "Negro clause" that opposed disenfranchisement of blacks, but it supported segregation. The clause was supported by some Southern socialists and opposed by others, although this was not because of its accommodation of racism as such, but because it officially enshrined this accommodation. The party's National Committee persuaded the Louisiana party to withdraw the clause, but when the state party subsequently established segregated branches, the wider party did not object. Segregated locals could also be found in state parties in Texas and elsewhere. When Texas socialists established a Land Renters' Union in 1911, they initially banned black tenants from joining, before later setting up segregated locals for black and brown farmers.

Elsewhere, the 1912 platform of the Tennessee party stated that white supremacist ideology was a tool of the capitalist class to divide and rule the working class, while the Virginia party passed a resolution three years earlier to focus more attention on encouraging solidarity between black and white workers and to invite nonwhite workers to join the party. Most notable was the Socialist Party of Oklahoma, which led opposition to the state's 1910 ballot initiative on a grandfather clause to prevent blacks from voting. Prominent party member Oscar Ameringer wrote the ballot argument against it, and the party launched an unsuccessful lawsuit to prevent the question from going to the ballot. Party propaganda argued that if working-class solidarity did not extend across racial lines, then the ruling class would exploit blacks as strikebreakers and an instrument of repression. The state party's 1912 platform stated: "safety and advancement of the working class depends upon its solidarity and class consciousness. Those who would engender or foster race hatred or animosity between the white and black sections of the working class are the enemies of both." This stance earned the party support from key black leaders in the state. In the Southwest, the non-racial United Mine Workers aided black recruitment into the party. Notable figures associated with the party who sought to organize white, black and indigenous workers across color lines through their party or labor movement work included Ameringer, Covington Hall, and Otto Branstetter.

More widely, anti-racist socialists were spurred to action by the Springfield race riot of 1908. Socialist writer William English Walling's reporting on the riot inspired another socialist, Mary White Ovington, among others, to work with prominent black leaders such as W. E. B. Du Bois, Ida B. Wells, and Mary Church Terrell to establish the National Association for the Advancement of Colored People. Walling and Ovington both argued inside the party that it had not done enough to oppose racism and they were joined by other left-wing intellectuals who published articles in the party press about the importance of anti-racism to the socialist cause, including Hubert Harrison and I. M. Rubinow.

=== Growth and membership ===
The party's membership rose by over 50,000 from 1901 to 1910. The party had 4,320 members in 1901, 20,763 in 1904, 41,751 in 1908, and 58,011 in 1910. That number doubled during the Debs campaign of 1912, reaching a peak paid membership of 113,371. Membership declined to 82,313 in 1916 but stayed at almost that level through World War I. The party reported 77,647 members in 1919, just before the Communist split.

Supporting this growth was a vast network of Socialist newspapers serving more than 100 cities and towns and publishing in 18 languages. Some were short-lived and managed only small circulations, but others were successful enterprises with national circulations. Most famous were the Appeal to Reason, which at one point claimed more than 700,000 subscribers; National Rip-Saw (150,000); and Jewish Daily Forward (140,000).

=== Syndicalism vs. Socialism ===
The party had a tense and complicated relationship with the American Federation of Labor (AFL). AFL leadership, headed by Samuel Gompers, strongly opposed the Socialist Party, but many rank-and-file unionists in the early 20th century saw the Socialists as reliable political allies. Many moderate Socialists, such as Berger and International Typographical Union President Max S. Hayes, urged close cooperation with the AFL and its member unions. Others in the Socialist Party dismissed the AFL and its craft unions as antiquated and irrelevant, instead favoring the much more radical IWW and the "syndicalist" path to socialism.

In 1911, IWW leader Bill Haywood was elected to the National Executive Committee of the Socialist Party, on which AFL partisan Morris Hillquit also served. The syndicalist and the electoral socialist squared off in a lively public debate in New York City's Cooper Union on January 11, 1912, with Haywood declaring that Hillquit and the Socialists ought to try "a little sabotage in the right place at the proper time" and attacking Hillquit for having abandoned the class struggle by helping the New York garment workers negotiate an industrial agreement with their employers. Hillquit replied that he had no new message other than to reiterate a belief in a two-sided workers' movement, with separate and equal political and trade union arms. "A mere change of structural forms would not revolutionize the American labor movement as claimed by our extreme industrialists", he declared.

The issue of "syndicalism vs. socialism" was bitterly fought over the next two years, consummated by Haywood's recall from the Socialist Party's National Executive Committee (NEC) and the departure of a broad section of the left wing from the organization. The memory of this split made the intraparty battles of 1919–1921 all the more bitter.

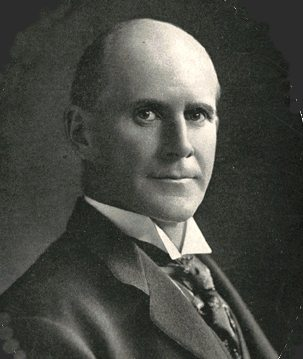
Debs was the founding member of the Socialist Party of America.

The party's opposition to World War I caused a sharp decline in membership. It suffered from the Postmaster General's decision to refuse to allow the delivery of party newspapers and periodicals via the U.S. mail, severely disrupting the party's activity, particularly in rural areas. Radicals moved further left into the IWW or the Communist Party USA. Members who supported the war effort quit, ranging from the rank and file to prominent intellectuals such as Walter Lippmann, John Spargo, James Graham Phelps Stokes and William English Walling. Some briefly formed the National Party in an unrealized hope of merging with the remnants of Theodore Roosevelt's Progressive Party and the Prohibition Party. Official membership fell from 83,284 in 1916 to 74,519 in 1918. By 1918, the Socialist Party had won 1,200 political offices, including U.S. representative, 32 state representatives and 79 mayors. It gained new votes in ethnic strongholds such as Milwaukee and New York from conservative German Americans who also opposed the war.

From 1912 to 1938, the party ran more candidates for seats in the United States House of Representatives than any other minor party, with its height being 358 candidates in the 1912 elections. Sixteen Socialist candidates in the 1912 House elections received over 20% of the popular vote and five of those received over 30%.

In June 1918, Debs made an anti-draft speech, calling for draft resistance. Urging young men to ignore the draft law was a crime under the Sedition Act of 1918 and Debs was convicted and sentenced to serve ten years in prison. President Warren G. Harding commuted his and two dozen others' sentences at Christmastime 1921.

=== Victor Berger in Milwaukee ===
According to historian Sally Miller, Victor Berger:

built the most successful socialist machine ever to dominate an American city....[He] concentrated on national politics...to become one of the most powerful voices in the reformist wing of the national Socialist party. His commitment to democratic values and the non-violent socialization of the American system led the party away from revolutionary Marxist dogma. He shaped the party into force which, while struggling against its own left wing, symbolize participation in the political order to attain social reforms. ... In the party schism of 1919, Berger opposed allegiance to the emergent Soviet system. His shrunken party echoed his preference for peaceful, democratic, and gradual transformation to socialism.

=== Split of the Left Wing Section ===
In January 1919, Vladimir Lenin invited the IWW and the radical wing of the Socialist Party to join in the founding of the Communist Third International, the Comintern. The Left Wing Section of the Socialist Party emerged as an organized faction early that year, building its organization around a lengthy Left Wing Manifesto by Louis C. Fraina. This effort to organize in order to "win the Socialist Party for the Left Wing" was staunchly resisted by the "Regulars", who controlled a big majority of the seats of the Socialist Party's governing NEC. When it seemed certain that the 1919 party elections for a new NEC had been dominated by the Left Wing, the sitting NEC, citing voting irregularities, refused to tally the votes, declared the entire election invalid and in May 1919 suspended the party's Russian, Latvian, Ukrainian, Polish, South Slavic and Hungarian language federations, in addition to Michigan's entire state organization. In future weeks, Massachusetts's and Ohio's state organizations were similarly disfranchised and "reorganized" by the NEC, while in New York and Pennsylvania the "Regular" State Executive Committees undertook reorganization of Left Wing branches and locals on a case-by-case basis.

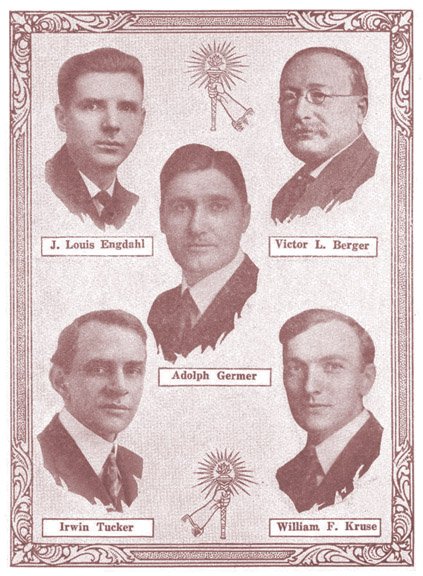
Executive Secretary Adolph Germer was one of top five Socialist of America leaders prosecuted by the Department of Justice in 1919.

In June 1919, the Left Wing Section held a conference in New York City to discuss its organizational plans. The group found itself deeply divided, with one section, led by NEC members Alfred Wagenknecht and L. E. Katterfeld and including famed radical journalist John Reed favoring a continued effort to gain control of the SPA at its forthcoming Emergency National Convention in Chicago, to be held at the end of August, while another section, headed by the Russian Socialist Federation of Alexander Stoklitsky and Nicholas Hourwich and the Socialist Party of Michigan seeking to wash its hands of the Socialist Party and immediately move to establish a new Communist Party of America. Eventually, this latter Federation-dominated group was joined by important Left Wingers C. E. Ruthenberg and Louis Fraina, a depletion of Left Wing forces that made the result of the 1919 Socialist Convention a foregone conclusion.

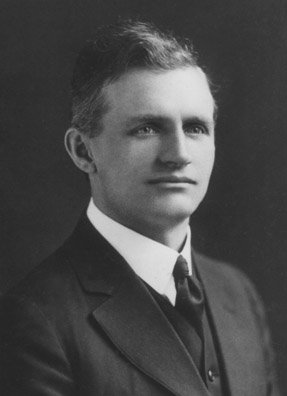
Alfred Wagenknecht, top leader of the 1919 Left Wing Section of the Socialist Party

Regardless, Wagenknecht's and Reed's plans to fight it out at the 1919 Emergency National Convention continued apace. With the most radical state organizations effectively purged by the Regulars (Massachusetts, Minnesota) or unable to participate (Ohio, Michigan) and the Left Wing language federations suspended, a big majority of the hastily elected delegates to the gathering were controlled by the Executive Secretary Adolph Germer and the Regulars. A group of Left Wingers without delegate credentials, including Reed and his sidekick Benjamin Gitlow, made an effort to occupy chairs on the convention floor before the gathering was called into order. The incumbents were unable to block the Left Wingers at the door, but soon called to their aid the already present police, who obligingly expelled the boisterous radicals from the hall. With the Credentials Committee firmly in the hands of the Regulars from the outset, the gathering's outcome was no longer in doubt and most of the remaining Left Wing delegates departed, to meet with other co-thinkers downstairs in a previously reserved room in a parallel convention. It was this gathering that established itself as the Communist Labor Party on August 31, 1919.

Meanwhile, elsewhere in Chicago, the Federations and Michiganders and their supporters established the Communist Party of America at a convention gaveled to order on September 1, 1919. Unity between these two communist organizations was a lengthy and complicated process, formally taking place at a secret convention held at the Overlook Mountain House hotel near Woodstock, New York, in May 1921 with the establishment of a new unified Communist Party of America. A Left Wing loyal to the Communist International remained in the Socialist Party through 1921, continuing the fight to bring the Socialist Party into the ranks of the Comintern. This group, which opposed the underground secret organizations the Communist Parties had become, included noted party journalist J. Louis Engdahl and William Kruse, head of the party's youth affiliate, the Young People's Socialist League, as well as a significant segment of the Socialist Party's Chicago organization. These left-wing dissidents continued to make themselves heard until their departure from the party after the 1921 convention.

=== Expulsion of Socialists from the New York Assembly ===
On January 7, 1920, less than a week after the Palmer Raids had swept and stunned the country, the New York Assembly was called to order. The majority Republicans easily elected their candidate for the Speaker, Thaddeus C. Sweet and after opening day formalities the body took a brief recess. Back in session, Sweet declared: "The Chair directs the Sergeant-at-Arms to present before the bar of the House Samuel A. DeWitt, Samuel Orr, Louis Waldman, Charles Solomon, and August Claessens", the Assembly's five Socialist members.

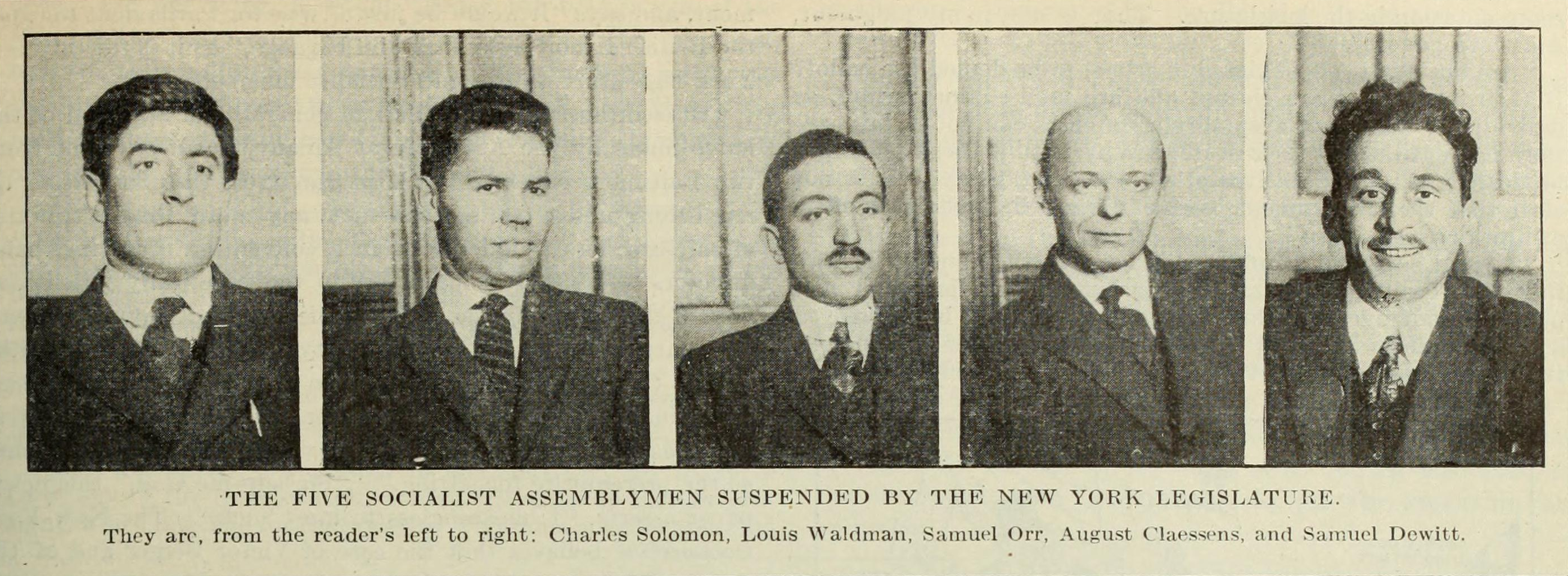
The five Socialist assemblymen suspended by the New York Legislature in January 1920

Sweet attacked the five, declaring they had been "elected on a platform that is absolutely inimical to the best interests of the state of New York and the United States". The Socialist Party, Sweet said, was "not truly a political party", but rather "a membership organization admitting within its ranks aliens, enemy aliens, and minors". The party had denounced America's participation in the European war and had lent aid and comfort to Ludwig Martens, the "self-styled Soviet Ambassador and alien, who entered this country as a German in 1916". It had supported the revolutionaries in Germany, Austria and Hungary, Sweet continued; and consorted with international Socialist parties close to the Communist International. Sweet concluded:

It is every citizen's right to his day in court. If this house should adopt a resolution declaring your seat herein vacant, pending a hearing before a tribunal of this house, you will be given an opportunity to appear before such tribunal to prove your right to a seat in this legislative body, and upon the result of such hearing and the findings of the Assembly tribunal, your right to participate in the actions of this body will be determined.

The Assembly suspended the quintet by a vote of 140 to 6, with one Democrat supporting the Socialists. Civil libertarians and concerned citizens raised their voices to aid the suspended Socialists and protest percolated throughout the press. The principal argument was that the expulsion of elected members of minority parties by majority parties from their councils set a dangerous precedent in a democracy. The battle culminated in a highly publicized trial in the Assembly, which dominated the body's activity from its opening on January 20, 1920, until its conclusion on March 11. Socialist Party leader and former 1917 New York City mayoral candidate Morris Hillquit served as chief counsel for the suspended Socialists, aided by party founder and future Socialist vice-presidential candidate Seymour Stedman.

At the trial, Hillquit charged that Sweet had made a "specific, concrete, definite, affirmative declaration of guilt" of the five Assemblymen before they were ever charged with any offense. It was also Sweet who appointed the members of the Judiciary Committee to which the matter was referred. "Thus the accuser selects his own judges", Hillquit declared. Hillquit sought to remove for reasons of bias any members of the Judiciary Committee who had taken part in the activities of the Lusk Committee, the New York State Senate's anti-radicalism committee. He particularly challenged the presence of Assemblyman Louis A. Cuvillier, who had stated on the floor of the house the previous night words to the effect that "if the five accused Assemblymen are found guilty, they ought not to be expelled, but taken out and shot". The Assembly voted overwhelmingly for expulsion on April 1, 1920.

On September 16, 1920, a special election was held to fill the five seats vacated by the Assembly, with each of the five expelled Socialists running for reelection against a "fusion" candidate representing the combined Republican and Democratic parties. All five Socialists were returned to office.

Three of the five, Waldman, Claessens and Solomon, were again denied their seats after a contentious debate by votes of 90 to 45 on September 21, 1920. Orr and DeWitt, deemed less culpable than their peers by the earlier findings of the Judiciary Committee, were seated by votes of 87 to 48. In solidarity with their ousted colleagues, the pair refused to take their seats.

After the five seats were again vacated, Hillquit expressed his disappointment at the Assembly's "unconstitutional action". But, he continued, "it will draw the issues clearer between the united Republican and Democratic parties representing arbitrary lawlessness, and the Socialist Party, which stood and stands for democratic and representative government".

The legislature attempted to prevent the election and seating of Socialists in the future by passing laws designed to exclude the Socialist Party from recognition as a political party and to alter the legislature's oath-taking procedures so that elected members could be excluded before being sworn. Governor Al Smith vetoed the legislation.

=== Quest for a mass Farmer–Labor Party ===
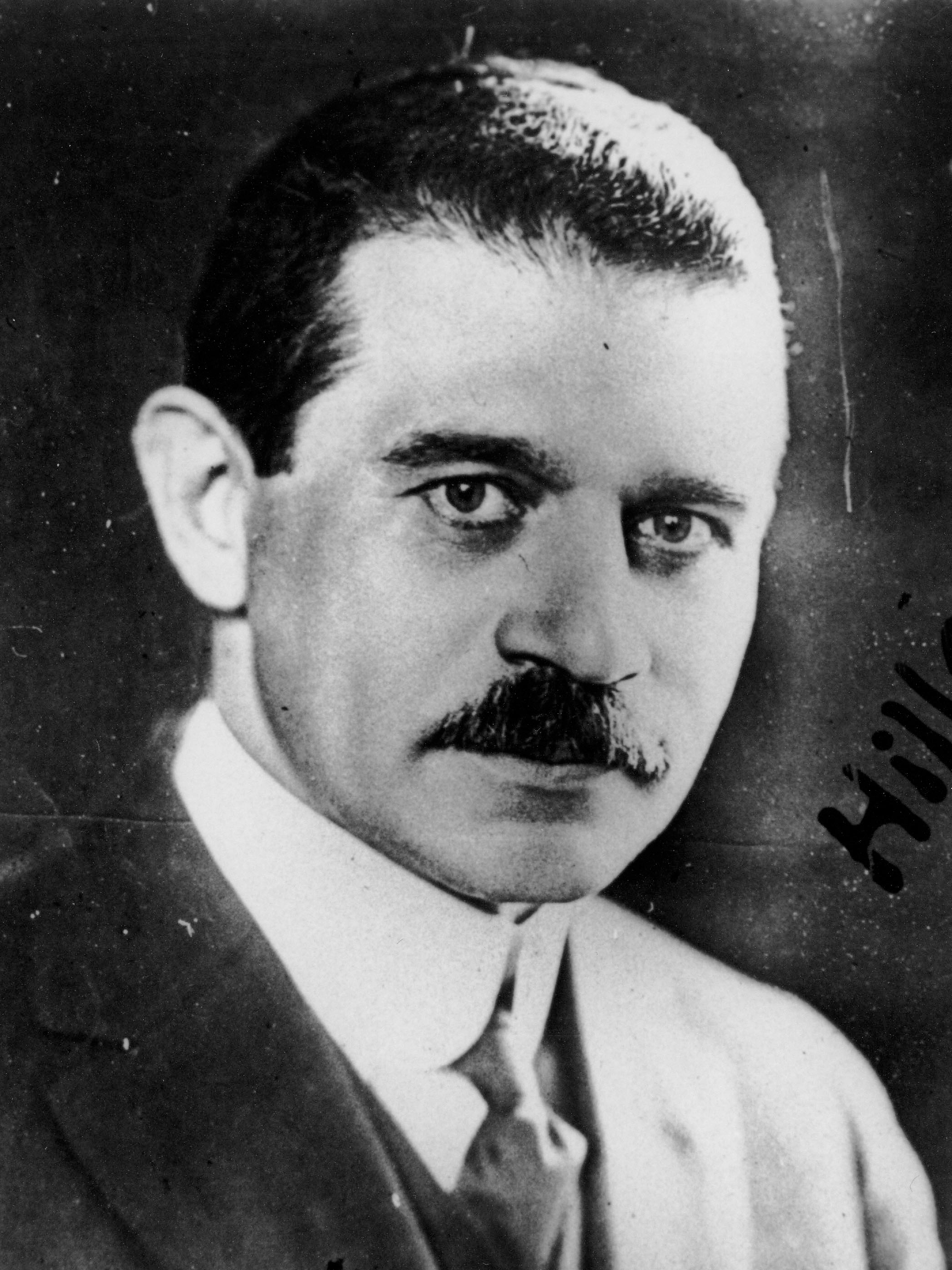
Morris Hillquit, Chairman of the Socialist Party of America from the death of Berger until he himself died in 1933

In the first half of 1919, the Socialist Party had over 77,000 dues-paying members, and by the second half of 1921 it had been shattered. Fewer than 14,000 members remained in party ranks, with the departure of the large, well-funded Finnish Socialist Federation adding to the malaise. Membership numbers soon fell below 10,000 and remained there until 1932. In September 1921, the NEC determined that the time had come to end the party's historic aversion to fusion with other political organizations and issue an appeal declaring that the "forces of every progressive, liberal, and radical organization of the workers must be mobilized" to repel conservative assaults and "advance the industrial and political power of the working class".

This desire for common action seems to have been shared by various unions, as late in 1921 a call was issued in the name of the country's 16 major railway labor unions seeking a Conference for Progressive Political Action (CPPA). The CPPA was originally intended to be an umbrella organization bringing together various elements of the farmer and labor movement together in a common program. Invitations to the group's founding conference were issued to members of a wide variety of "progressive" organizations of widely varied perspectives. As a result, from its inception the heterogeneous body was unable to agree on a program or a declaration of principles, let alone congeal into a new political party.

The Socialist Party was an enthusiastic supporter of the CPPA and the group dominated its thinking from the start of 1922 through the first quarter of 1925. In this period of organizational weakness, the party sought to forge lasting ties with the existing trade union movement, leading in short order to a mass labor party in the United States on the British model.

A first National Conference of the CPPA was held in Chicago in February 1922, attended by 124 delegates representing a broad spectrum of labor, farmer and political organizations. The gathering passed an "Address to the American People" stating its criticism of existing conditions and formally proposing an amorphous plan of action validating the status quo ante: the labor unions on the group's right wing to endorse labor-friendly candidates of the Democratic Party, the Socialists and Farmer-Labor Party adherents on the group's left wing to conduct their own independent campaigns. From the Socialist Party's perspective, perhaps the most important thing the CPPA did at its first National Conference was agree to meet again. The party leadership understood the process of building an independent third party that could count on the allegiance of the country's trade union leadership would be a protracted process and the mere fact of "agreement to disagree" but nevertheless meeting again was regarded as a step forward.

The communist movement also sought to pursue the strategy of bursting from its isolation by forming a mass Farmer-Labor Party. Finally emerged from its underground existence in 1922, the Communists, through their "legal political party", the Workers Party of America, sent four delegates to the CPPA's December 1922 gathering. But after protracted debate, the Credentials Committee strongly objected to the participation of Communist representatives in its proceedings and issued a recommendation that Workers Party's representatives and youth organization not be seated. The Socialist Party's delegates strongly supported excluding the Communists and acted accordingly, even though the two organizations shared a vision of a party akin to the British Labour Party in which constituent political groups jointly participated while retaining their independent existence. The fissure between the organizations thus widened.

As with the first conference, the 2nd Conference of the CPPA split over the all-important issue of an independent political party, with a proposal by five delegates of the Farmer-Labor Party calling for "independent political action by the agricultural and industrial workers through a party of their own" defeated by a vote of 52 to 64. A majority report declaring against an independent political party was instead adopted. This defeat of the bid for an independent political party cost the CPPA one its major component organizations, with the Farmer-Labor Party delegation announcing that its group would no longer affiliate with the CPPA after the convention. Although the Socialists did not realize it at the time, the chances that the organization would ever be transformed into an authentic mass Farmer-Labor party like British Labour were greatly lessened by the FLP's departure.

The Socialists remained optimistic, and the May 1923 National Convention of the Socialist Party voted after lengthy debate to retain its affiliation with the CPPA and to continue its work for an independent political party from within that group. The May 20 vote in favor of maintaining affiliation with the CPPA was 38–12. Failing a mass farmer-labor party from the CPPA, the Socialists sought at least a powerful presidential nominee to run in opposition to the old parties. A 3rd National Conference of the CPPA was held in St. Louis, Missouri, on February 11 and 12, 1924, a gathering that punted on the issue of committing itself to the 1924 presidential campaign, deciding instead to "immediately issue a call for a convention of workers, farmers, and progressives for the purpose of taking action on nomination of candidates for the offices of President and Vice President of the United States, and on other questions that may come before the convention".

The decisive moment finally came on July 4, 1924, a date that was not selected accidentally. The 1st National Convention of the CPPA was assembled in Cleveland at the city auditorium, which was packed with close to 600 delegates representing international unions, state federations of labor, branches of cooperative societies, state branches and national officers of the Socialist, Farmer-Labor and Progressive Parties as well as the Committee of 48, state and national affiliates of the Women's Committee on Political Action and sundry individuals. Very few farmers were in attendance.

It was around this time that the Socialists began actively participating in discussions about democratic principles as much as Marxist ones. By 1924, they supported the Progressive Party ticket, which pushed for the reform of the Democratic Party. Ten years after that, the American Socialists adopted a "clearly undemocratic, quasi-Leninist platform" that lobbied for the removal of the current "bogus democracy of capitalist parliamentarianism". Wanting the government to be replaced by a "genuine worker's democracy", the American Socialist Party stated that "whether or not it is a majority, will not shrink from the responsibility of organizing and maintaining a government under the workers' rule". This was seen as an attempt to propose a political reform that would ultimately result in a better social and economic reform consistent with their beliefs.

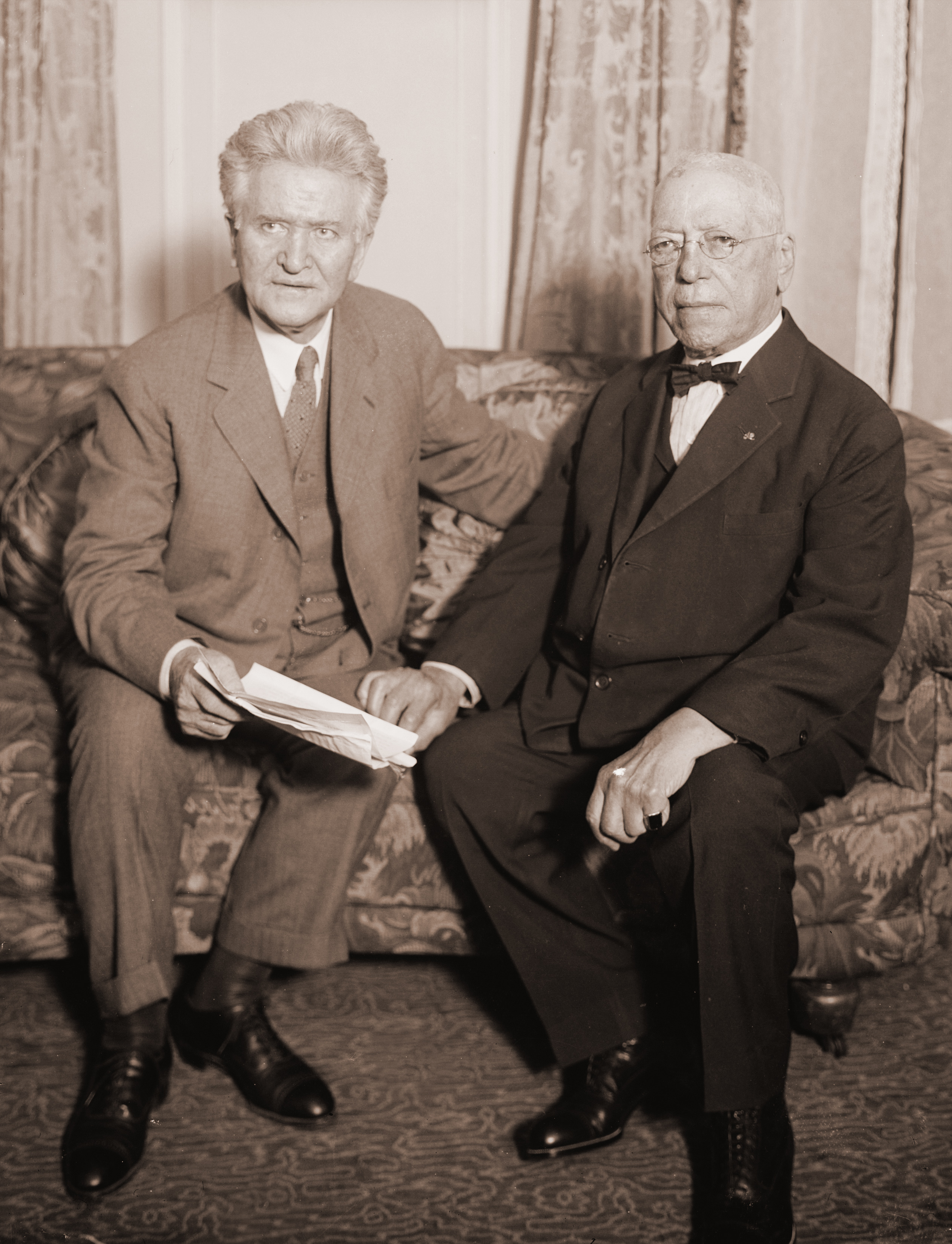
Socialist Party of America ally Robert M. La Follette (left) attempted to build a broad labor alliance during the 1924 campaign and here meets with Samuel Gompers of the American Federation of Labor.

The National Committee had previously requested that Wisconsin Senator Robert M. La Follette run for president. The Cleveland Convention was addressed by La Follette's son, Robert M. La Follette Jr., who read a message from his father accepting the call and declaring that the time had come "for a militant political movement independent of the two old party organizations". But La Follette declined to lead a third party, seeking to protect those progressives elected nominally as Republicans and Democrats. He said that the primary issue of the 1924 campaign was breaking the "combined power of the private monopoly system over the political and economic life of the American people". After the November election a new party might well be established, La Follette said, that might unite all progressives.

The Socialist Party enthusiastically supported La Follette's independent candidacy, declining to run its own candidate in 1924. Although La Follette garnered five million votes, his campaign failed to seriously challenge the old parties' hegemony and was regarded by the unions as a disappointing failure.

After the election, the governing National Committee of the CPPA met in Washington, D.C. While the body had a mandate from the July convention to issue a call for a convention to organize a new political party, the representatives of the critical railway unions, with the exception of William H. Johnston of the Machinists, were united in opposition to the idea. The railroad unions instead proposed a motion not to hold the 1925 organizational convention. This proposal was defeated by a vote of 30 to 13. After their defeat on this question, the railroaders on National Committee members withdrew from the meeting, announcing that they would await further instructions from their respective organizations with regard to future participation. The loss of the very unions that had brought about the CPPA spelled its demise.

The National Committee nonetheless scheduled a convention to decide on the formation of a new political party for February 21, 1925, to be held in Chicago. Labor, the official organ of the railway unions, did nothing to promote this 2nd Convention of the CPPA, stating that since the executives of the various unions had taken no stance on the matter, it would be up to subordinate sections to consider sending delegates themselves.

The February 1925 convention found its task virtually insurmountable as the heterogeneous organization had split over the fundamental question of realignment of the major parties via the primary elections process as opposed to establishment of a new competitive political party. The railway unions, whose efforts who had originally brought the CPPA into existence, were fairly solidly united against the Third Party tactic, instead favoring continuation of the CPPA as a sort of pressure group for progressive change within the Democratic and Republican parties.

L. E. Sheppard, president of the Order of Railway Conductors of America, presented a resolution calling for a continuation of the CPPA on non-partisan lines as a political pressure group. This proposal was met by an amendment by Morris Hillquit of the Socialist Party, who called the five million votes cast for La Follette an encouraging beginning and urged action for establishment of an American Labor Party on the British model—in which constituent groups retained their organizational autonomy within the larger umbrella organization. A third proposal was made by J.A.H. Hopkins of the Committee of Forty-Eight, which called for establishment of a Progressive Party built around individual enrollments. No vote was ever taken by the convention on any of the three proposals mooted. Instead, after some debate the convention was unanimously adjourned sine die—bringing an abrupt end to the Conference for Progressive Political Action.

Debs addressed a "mass meeting" including delegates of the convention in a keynote address delivered at the Lexington Hotel early in the afternoon of February 21. After his speech, those delegates favoring establishment of a new political party reconvened, with the opponents of an independent political party departing. The reconvened Founding Convention found itself split between adherents of a non-class Progressive Party based upon individual memberships as opposed to the Socialists' conception of a class-conscious Labor Party employing "direct affiliation" of "organizations of workers and farmers and of progressive political and educational groups who fully accept its program and principles". After extensive debate, the Socialist counterproposal was defeated by a vote of 93 to 64. The trade unions it coveted gone, the farmers nonexistent, the Socialist Party exited the convention and abandoned the strategy of establishing a new mass party through the CPPA. The remaining liberals formed a Progressive Party that survived for a short time in a limited number of states throughout the 1920s.

=== Left turn and split of the Old Guard ===
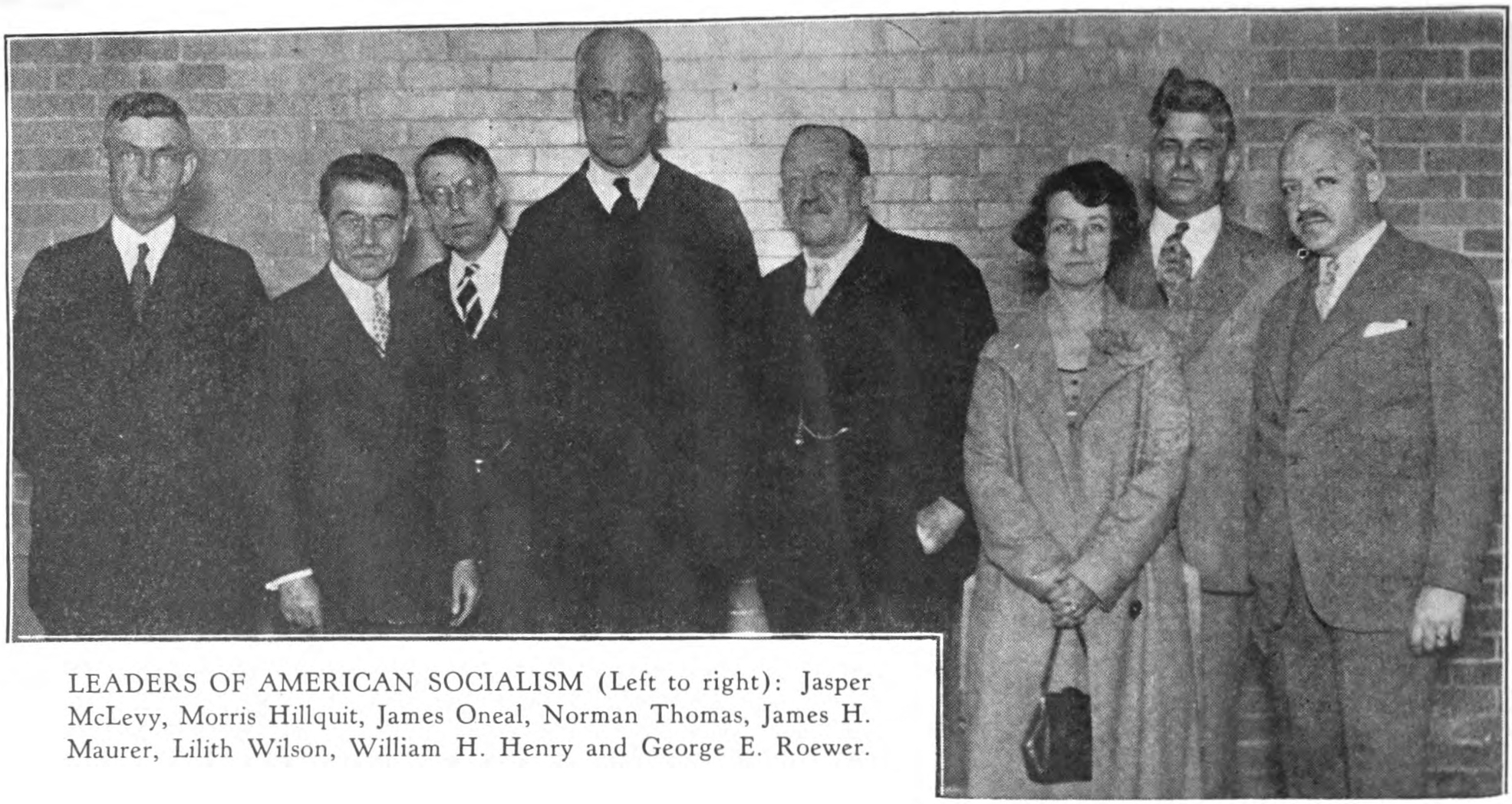
"Leaders of American Socialism" in 1928. (L-R): Jasper McLevy, Morris Hillquit, James Oneal, Norman Thomas, James H. Maurer, Lilith Martin Wilson, William H. Henry, George E. Roewer.

In 1928, the Socialist Party returned as an independent electoral entity under the leadership of Norman Thomas, a radical Protestant minister from New York City. This reentry into the electoral fray behind Thomas fueled major growth of the party during the first years of Great Depression, primarily among youth. A skilled orator and advocate of step-by-step solution of social problems, Thomas had excellent access to churches, colleges and civic institutions. He also had, as New York social democrat Louis Waldman later noted, "those qualities of mind and character which appealed to the intelligent and educated young people of the country and which drew them into the ranks of the party in unprecedented numbers".

The 1928 convention voted to reduce membership dues to just $1 per year, with only half that sum going to the use of the National Office and the balance retained by state and local organizations. This level of funding proved insufficient for anything beyond the bare minimum of operations by the National Office in Chicago—no official party publication was made available to the members of the organization, with several privately held socialist newspapers fulfilling the function as fonts of party information.

The dues rate cut did prove helpful in reducing the party's membership slide. After nearly a decade of steady decline, the Socialist Party again began to grow, advancing from a low of under 8,000 dues payers in 1928 to a membership of almost 17,000 by 1932. But this growth came at a price, as deep factional divisions developed between the youthful newcomers (radicalized and drawn to militant Marxism by the world economic crisis) and the "Old Guard" headed by Morris Hillquit, James Oneal and Waldman.

The generational battle first erupted at the May 1932 Milwaukee Convention. Participant Anna Bercowitz noted four primary factions at this gathering, i.e. an Old Guard defending the current course of the party and the position of Hillquit, practical Socialists of the Milwaukee type, the young Marxist Militants and liberal pacifist Thomasites such as Devere Allen who followed Thomas's lead.

The groups which represented the so-called 'New Blood' at the convention, the Militants and the Liberals and which at this convention merged for the sole purpose of deposing the present leadership [of the party] had little in common. Many members of the most aggressive, although numerically weakest of these groups, the Militants, had little in common with the so-called Thomasites. ... And as for the so-called Mid-western group, although they cast their vote with the opposition, on fundamentals they too are opposed to much of the liberalizing tendencies manifest in the party in recent years. Yet they voted, contrary to their usual procedure in their respective communities, with the opposition. That trades had been made there can be no doubt, and that some groups had been used as innocent dupes can also hardly be doubted...

Fundamentally there is much more in common between the Militants and the so-called 'Old Guard' than between the Militants and the [religious pacifist] Thomasites and surely than between the frank practical 'mid-western' type of Socialists, yet when it was a question of vote on the Russian resolution, on the TU [Trade Union] resolution and on the question of the National Chairman and the Executive Committee votes were not cast on the basis of principles but apparently on the basis of 'trades'. The real difference between the Militants and the 'Old Guard' seems to be based on lack of sufficient activity and on tempo rather than on principle.

Hillquit was challenged at the 1932 convention by Daniel Hoan of Milwaukee, with the Militants and the Thomas group voting for Hoan with the Midwesterners. Hillquit was reelected National Chairman by a vote of 105–86, representing paid memberships of 7526 to 6984. Six members of the newly elected NEC were adherents of the Hillquit-Old Guard faction. It is clear that to some large extent the controversy between the young newcomers of the Militant faction and that of the so-called Old Guard can be reduced to this struggle for practical control of the party apparatus. Historian Frank Warren notes that "one cannot understand the Old Guard's actions unless one recognizes its intense desire to maintain its place in the party hierarchy; the drives of the young were a threat to the power of the New York Old Guard." He also adds that "clearly one would falsely idealize the Militants if one failed to recognize that their ambitions were not always selfless".

In addition to the raw struggle for control of the party apparatus, there was also a divergence of visions about the role of the Socialist Party in the then-current crisis of capitalism, with mass unemployment at home and the growth of fascism and militarism abroad. The alternative vision of the Militants would be expressed at the subsequent convention of the party held in Detroit in June 1934, at which it was Thomas and his tactical allies of the Militant faction who emerged triumphant. It was this gathering that adopted a new Declaration of Principles that inflamed the Old Guard faction on a number of different levels.

Louis Waldman, a top leader of the Old Guard

The ideological differences between the radical pacifist Thomas and his allies of the Militant faction on the one hand and the Old Guard faction on the other have been succinctly summarized as follows:

The Old Guard was convinced that the 1934 Declaration of Principles was an open declaration in favor of armed insurrection; Thomas believed it was a necessary statement to indicate that Socialists would not lie down in the face of fascism. The Old Guard believed that the anti-war sections of the Declaration of Principles placed the party under the threat of legal prosecution for advocating unlawful actions to oppose war; again Thomas believed that a strong statement was necessary to put capitalism on warning that if it engaged in imperialist war there would be opposition. The Old Guard believed that a united front with the Communists was immoral and would be disastrous for the Socialists, that even limited united action on specific causes should be banned, and even that exploratory discussions about a united front were going too far. Thomas opposed a united front on a general level, including any joint actions in political contests, but he thought that carefully planned united action on specific cases could, and should, take place. And he believed that it was worth while to conduct exploratory talks, even though he felt they would likely lead to nothing. The Old Guard felt that the Socialists' invitation to unaffiliated radicals and the Party's acceptance of former Communists, Lovestoneites, and Trotskyists was turning the party away from democratic socialism and to Communism. Thomas, though he disagreed with the ideology of these anti-Stalinist Communists, was willing to try to work with a party that included them, if they were willing to accept party discipline and not try to take over the Party. The Old Guard considered the Revolutionary Policy Committee, a far-left group within the Socialist Party, a Communist and anarchist group that had no place in a democratic socialist party. Thomas disagreed with the 'romantic revolutionists' in the Revolutionary Policy Committee (as he disagreed with the 'romantic parliamentarians' of the Old Guard), but still felt it was useful to try to salvage some of the enthusiasm and dedication that went into the Revolutionary Policy Committee by permitting its members to remain in the Party if, again, they followed party policy and party discipline.

In addition to the generational and ideological differences between the young Militant faction and the Old Guard and their divergence over tempo of activity and party personnel was great disagreement about matters of symbolism and style. Many of the young radicals dressed and acted in marked contrast to their staid, buttoned-down elders, as New York Old Guard leader Louis Waldman recounted in a 1944 memoir:

Symptoms of a new and dangerous spirit among the Socialist youth began to become manifest on all sides. The youngsters appeared at meetings of the party in blue shirts and red ties. At first this attracted no special attention, for oddity in dress is no novelty among radicals. But gradually their number increased and we now could see that this was a uniform. The Socialist youth of America, like the fascist youth in Europe, had succumbed to the shirt mania.

The shirt tendency was followed by the salute mania. In Europe, the Nazi salute was the outstretched arm; here in America the United Front was symbolized by the adoption of the Communist clenched fist salute. This greeting, a raised arm at a slightly different angle from the Nazi or Communist salute, now became routine at all our meetings. [...] Some of the older members of the party were truly horrified at this totalitarian tendency, but others couldn't resist the trend and fell into line. Among these, I painfully record, was Norman Thomas.

Along with the blue shirts, the red ties, the clenched fists, the raised arm salute, came the banners, the slogans, the demonstrations; all the trappings that make for totalitarian, unthinking mass fervor. These now became regular features at party gatherings. I can still recall the howl of triumph that rose from these young people at one of our meetings when for the first time Norman Thomas returned the clenched fist salute to them. As I stood at his side, my arms deliberately folded to indicate that I would have no part of this, their cheers for Thomas rose to almost uncontrollable frenzy.

After its loss on the floor of the Detroit Convention, the Old Guard took its case to the rank and file of the party, who had been called upon to either approve or defeat the new Declaration of Principles in a referendum. A Committee for the Preservation of the Socialist Party was established and an agitational pamphlet published. New York State Assemblyman Charles Solomon was the author of the group's first polemical piece, Detroit and the Party, urging defeat of the 1934 Declaration of Principles by the membership at referendum. In this pamphlet, he decried the Detroit Declaration of Principles as "reckless", observing pointedly that "furious phrases cannot take the place of organized mass power". Solomon noted that over "the past three or four years" there had arisen "certain definite groups" in the ranks of the Socialist Party. He continued:

The Declaration does not stand by itself, in a vacuum, as it were. Important as it is, it does not alone account for the vital struggle that is now being waged in the party. It represents the culminating point of a deep-seated antagonism. It is like the straw that breaks or threatens to break the camel's back. The Declaration of Principles has brought to the surface divergences which are deep, antagonisms which make of our party not a coherent political organization working harmoniously for a common objective but a battle ground of internecine strife.

Haim Kantorovitch, chief theoretician of the Militant faction

Solomon charged that the "so-called 'left'" was "making its position clear" with the Declaration of Principles. "There was no mistaking the flag it had unfurled", he declared; "[i]t was the banner of thinly veiled communism". While he declared that "the Declaration of Principles must be decisively rejected in the referendum", he nevertheless strongly hinted that a factional split was in the offing. Merely defeating the proposed Declaration of Principles was "not enough"; he concluded that the "Socialist Party must be made safe for Socialism, for social democracy".

American Socialist Quarterly editor Haim Kantorovitch made the case for the Militant faction in a pamphlet urging approval of the Declaration of Principles at referendum:

The declaration of principles does not call for insurrection or violence. It simply states that if capitalism should collapse, the Socialist Party will not shrink from the responsibility of taking power. In case of a collapse of capitalism, if the socialists refuse to take power, the fascists will. To say beforehand that in time of a general collapse of capitalism...the socialists will not dare take power before they have a clear mandate from the majority through a democratic vote, is the same as saying that in case of a general collapse of capitalism the Socialist Party will voluntarily, in the name of democracy, turn over the power to the fascists or other reactionary elements, and continue their democratic propaganda from concentration camps.

The membership of the Socialist Party approved the 1934 Declaration of Principles in its referendum, a victory that moved the Old Guard toward the exits—although factional fighting continued into 1936. In 1936, the leaders of the Old Guard formed a new rival organization to the Socialist Party, the Social Democratic Federation, and somewhat reluctantly endorsed Franklin D. Roosevelt for president in that year's election. They also worked to establish the American Labor Party (ALP), a labor-oriented umbrella organization that included both socialist and non-socialist elements, both putting forward its own candidates and endorsing those of the Democratic and Republican parties.

=== End Poverty in California movement ===
The novelist Upton Sinclair had long been associated with the Socialist Party in California. He was twice its candidate for Congress and its nominee for governor in 1926 and 1930, but won barely 50,000 votes out of a million cast. In 1934, Sinclair ran in the Democratic primary for governor on a platform of radical semi-socialist economic reforms he dubbed End Poverty in California (EPIC). In a major upset, he defeated former CPI chairman George Creel (backed by the powerful McAdoo machine) in a landslide, leading Republicans and conservative elements to rally against him. He won 879,537 votes, doubling his primary total, but that was only 38% of the record-breaking turnout, as Republican Frank Merriam won with 49%, while Raymond L. Haight, running under the Progressive Party banner, collected 13%. State Socialist Party chair Milen Dempster mounted a feeble effort to hold back the enthusiasm for Sinclair, gaining less than 3,000 votes.

Before and after Sinclair's primary victory, the Socialist Party in California suffered numerous defections, even from high-profile members like former Berkeley mayor J. Stitt Wilson and incumbent National Executive Committeeman John C. Packard. Those who remained but supported Sinclair were expelled, as the SPA refused to allow its members to be active in any other party. The defections and expulsions destroyed the Socialist Party in California. More importantly, Sinclair's campaign encouraged many radicals in other states to turn away from the Socialist Party. Membership, which had climbed back above 19,000 in 1934, declined to less than 6,000 in 1937 and barely 2,000 in 1940.

=== Demise of the all-inclusive party ===
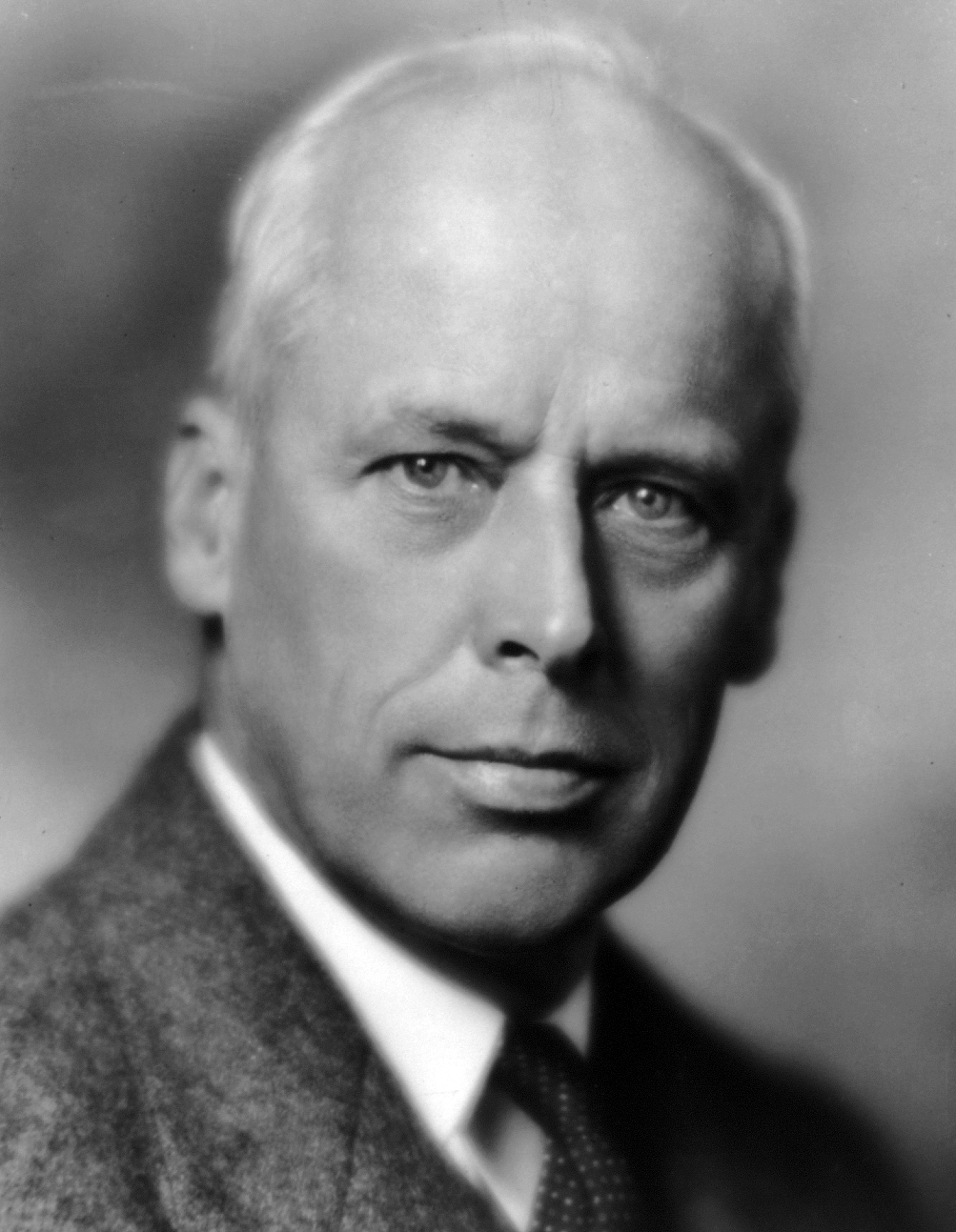
Norman Thomas, six-time presidential candidate of the Socialist Party of America

Norman Thomas, his radical pacifist co-thinkers, and their young Marxist allies of the Militant faction sought to build a mass political movement by transforming the Socialist Party into what they called an "all-inclusive party". Not only was an appeal made to the radical intellectuals and trade unionists who were the historic core of the organization, but an effort was made to work closely with the Communist Party in joint actions and to infuse the Socialist Party with the leading personnel of small radical oppositional organizations, including in particular the anti-Stalinist communist groupings headed by Jay Lovestone (the so-called "Lovestoneites") and James P. Cannon (the so-called "Trotskyists"). An array of left-wing intellectuals came into the Socialist orbit as a result of this venture, including (from the Lovestoneites) Bertram D. Wolfe, Herbert Zam and Benjamin Gitlow, as well as (from the Trotskyists) Max Shachtman, James Burnham, Martin Abern and Hal Draper. A broad array of radicals from other tendencies also contributed to the pages of the party's official theoretical journal, including from the Communist Party orbit Joseph P. Lash of the American Student Union, the radical novelist James T. Farrell, public intellectual Sidney Hook, leading American Marxist of the 1910s Louis B. Boudin and Canadian Trotskyist Maurice Spector.

A bid was made to unite the factional and marginalized American Left in a common cause, and great hope was held for success in the enterprise. After the Nazis rose in Germany and Austria by 1934, no longer did the Communist Party engage in its Third Period epithets against the Socialists as so-called "social fascists". Lillian Symes wrote in the Socialist Party's theoretical magazine in February 1937 of the "incredible change" taking place in the Communist Party in its seeming abandonment of sectarianism and move toward a broad "people's front" against fascism. At the same time, other radical organizations sought to alter their tactics so as to rapidly build an aggressive left-wing organization to oppose nascent fascism. Since 1934, the French Trotskyist organization had entered the French Socialist Party in an effort to build its strength and win support for its ideas. Pressure to follow this policy of the "French Turn" was building among the American Trotskyist group. For a brief period in 1935 and 1936, the vision of the Socialist Party as an "all-inclusive party" that aggregated radical oppositionists and possibly even worked with the Communist Party in common cause seemed achievable.

In January 1936, just as the National Executive Committee of the Socialist Party was expelling the Old Guard, a factional battle was being won in the Trotskyist Workers Party of the United States to join the Socialist Party when a national branch referendum voted unanimously for entry. Negotiations began between the Workers Party and Socialist leaderships, with the decision ultimately made to allow admissions only on the basis of individual applications for membership, rather than en masse admission of the entire group. On June 6, 1936, the Workers Party's weekly newspaper, The New Militant, published its last issue and announced "Workers Party Calls All Revolutionary Workers to Join Socialist Party". About half of the Workers Party heeded the call and entered the Socialist Party.

Although party leader Jim Cannon later hinted that the Trotskyists' entry into the Socialist Party had been a contrived tactic aimed at stealing "confused young Left Socialists" for his own organization, it seems that at its inception, the entryist tactic was made in good faith. Historian Constance Myers notes that "initial prognoses for the union of Trotskyists and Socialists were favorable" and it was only later that "constant and protracted contact caused differences to surface". The Trotskyists retained a common orientation with the radicalized Socialist Party in their opposition to the European war, their preference for industrial unionism and the Congress of Industrial Organizations over the trade unionism of the American Federation of Labor, a commitment to trade union activism, the defense of the Soviet Union as the first workers' state while at the same time maintaining an antipathy toward Stalin's regime and in their general aims in the 1936 election.

Norman Thomas attracted nearly 188,000 votes in his 1936 Socialist Party run for President, but performed poorly in historic strongholds of the party. Moreover, the party's membership had begun to decline. The organization was deeply factionalized, with the Militant faction split into right ("Altmanite"), center ("Clarity"), and left ("Appeal") factions, in addition to the radical pacifists led by Thomas and the midwestern "constructive" socialists led by Dan Hoan. A special convention was planned for the last week of March 1937 to set the party's future policy, initially intended as an unprecedented "secret" gathering.

=== Split with the Trotskyists ===
Before the March convention, the Trotskyist Socialist Appeal faction held an organizational gathering of their own, meeting in Chicago, with 93 delegates gathering on February 20–22, 1937. The meeting organized the faction on a permanent basis, electing a National Action Committee of five to "coordinate branch work" and "formulate Appeal policies". Two delegates from the Clarity caucus were in attendance. James Burnham vigorously attacked the Labour and Socialist International, the international organization of left-wing parties to which the Socialist Party belonged, and tension rose along these lines among the Trotskyists. United action between the Clarity and Appeal groups was not forthcoming and an emergency meeting of Vincent R. Dunne and Cannon was held in New York with leaders of the various factions, including Thomas, Jack Altman, and Gus Tyler of Clarity. At this meeting Thomas pledged that the upcoming convention would make no effort to terminate the various factions' newspapers.

No action was taken at the 1937 convention to expel the Trotskyist "Appeal faction", but pressure continued to build along these lines, fueled by the Communist Party's increasingly hysterical denunciations of Trotsky and his followers as wreckers and agents of international fascism. The convention passed a ban on future branch resolutions on controversial matters, an effort to rein in the factions' activities at the local level. It also banned factional newspapers, a move directly targeting The Socialist Appeal, and formally established The Socialist Call as the party's national organ.

Constance Myers indicates that three factors led to the expulsion of the Trotskyists from the Socialist Party in 1937: the divergence between the official Socialists and the Trotskyist faction on the issues, the determination of Altman's wing of the Militants to oust the Trotskyists, and Trotsky's own decision to move toward a break with the party. Recognizing that the Clarity faction had chosen to stand with the Altmanites and the Thomas group, Trotsky recommended that the Appeal group focus on disagreements over Spain to provoke a split. At the same time, Thomas, freshly returned from Spain, had concluded that the Trotskyists had joined the Socialist Party not to make it stronger, but to capture it for their own purposes. On June 24–25, 1937, a meeting of the Appeal faction's National Action Committee voted to ratchet up the rhetoric against American Labor Party and Republican nominee for mayor of New York Fiorello LaGuardia, a favorite son of many in Socialist ranks, and to reestablish its newspaper, The Socialist Appeal. This was met with expulsions from the party beginning August 9 with a rump meeting of the Central Committee of Local New York, which expelled 52 New York Trotskyists by a vote of 48 to 2, with 18 abstentions, and ordered 70 more to be brought up on charges. Wholesale expulsions followed, with a major section of the Young People's Socialist League leaving the party with the Trotskyists.

Secretary of Local New York Jack Altman declared that the Trotskyists "were expelled for attempting to undermine the Socialist Party, for loyalty and allegiance to an opponent organization, the Bureau of the Fourth International, and for refusing to abide by the decisions and discipline of the National convention, the National Executive Committee, and the City Central Committee of the party, and for no other reason". Editor Gus Tyler of The Socialist Call echoed Altman's sentiments, emphasizing that "the Trotskyites have, during the last week, [...] abandoned the usual means of inner party controversy—debate and appeals through party channels—and, like the Old Guard, have carried their argument into the public, into the capitalist press". The Socialist Call's editor saw the Trotskyist faction's issuance of a statement to The New York Times and the relaunch of its newspaper, The Socialist Appeal, as particularly galling.

=== Collapse of the united front ===
The youth and militance of the Great Depression-era is reflected in the cover of this 1935 song book published by the Socialist Party of America-affiliated Rand School Press.

Things turned out no better for the official Communist Party, devoted as it was to Stalin's regime. The February–March 1937 joint plenum of the Central Committee and Central Control Commission of the All-Union Communist Party in Moscow, which green-lighted a massive avalanche of secret police terror known to history as the Great Purge, changed everything. Baby steps toward multi-candidate elections and the rule of law in the Soviet Union crumbled instantly as show trials, spy mania, mass arrests and mass executions swept the land. The Trotskyist movement in the Soviet Union was particularly targeted, accused of plotting murder of Soviet officials and conducting sabotage and espionage in preparation for a fascist invasion—seemingly insane charges that the Soviet elite genuinely believed. Blood flowed like water as alleged Trotskyists and other politically suspect individuals were rounded up, "investigated", and disposed of with a pistol shot in the base of the skull or a 10-year sentence in the gulag. Around the world, Stalin's and Trotsky's adherents raged against each other.

In Spain, the country in which the Lovestoneites invested most of their emotional energy as fervid supporters of the Workers' Party of Marxist Unification (POUM), 1937 marked a similar bloodbath, with the Communist Party of Spain achieving hegemony among the Republican forces and conducting bloody purges of their own at the Soviet secret police's behest. Joint action between Communist oppositionists and the loyalists to Moscow was henceforth impossible.

In 1937, Norman Thomas willingly acceded to a request from the League for Industrial Democracy (LID) to write a pamphlet on "Democracy versus Dictatorship". Thomas pulled no punches about the Soviet regime:

There are still in both the eastern and western hemispheres many examples of rather crude and primitive military dictatorships. [...] They preach a nationalism whose benefits, spiritual or material, to some degree are for all the people. They profess a positive and paternal concern for the masses. If they rule them sternly that is for their own good. [...]

In the USSR the dictatorship has been the dictatorship of the Communist Party, but all of its professions and all of its performance has been in the name of the entire working class, and the Communist Party still gives lip-service to a final withering away of all dictatorship, even the dictatorship of the proletariat.

Thomas further noted the Communist Party monopoly on the press, radio, schools, army and government and recalled his own recent visit to Moscow, writing:

The old keenness of political discussion in the party has almost died, at least in so far as policy is concerned. (Criticism of administration is still allowed.) A quotation from Stalin is a final answer to all argument. He receives the same sort of exaggerated veneration in public appearances, in the display of his picture, and in written references to him that is accorded to a Mussolini or a Hitler.

Any thought of common-cause with the Communists was now dismissed by Thomas, who indicated that the Communists' fairly recent change of line from fighting the existing trade unions and damning of all political opponents as "social fascists" to attempting to build a "popular front" was merely tactical, related to the perceived needs of Soviet foreign policy to build coalitions with capitalist countries to forestall fascist invasion.

The factional havoc of the move to the "all-inclusive party" paralyzed activity while the Old Guard's new group, the Social Democratic Federation, controlled the bulk of the Socialist Party's former property and the allegiance of those best able to fund the organization. The expulsions of the Trotskyists and disintegration of the party's youth section left the organization greatly weakened, its membership at a new low.

=== Opposition to the New Deal and discrimination in the armed services ===
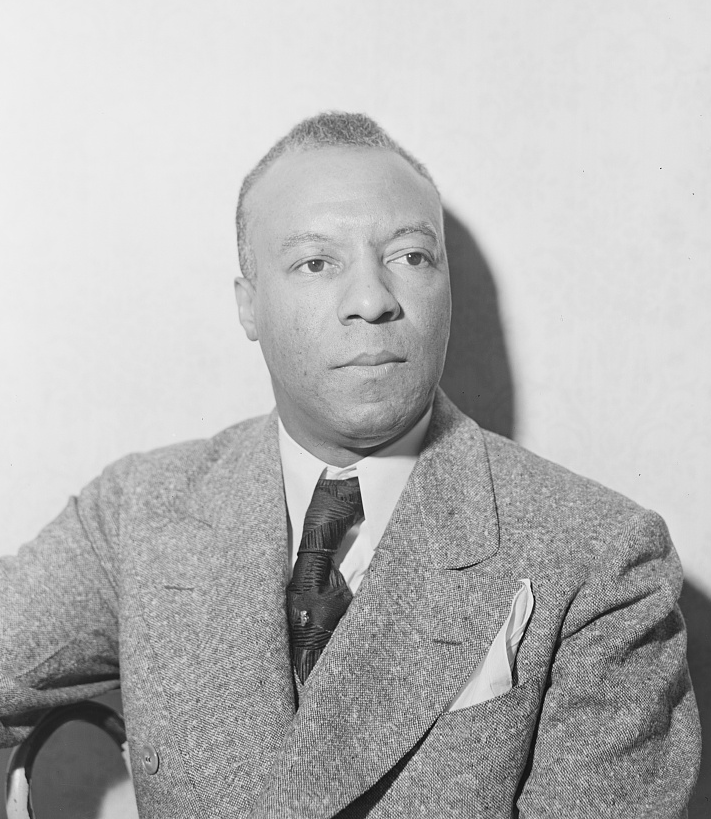
Labor union and civil rights leader A. Philip Randolph in 1942

By 1940, only a small committed core remained in the Socialist Party, including some militant pacifists. The Socialist Party continued to oppose Roosevelt's New Deal as a capitalist palliative, arguing for fundamental change through socialist ownership. In 1940, Thomas was the only presidential candidate who did not support rearmament of Great Britain and China. He also served as an active spokesman for the isolationist America First Committee during 1941.

After the Japanese bombing of Pearl Harbor in December 1941 and the declaration of war, the United States' self-defense and war against fascism was supported by most of the remaining militants and all of the Old Guard. But the Socialist Party adopted a compromise position that did not openly oppose US participation in the war. Its failure to support the war created a rift with many leaders, like the Reuther Brothers of the United Auto Workers. The party's pacifist wing did not advocate any systematic antiwar activities, such as the general strike endorsed by the 1934 Declaration of Principles.

Socialist A. Philip Randolph emerged as one of the most visible spokesmen for African American civil rights. In 1941, Randolph, Bayard Rustin, and A. J. Muste proposed a march on Washington to protest racial discrimination in war industries and propose the desegregation of the US armed forces. The march was canceled after Roosevelt issued Executive Order 8802, the Fair Employment Act. The order banned discrimination in only the war industries, not the armed forces, but the Fair Employment Act is generally perceived as a success for African American labor rights.

In 1942, an estimated 18,000 blacks gathered at Madison Square Garden to hear Randolph kick off a campaign against discrimination in the military, war industries, government agencies and labor unions. Following the act, during the Philadelphia transit strike of 1944 the government backed African American workers' striking to gain positions formerly limited to white employees.

In 1947, Randolph and colleague Grant Reynolds renewed efforts to end discrimination in the armed services, forming the Committee Against Jim Crow in Military Service, later renamed the League for Non-Violent Civil Disobedience. On July 26, 1948, President Harry S. Truman abolished racial segregation in the armed forces through Executive Order 9981. Thomas last ran for president in 1948, after which he became a critical supporter of the postwar liberal consensus. The party retained some pockets of local success in cities such as Milwaukee, Bridgeport, Connecticut, and Reading, Pennsylvania. In New York City, it often ran candidates on the Liberal Party line.

=== Reunification ===
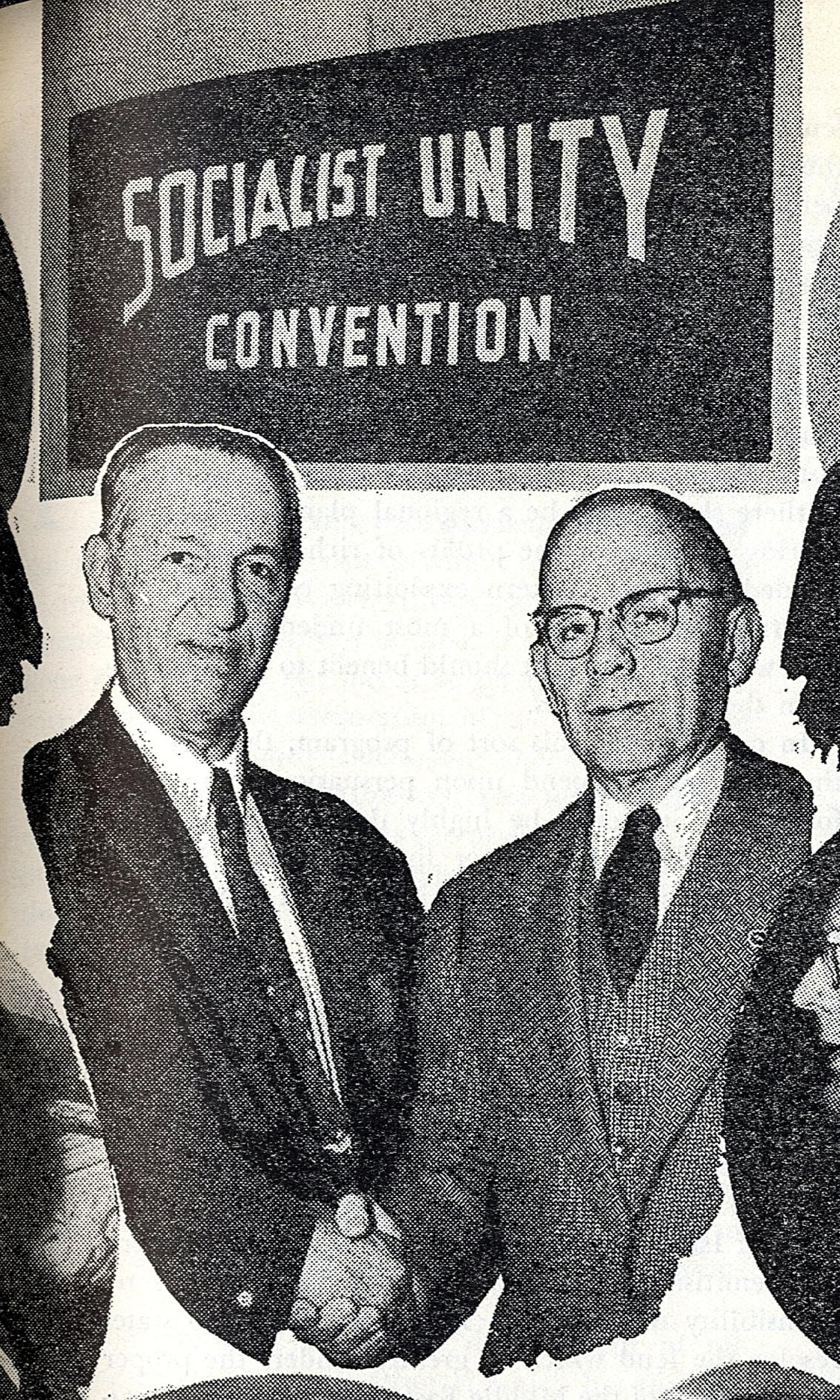
Louis P. Goldberg (left) and Darlington Hoopes shake hands at the 1957 SP-SDF Unity Convention

Reunification with the Social Democratic Federation (SDF) was long a goal of Thomas and his remaining associates in the Socialist Party. As early as 1938, Thomas had acknowledged that several issues had been involved in the split that led to the formation of the SDF, including "organizational policy; the effort to make the party inclusive of all socialist elements not bound by communist discipline; a feeling of dissatisfaction with social democratic tactics which had failed in Germany"; "the socialist estimate of Russia; and the possibility of cooperation with communists on certain specific matters". Still, he held that "those of us who believe that an inclusive socialist party is desirable, and ought to be possible, hope that the growing friendliness of socialist groups will bring about not only joint action but ultimately a satisfactory reunion on the basis of sufficient agreement for harmonious support of a socialist program".

The Socialist Party and the SDF merged to form the Socialist Party-Social Democratic Federation (SP-SDF) in 1957. A small group of holdouts refused to reunify, establishing a new organization called the Democratic Socialist Federation. When the Soviet Union invaded Hungary in 1956, half the members of Communist parties around the world quit—including in the US, where many joined the Socialist Party.

=== Realignment, civil rights movement and the war on poverty ===
In 1958, the party admitted to its ranks the members of the recently dissolved Independent Socialist League, which had been led by Max Shachtman. Shachtman had developed a Marxist critique of Soviet Communism as "bureaucratic collectivism", a new form of class society more oppressive than any form of capitalism. Shachtman's theory was similar to that of many dissidents and refugees from communism, such as the theory of the "new class" proposed by Yugoslavian dissident Milovan Đilas (Djilas). Shachtman was an extraordinary public speaker and a formidable debater, and his intelligent analysis attracted young socialists like Irving Howe and Michael Harrington. Shachtman's denunciations of the Soviet invasion of Hungary attracted younger activists like Tom Kahn and Rachelle Horowitz.

Shachtman's youthful followers brought new vigor into the party, and he encouraged them to take positions of responsibility and leadership. As a young leader, Harrington sent Kahn and Horowitz to help Bayard Rustin with the civil rights movement. Rustin had helped to spread pacificism and non-violence to leaders of the civil rights movement like Martin Luther King Jr., while Kahn and Horowitz quickly became close assistants of Rustin. The civil rights movement benefited from Shachtman's intelligence and analysis and increasingly from Kahn's. Rustin and his young aides, dubbed the Bayard Rustin Marching and Chowder Society by Harrington, organized many protest activities. The young socialists helped Rustin and Randolph organize the 1963 March on Washington, where King delivered his "I Have a Dream" speech.

Harrington soon became the most visible socialist in the United States when his The Other America became a best-seller after The New Yorker ran a long, laudatory review by Dwight Macdonald. Harrington and other socialists were called to Washington, D.C., to assist the Kennedy administration and then the Johnson administration's war on poverty and Great Society.

The young socialists' role in the civil rights movement made the Socialist Party more attractive. Harrington, Kahn, and Horowitz were officers and staff of the League for Industrial Democracy (LID), which helped start the New Left Students for a Democratic Society (SDS). The three LID officers clashed with the SDS's less experienced activists, as when Tom Hayden's Port Huron Statement criticized socialist and liberal opposition to communism and criticized the labor movement while promoting students as agents of social change. LID and SDS split in 1965, when SDS voted to remove from its constitution the "exclusion clause" that prohibited membership by communists. The SDS exclusion clause had barred "advocates of or apologists for totalitarianism". The clause's removal effectively invited "disciplined cadre" to attempt to "take over or paralyze" SDS as had occurred to mass organizations in the thirties.

The experience of the civil rights movement and the coalition of labor unions and other progressive forces suggested that the United States was changing and that a mass movement of the democratic left was possible. In terms of electoral politics, Shachtman, Harrington, and Kahn argued that it was a waste of effort to run Socialist Party candidates in elections against Democratic Party candidates. They instead advocated a political strategy called "realignment" that prioritized strengthening labor unions and other progressive organizations that were already active in the Democratic Party. Contributing to the day-to-day struggles of the civil rights movement and labor unions had gained socialists credibility and influence and had helped to push politicians in the Democratic Party toward social-democratic positions on civil rights and the war on poverty.

=== From the Socialist Party to Social Democrats, USA ===
The Socialist Party's 1972 convention had two co-chairmen, Bayard Rustin and Charles S. Zimmerman of the International Ladies' Garment Workers' Union (ILGWU); and a First National Vice Chairman, James S. Glaser, who were reelected by acclamation. In his opening speech to the convention, Rustin called for the group to organize against the "reactionary policies of the Nixon Administration" and criticized the "irresponsibility and élitism of the 'New Politics' liberals".

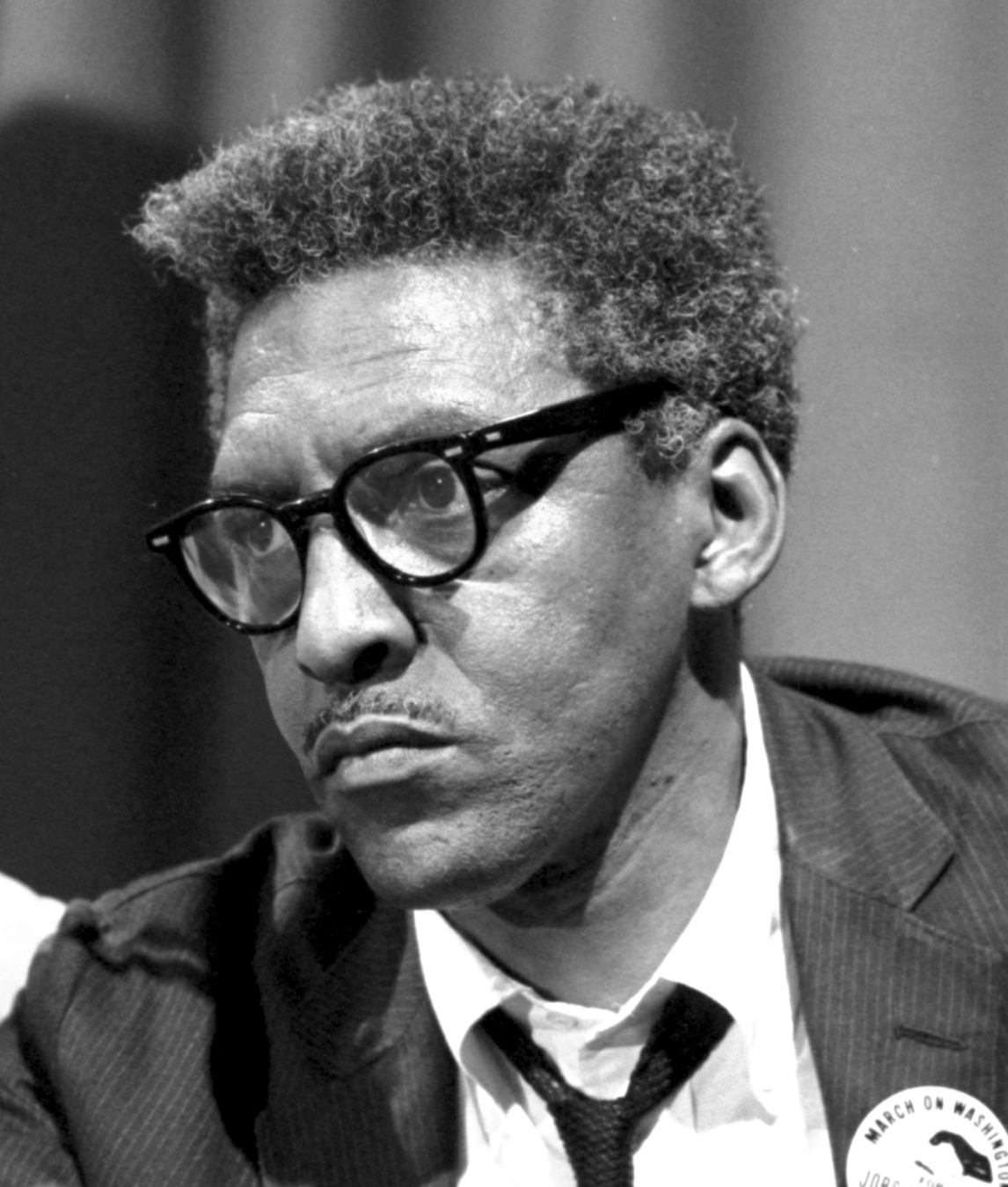
Bayard Rustin, an important member of the Socialist Party of America throughout the decade of the 1960s, was elected a National Co-Chairman late in the decade.

The party voted to change its name to Social Democrats, USA (SDUSA). Renaming the party SDUSA was meant to be "realistic". The New York Times observed that the Socialist Party had last sponsored a candidate for president in 1956, Darlington Hoopes, who received only 2,121 votes cast in only six states. Because the party no longer sponsored candidates in presidential elections, the name "Party" had been "misleading" as "Party" had hindered the recruiting of activists who participated in the Democratic Party, according to the majority report. The name "Socialist" was replaced by "Social Democrats" because many Americans associated the word "socialism" with Soviet Communism. The party also wished to distinguish itself from two small Marxist parties, the Socialist Workers Party and the Socialist Labor Party.

The Unity Caucus had a supermajority of votes and its position carried on every issue by a ratio of two to one. The convention elected a national committee of 33 members, with 22 seats for the majority caucus, eight seats for Harrington's "Coalition Caucus", two for the "Debs Caucus" and one for the independent Samuel H. Friedman. Friedman and the minority caucuses had opposed the name change.

The convention voted on and adopted proposals for its program by a two-one vote. On foreign policy, the program called for "firmness toward Communist aggression", but on the Vietnam War the program opposed "any efforts to bomb Hanoi into submission" and instead endorsed negotiating a peace agreement, which should protect Communist political cadres in South Vietnam from further military or police reprisals. Harrington's proposal for an immediate withdrawal of American forces was defeated. Harrington complained that after its March 1972 convention the Socialist Party had endorsed George McGovern with a statement loaded with "constructive criticism". He also complained that the party had not mobilized enough support for McGovern. The majority caucus's Arch Puddington replied that the California branch had been especially active in supporting McGovern while the New York branch had instead focused on a congressional race.

=== Democratic Socialist Organizing Committee and Union for Democratic Socialism ===
Late in October 1972, before the Socialist Party's December Convention, Harrington resigned as National Co-Chairman of the Socialist Party. Although little remarked upon at the time despite Harrington's status as "possibly the most widely known of the Socialist leaders since the death of Norman Thomas", it soon became clear that this was the precursor of a decisive split in the organization.

Harrington had written extensively about the progressive potential of the so-called "New Politics" in the Democratic Party and had come to advocate unilateral withdrawal from the Vietnam War and positions more conservative party members saw as "avant-garde" on the questions of abortion and gay rights. This put him and his co-thinkers at odds with the party's younger generation of leaders, who espoused a strongly labor-oriented direction for the party and who were broadly supportive of AFL–CIO leader George Meany.

In the early spring of 1973, Harrington resigned from the SDUSA. The same year, he and his supporters formed the Democratic Socialist Organizing Committee (DSOC). At its start, DSOC had 840 members, of whom 2% served on its national board, while approximately 200 had been members of SDUSA or its predecessors whose membership was then 1,800, according to a 1973 profile of Harrington. Its high-profile members included Congressman Ron Dellums and William Winpisinger, President of the International Association of Machinists. In 1982, DSOC established the Democratic Socialists of America (DSA) upon merging with the New American Movement, an organization of democratic socialists mostly from the New Left.

The Union for Democratic Socialism was another organization formed by former members of the Socialist Party. David McReynolds, who had resigned from the Socialist Party between 1970 and 1971, along with many from the Debs Caucus, were the core members. In 1973, the UDS declared itself the Socialist Party USA.

== National Conventions ==
Convention	Location	Date	Notes and references
Socialist Unity Convention	Indianapolis	July 29 – August 1, 1901	Unites Debs-Berger's "Chicago" and Hillquit's (ex SLP) "Springfield" groups calling themselves Social Democratic Party to create a united Socialist Party of America. News summary of proceedings.
1904 National Convention	Chicago	May 1–6, 1904	Sometimes called "1st Convention". Establishes a seven-member National Executive Committee and nominates Debs for the second time. Stenographic Proceedings Part 1 and Part 2.
1908 National Convention	Chicago	May 10–17, 1908	Nominates Debs for the third time. Stenographic Proceedings Part 1 and Part 2.
1st National Congress	Chicago	May 15–21, 1910	Policy-making session called Congress because no presidential candidate nominated. Stenographic Proceedings Part 1 and Part 2.
1912 National Convention	Indianapolis	May 12–18, 1912	Passes constitutional amendment requiring support of electoral politics and banning advocacy of sabotage. Again causes NEC and Executive Secretary to be chosen by National Committee, not party referendum. Nominates Debs for the fourth time. Stenographic Proceedings Part 1 and Part 2.
1917 Emergency National Convention	St. Louis	April 7–14, 1917	Met to decide party attitude to war in Europe. Adopts militant anti-war platform. Stenographic Proceedings.
1919 Emergency National Convention	Chicago	August 30 – September 5, 1919	Formally meeting about party policy after war. Factional war shatters party into three groups—regular SPA, Communist Labor Party of America and Communist Party USA.
1920 National Convention	New York City	May 8–14, 1920	Changes constitution to require small annual conventions. Nominates imprisoned Debs for President for the fifth and final time.
9th National Convention	Detroit	June 25–29, 1921	First numbered convention. Minutes and resolutions in Socialist World, vol. 2, no. 6/7, June-July 1921.
10th National Convention	Cleveland	April 29 – May 2, 1922	Joins Vienna International. News account in New Age, May 4, 1922.
11th National Convention	New York City	May 19–22, 1923	Minutes, resolutions, correspondence and the NEC report in Socialist World, vol. 4, no. 6, June 1923.
12th National Convention	Cleveland	July 6–8, 1924	Endorses pro-labor Progressive Robert M. La Follette. Minutes in Socialist World, vol. 5, no. 7, July 1924 and resolutions in Socialist World, vol. 5, no. 8, August 1924.
13th National Convention	Chicago	February 23–25, 1925	
14th National Convention	Pittsburgh	May 1–3, 1926	Constitution changed to require bi-annual Conventions.
16th National Convention	New York City	April 13–17, 1928	Nominates Norman Thomas for the first time. Stenogram published. Proceedings.
17th National Convention	Milwaukee	May 20–24, 1932	Challenge to Hillquit as National Chairman turned back. Nominates Thomas for the second time. Proceedings.
18th National Convention	Detroit	June 1–3, 1934	Passes "Declaration of Principles" calling for direct action against war and armed struggle in event of fascist takeover of the United States. Militant vs. Old Guard factional feud escalates.
19th National Convention	Cleveland	May 23–26, 1936	Solidifies Militant faction's hold of party apparatus. Suspension of dissident right-wing in New York ratified. Old Guard exits. Nominates Thomas for the third time.
Special National Convention	Chicago	March 26–29, 1937	Called to address "organizational questions" (i.e. finances, re-registration of members).
21st National Convention	Kenosha, Wisconsin	April 21–23, 1938	First Convention after expulsion and departure of the Trotskyist Socialist Appeal faction.
1940 National Convention	Washington, D.C.	April 4–6, 1940	Nominates Thomas for the fourth time.
1942 National Convention	Milwaukee	May 30 – June 1, 1942	
1944 National Convention	Reading, Pennsylvania	June 2–4, 1944	Nominates Thomas for the fifth time.
1946 National Convention	Chicago	May 31 – June 2, 1946	
1948 National Convention	Reading, Pennsylvania	May 7–9, 1948	Nominates Thomas for the sixth and final time. Speeches and documents in WorldCat listing.
27th National Convention	Detroit	May–June 1950	Reports published. Resolutions available in Socialist Call, vol. 17, no. 11, June 9, 1950.
28th National Convention	Cleveland	May 30 – June 1, 1952	WorldCat listing.
29th National Convention	Philadelphia	May 29–31, 1954	WorldCat listing.
30th National Convention	Chicago	June 8–10, 1956	WorldCat listing.
Unity Convention	New York City	January 18–19, 1957	Reunification of SP with the "Old Guard" Social Democratic Federation to form the Socialist Party of America-Social Democratic Federation (SP-SDF). Socialist Call, vol. 25, no. 1–2, January–February 1957.
"2nd National Convention"	New York City	May 30 – June 1, 1958	WorldCat listing.
1960 National Convention	Washington, D.C.	May 28–30, 1960	voted not to field a campaign in the 1960 presidential election; Proceedings
1962 National Convention	Washington, D.C.	June 8–10, 1962	Proceedings.
1964 National Convention	Chicago	May 29–31, 1964	Proceedings.
1966 National Convention	New York City	June 10–12, 1966	Elects George Woywod Administrative Secretary. Proceedings.
1968 National Convention	Chicago	July 3–7, 1968	Elects Mike Harrington National Chairman and Penn Kemble National Secretary.
1970 National Convention	New York City	June 19–21, 1970	WorldCat listing.
Special Unity Convention	New York City	March 10–12, 1972	SP Merges with the Democratic Socialist Federation, adopting the name Socialist Party of America–Democratic Socialist Federation (SP–DSF).
1972 National Convention	New York City	December 29–31, 1972	Social Democrats, USA (December 1972) [copyright 1973]. The American challenge: A social-democratic program for the seventies. New York: S.D. U.S.A. and YPSL. "[P]rogram [...] adopted at the Social Democrats, U.S.A. and Young People's Socialist League conventions at the end of December, 1972." "The S.D. USA" is the "successor to the Socialist Party, USA and the Democratic Socialist Federation of the USA".

== Other prominent members ==
This is a brief representative sample of Socialist Party leaders not listed above as presidential or vice presidential candidates. For a more comprehensive list, see the list of members of the Socialist Party of America.

- Victor L. Berger
- Abraham Cahan ¤
- James P. Cannon *
- Eugene V. Debs
- Theodore Debs
- David Dubinsky ¤
- Max Eastman *
- Sandra Feldman
- Benjamin Gitlow *
- Max S. Hayes ¤
- Michael Harrington ¤
- Bill Haywood *
- George D. Herron
- Morris Hillquit
- Daniel Hoan
- Sidney Hook *
- Irving Howe ¤
- Tom Kahn ¤
- Helen Keller
- Penn Kemble ¤
- Charles H. Kerr
- Harry W. Laidler ¤
- Algernon Lee ¤
- Jack London
- Frederic O. MacCartney
- Jasper McLevy ¤
- David McReynolds ¤
- Kate Richards O'Hare
- James Oneal ¤
- Mary White Ovington
- Jacob Panken ¤
- David Petrovsky
- A. Philip Randolph
- John Reed *
- Victor Reuther ¤
- Walter Reuther
- Charles Edward Russell ¤
- Bayard Rustin ¤
- Irwin Suall ¤
- Max Shachtman *
- Upton Sinclair
- Jessie Wallace Hughan *
- John Spargo ¤
- J. G. Phelps Stokes
- Rose Pastor Stokes *
- Baruch Charney Vladeck ¤
- Frank P. Zeidler ¤
- Charles S. Zimmerman *

¤ Went on to start or join another socialist or social democratic organization.
* Went on to start or join the Communist Party, Communist Labor Party or Workers Party of America.

== Newspapers and magazines ==
- American Appeal (Chicago)
- American Socialist (Chicago)
- American Socialist Quarterly (New York)
- Appeal to Reason (Girard, Kansas)
- Chicago Daily Socialist (Chicago)
- The Class Struggle (New York)
- Cleveland Citizen (Cleveland)
- The Comrade (New York)
- The Eye Opener (Chicago)
- Hammer and Tongs (New York and elsewhere)
- International Socialist Review (Chicago)
- The Jewish Daily Forward (New York)
- Labor Action (San Francisco)
- The Liberator (New York)
- The Masses (New York)
- The Messenger (New York)
- Miami Valley Socialist (Dayton, Ohio)
- Milwaukee Leader (Milwaukee)
- The National Rip-Saw (St. Louis)
- Naujienos (Chicago)
- The New Age (Buffalo, New York)
- New America (New York)
- The New Day (Milwaukee)
- The New Leader (New York)
- New Times (Minneapolis)
- The New Review (New York)
- New York Call (New York)
- New Yorker Volkszeitung
- Ohio Socialist (Cleveland)
- Pearson's Magazine (New York)
- Proletarec (Chicago)
- Rabotnik Polski (Chicago)
- Raivaaja (Fitchburg, Massachusetts)
- Reading Labor Advocate (Reading, Pennsylvania)
- The Social Democrat (Chicago)
- The Socialist (Columbus, Ohio)
- The Socialist (Seattle, Toledo, Ohio and Caldwell, Idaho)
- The Socialist Appeal (Chicago and New York)
- The Socialist Call (New York)
- Socialist Party Monthly Bulletin (Chicago)
- St. Louis Labor
- Truth (Duluth, Minnesota)
- Työmies (Hancock, Michigan)
- Der Wecker (New York)
- Wilshire's Magazine (Los Angeles and New York)
- The World (Oakland, California)

=== Official national press ===
Most of the socialist press was privately owned as the party was concerned that a single official publication might lead to censorship in favor of the editors' views, in much the same way Daniel DeLeon used The People to dominate the Socialist Labor Party. A number of papers carried the party's official notices in its first years, the most important being The Worker (New York), The Appeal to Reason (Girard, Kansas), The Socialist (Seattle and Toledo, Ohio), The Worker's Call (Chicago), St. Louis Labor, and The Social Democratic Herald (Milwaukee). The party soon discovered that it needed a more regular means of communication with its members and the 1904 National Convention decided to establish a regular party organ. Over the next seven decades, a series of official publications were issued directly by the SPA, most of which are today available on microfilm in essentially full runs:

- Socialist Party Bulletin (monthly in Chicago) — vol. 1, no. 1 (September 1904), vol. 9, no. 6 (March/April 1913).
- Socialist Party Weekly Bulletin (Chicago). — 1905? to 1909?. Mimeographed. New York Public Library has partial run on microfilm, August 12, 1905 – September 4, 1909.
- The Party Builder (weekly in Chicago) — whole no. 1 (August 28, 1912) – whole no. 88 (July 11, 1914).
- The American Socialist (weekly in Chicago). — vol. 1, no. 1 (July 18, 1914), vol. 4, no. 8 (September 8, 1917).
- The Eye Opener (weekly in Chicago) — previously existing publication, official from vol. ?, no. ? (August 25, 1917) to vol. ?, no. ? (June 1, 1920).
- Socialist Party Bulletin (monthly in Chicago) — vol. 1, no. 1 (February 1917), vol. ?, no. ? (June 1920). It may have suspended publication from July 1917 to May 1919.
- The New Day (weekly in Milwaukee) — vol. 1, no. 1 (June 12, 1920), vol. ?, no. ? (July 22, 1922).
- Socialist World (monthly in Chicago) — vol. 1, no. 1 (July 15, 1920), vol. 6, no. 8 (October 1925).
- American Appeal (weekly in Chicago) — vol. 7, no. 1 (January 1, 1926), vol. 8, no. 48 (November 26, 1927). It was merged into The New Leader.
- Labor and Socialist Press News (Chicago) — August 30, 1929 – February 26, 1932. Mimeographed weekly.
  - Labor and Socialist Press Service (Chicago) — March 4, 1932 – July 17, 1936. Mimeographed weekly.
- American Socialist Quarterly (New York) — vol. 1, no. 1 (January 1932), vol. 4, no. 3 (November 1935).
  - American Socialist Monthly (New York) — vol. 5, no. 1 (March 1936), vol. 6, no. 1 (May 1937).
  - Socialist Review (irregular in New York) — vol. 6, no. 2 (September 1937), vol. 7, no. 2 (Spring 1940).
- Socialist Action (monthly in Chicago) — vol. 1, no. 1 (October 20, 1934), vol. 2, no. 9 (November 1936). Three mimeographed "Socialist Action Pamphlets" also produced, press run of 200.
- The Socialist Call (various in New York and Chicago) — vol. 1, no. 1 (March 23, 1935), vol. ?, no. ? (Spring 1962).
- Hammer and Tongs (irregular in New York and Milwaukee) — no numbers used, January 1940–November 1972.
- Socialist Campaigner (irregular in New York) — vol. 1, no. 1 (early 1940) to vol. 5, no. 3 (December 26, 1944). Mimeographed.
- Organizers' Bulletin (irregular in New York) — no. 1 (middle 1940) to no. 3 (September 1940). Mimeographed.
- Progress Report (monthly in New York) — unnumbered, June 1950 – September 1951. Mimeographed, sent to branch organizers and functionaries.
  - News and Views (monthly in New York) — unnumbered, October 1951–December 1953. Mimeographed, sent to branch organizers and functionaries.
- Socialist Party Bulletin (monthly in New York) — unnumbered, October 1955?–January 1957. Two page typeset newsletter.
  - Socialist Bulletin (monthly in New York) — unnumbered, February 1957–April 1958?. Name change due to merger with the Social Democratic Federation.
- New America (bimonthly in New York) — vol. 1, no. 1 (October 18, 1960), vol. ?, no. ? (1985). Continued as organ of Social Democrats, USA.

== Executive Secretaries ==
- 1901–1903: Leon Greenbaum
- 1903–1905: William Mailly
- 1905–1911: J. Mahlon Barnes
- 1911–1913: John M. Work
- 1913–1916: Walter Lanfersiek
- 1916–1919: Adolph Germer
- 1919–1924: Otto Branstetter
- 1924–1925: Bertha Hale White
- 1925–1926: George Ross Kirkpatrick
- 1926–1929: William H. Henry
- 1929–1936: Clarence Senior
- 1936–1939: Roy Burt
- 1939–1942: Travers Clement
- 1942–1950: Harry Fleischman
- 1950–1954: Robin Myers
- 1954–1957: Herman Singer
- 1957–1962: Irwin Suall
- 1962–1966: Betty Elkin
- 1966–1968: George Woywod
- 1968–1970: Penn Kemble
- 1970–1972: Joan Suall

== Electoral history ==
=== Federal elections ===
==== Presidential elections ====
U.S. Presidency
Year	Nominee	Running-mate	# votes	% votes (Nationally)	% votes (Where Balloted)	Electoral votes	Place	Performance Map (Note: Shades are by degrees of (1%))
1904	Eugene V. Debs	Ben Hanford	402,810	2.98 / 100 (Note: Of 13,525,095 votes)	2.99 / 100 (Note: Of 13,469,977 votes)	0 / 476	3rd	
1908	Eugene V. Debs	Ben Hanford	420,852	2.83 / 100 (Note: Of 14,889,239 votes)	2.84 / 100 (Note: Of 14,836,559 votes)	0 / 483	3rd	
1912	Eugene V. Debs	Emil Seidel	901,551	5.99 / 100 (Note: Of 15,048,834 votes)		0 / 531	4th	
1916	Allan L. Benson	George R. Kirkpatrick	590,524	3.19 / 100 (Note: Of 18,536,585 votes)		0 / 531	3rd	
1920	Eugene V. Debs	Seymour Stedman	914,191	3.41 / 100 (Note: Of 26,788,225 votes)	3.51 / 100 (Note: Of 26,024,474 votes)	0 / 531	3rd	
1924	Robert M. La Follette (Note: La Follette's campaign was endorsed by a number of Leftist parties, among them the Socialist Party.)	Burton K. Wheeler	4,831,706	16.61 / 100 (Note: Of 29,097,107 votes)	16.68 / 100 (Note: Of 28,975,156 votes)	13 / 531	3rd	
1928	Norman Thomas	James H. Maurer	267,478	0.73 / 100 (Note: Of 36,807,012 votes)	0.76 / 100 (Note: Of 35,190,267 votes)	0 / 531	3rd	
1932	Norman Thomas	James H. Maurer	884,885	2.23 / 100 (Note: Of 39,751,898 votes)	2.28 / 100 (Note: Of 38,737,031 votes)	0 / 531	3rd	
1936	Norman Thomas	George A. Nelson	187,910	0.41 / 100 (Note: Of 45,647,699 votes)	0.44 / 100 (Note: Of 43,054,178 votes)	0 / 531	4th	
1940	Norman Thomas	Maynard C. Krueger	116,599	0.23 / 100 (Note: Of 49,902,113 votes)	0.30 / 100 (Note: Of 38,449,423 votes)	0 / 531	3rd	
1944	Norman Thomas	Darlington Hoopes	79,017	0.16 / 100 (Note: Of 47,977,063 votes)	0.21 / 100 (Note: Of 36,949,015 votes)	0 / 531	4th	
1948	Norman Thomas	Tucker P. Smith	139,569	0.29 / 100 (Note: Of 48,793,535 votes)	0.36 / 100 (Note: Of 38,833,079 votes)	0 / 531	5th	
1952	Darlington Hoopes	Samuel H. Friedman	20,203	0.03 / 100 (Note: Of 61,751,942 votes)	0.07 / 100 (Note: Of 29,657,782 votes)	0 / 531	6th	
1956	Darlington Hoopes	Samuel H. Friedman	2,128	0.00 / 100 (Note: Of 62,021,979 votes)	0.01 / 100 (Note: Of 17,093,476 votes)	0 / 531	9th	
1960	No National Campaign (Note: A resolution at the 1960 National Convention was passed (62-28), with (10) absentations, to not put a presidential candidate in the field. Resolutions at subsequent National Conventions to nominate a Presidential candidate were not successful.)							
1964	No National Campaign							
1968	No National Campaign							
1972	No National Campaign							

==== Senatorial Elections ====
U.S. Senator (Direct Elections)
Election	Nominees	Votes			Control				Performance Map (Note: Shades are by degrees of (1.5%))
Election	Nominees	No.	Share	Share (Where Contesting)	No. (Holding Elections)	±	No. (All Seats)	±	Performance Map
1906-1907	2	12,485	13.57 / 100 (Note: Of 91,973 votes)	13.57 / 100 (Note: Of 91,973 votes)	0 / 1	Steady	0 / 90	Steady	
1906-1907	Candidate Performance: OR-2 (ST) ▌J. D. Stevens - 12,485 votes - (15.17%); OR-2 (LT) ▌A. G. Simola - 5,608 votes - (6.10%)				0 / 1	Steady	0 / 90	Steady	
1908-1909	2	7,196	5.30 / 100 (Note: Of 135,748 votes)	5.30 / 100 (Note: Of 135,748 votes)	0 / 2	Steady	0 / 92	Steady	
1908-1909	Candidate Performance: NV-3 ▌T. C. Lutz - 1,939 votes - (8.29%); OR-3 ▌J. Cooper - 5,257 votes - (4.68%)				0 / 2	Steady	0 / 92	Steady	
1910-1911	3	3,193	7.65 / 100 (Note: Of 41,759 votes)	7.65 / 100 (Note: Of 41,759 votes)	0 / 1	Steady	0 / 92	Steady	
1910-1911	Candidate Performance: NV-1 ▌Jud Harris - 1,959 votes - (9.62%); AZ-(Both Seats) ▌E. Johnson - 1,234 votes - (5.77%); (Note: Elections were held pending admission as a State.) ▌E. B. Johnson - 1,221 votes - (5.71%)				0 / 1	Steady	0 / 92	Steady	
1912-1913	4	80,303	5.95 / 100 (Note: Of 1,348,557 votes)	10.65 / 100 (Note: Of 754,106 votes)	0 / 7	Steady	0 / 96	Steady	
1912-1913	Candidate Performance: KS ▌Allan W. Ricker - 25,610 votes - (7.32%); NV-1 ▌G. A. Steele - 2,740 votes - (13.73%); OK ▌John G. Wills - 40,860 votes - (16.30%); OR ▌B. F. Ramp - 11,093 votes - (8.30%)				0 / 7	Steady	0 / 96	Steady	
1914	28	499,985	4.59 / 100 (Note: Of 10,887,878 votes)	4.66 / 100 (Note: Of 10,730,106 votes)	0 / 32	Steady	0 / 96	Steady	
1914	Candidate Performance: AL ▌S. F. Hinton - 1,159 votes - (1.43%); AZ ▌Bert Davis - 3,582 votes - (7.39%); CA ▌Ernest Untermann - 56,805 votes - (6.41%); CO ▌James C. Griffiths - 13,943 votes - (5.51%); CT ▌George Spiess - 5,890 votes - (3.26%); ID ▌Calistus Cooper - 7,888 votes - (7.29%); IL ▌Adolph Germer - 39,889 votes - (3.93%); IN ▌Stephen N. Reynolds - 21,719 votes - (3.36%); IA ▌I. S. McCullis - 8,462 votes - (1.98%); KS ▌Christian B. Hoffman - 24,502 votes - (4.82%); KY ▌H. J. Robertson - 4,890 votes - (1.44%); MD ▌Charles E. Develin - 3,255 votes - (1.51%); MO ▌Thomas E. Greene - 17,061 votes - (2.76%); NV ▌Ashley G. Miller - 5,451 votes - (25.28%); NH ▌William H. Wilkins - 1,089 votes - (1.34%); NY ▌Charles E. Russell - 55,266 votes - (4.07%); NC ▌Henry J. Oliver - 425 votes - (0.20%); ND ▌W. H. Brown - 6,231 votes - (7.14%); OH ▌F. K. Hitchens - 52,803 votes - (4.93%); OK ▌Patrick S. Nagle - 52,259 votes - (20.99%); OR ▌Benjamin F. Ramp - 10,666 votes - (4.34%); PA ▌Fred W. Whiteside - 37,950 votes - (3.41%); SC ▌J. H. Roberts - 89 votes - (0.27%); SD ▌E. P. Johnson - 2,674 votes - (2.69%); UT ▌J. F. Parsons - 5,257 votes - (4.59%); VT ▌James Canfield - 772 votes - (1.23%); WA ▌Adam H. Barth - 30,234 votes - (8.76%); WI ▌Emil Seidel - 29,774 votes - (9.67%)				0 / 32	Steady	0 / 96	Steady	
1916	30	413,083	3.39 / 100 (Note: Of 12,181,155 votes)	3.57 / 100 (Note: Of 11,566,525 votes)	0 / 35	Steady	0 / 96	Steady	
1916	Candidate Performance: AZ ▌W. S. Bradford - 2,827 votes - (5.24%); CA ▌Walter T. Mills - 49,341 votes - (5.25%); CT ▌Martin F. Plunkett - 5,279 votes - (2.48%); DE ▌William C. Ferris - 490 votes - (0.96%); FL ▌R. L. Goodwin - 3,304 votes - (4.69%); IN 3 ▌Edward Henry - 21,626 votes - (3.06%); IN 1 ▌Joseph Zimmerman - 21,558 votes - (3.06%); ME ▌James F. Carey - 1,510 votes - (1.00%); MD ▌Sylvester L. Young - 2,590 votes - (1.12%); MA ▌William N. McDonald - 15,558 votes - (3.01%); MI ▌Edward O. Foss - 15,614 votes - (2.41%); MO ▌Kate Richards O'Hare - 14,654 votes - (1.87%); MT ▌Henry La Beau - 9,292 votes - (5.54%); NE ▌E. E. Olmstead - 7,425 votes - (2.59%); NV ▌Ashley G. Miller - 9,507 votes - (28.91%); NJ ▌William C. Doughty - 13,358 votes - (3.06%); NM ▌W. P. Metcalf - 2,028 votes - (3.04%); NY ▌Joseph D. Cannon - 61,167 votes - (3.96%); ND ▌E. R. Fry - 8,472 votes - (7.90%); OH ▌C. E. Ruthenberg - 38,186 votes - (3.29%); PA ▌Charles W. Ervin - 45,385 votes - (3.76%); RI ▌Frederick W. Hurst - 1,996 votes - (2.25%); TN ▌H. H. Magnum - 2,193 votes - (0.83%); TX ▌Thomas A. Hickey - 18,616 votes - (4.99%); UT ▌Christian Poulson - 4,497 votes - (3.16%); VT ▌Norman E. Greenslet - 1,336 votes - (2.10%); WA ▌Bruce Rogers - 21,709 votes - (5.95%); WV ▌G. A. Gneiser - 4,881 votes - (1.70%); WI ▌Richard Elsner - 28,908 votes - (6.85%); WY ▌Richard Elsner - 1,334 votes - (2.61%)				0 / 35	Steady	0 / 96	Steady	
1918	13	88,753	1.41 / 100 (Note: Of 6,272,837 votes)	2.84 / 100 (Note: Of 3,125,219 votes)	0 / 38	Steady	0 / 96	Steady	
1918	Candidate Performance: DE ▌William H. Connor - 420 votes - (1.00%); IL ▌William B. Lloyd - 37,167 votes - (3.91%); KS ▌Eva Harding - 11,429 votes - (2.58%); MI ▌Edward O. Foss - 4,763 votes - (1.09%); MS ▌S.W. Rose - 1,569 votes - (4.96%); NJ ▌James M. Reilly - 14,723 votes - (4.14%); NM ▌W. P. Metcalf - 531 votes - (1.12%); OK ▌C.M. Greenland - 7,259 votes - (3.83%); OR ▌Albert Slaughter - 5,373 votes - (3.53%); RI ▌Frederick W. Hurst - 1,623 votes - (2.00%); TX ▌M.A. Smith - 1,608 votes - (0.90%); WV ▌M.S. Holt - 2,288 votes - (1.06%)				0 / 38	Steady	0 / 96	Steady	
1920	17	563,710	2.87 / 100 (Note: Of 19,630,545 votes)	4.19 / 100 (Note: Of 13,446,554 votes)	0 / 34	Steady	0 / 96	Steady	
1920	Candidate Performance: AL-3 ▌A. M. Forsman - 1,984 votes - (0.85%); AL-2 ▌W. H. Chichester - 2,820 votes - (1.22%); CA ▌Elvina S. Beals - 36,545 votes - (4.00%); CT ▌Martin F. Plunkett - 10,118 votes - (2.77%); FL ▌M. J. Martin - 3,525 votes - (2.48%); IL ▌Gustave T. Fraenckel - 66,463 votes - (3.22%); IN ▌Francis M. Wampler - 23,395 votes - (1.87%); KS ▌Dan Beedy - 13,417 votes - (2.63%); MD ▌William A. Toole - 6,559 votes - (1.68%); MO ▌Elias F. Hodges - 20,002 votes - (1.51%); NV ▌James Jepson - 494 votes - (1.80%); NH ▌William H. Wilkins - 1,004 votes - (0.64%); NY ▌Jacob Panken - 208,155 votes - (7.60%); OK ▌A. A. Bagwell - 23,664 votes - (4.84%); OR ▌Albert Slaughter - 6,949 votes - (3.02%); PA ▌Birch Wilson - 67,316 votes - (3.78%); UT ▌J. Alex Beven - 7,112 votes - (4.87%); WI ▌Frank J. Weber - 66,172 votes - (9.77%)				0 / 34	Steady	0 / 96	Steady	
1922	15	274,022	1.69 / 100 (Note: Of 16,257,518 votes)	3.17 / 100 (Note: Of 8,654,801 votes)	0 / 32	Steady	0 / 96	Steady	
1922	Candidate Performance: CA ▌Upton Sinclair - 56,982 votes - (6.28%); CT ▌Isadore Polsky - 6,161 votes - (1.91%); FL ▌R. L. Goodwin - 3,304 votes - (4.69%); MD ▌James L. Smiley - 2,479 votes - (0.81%); MA ▌John W. Sherman - 11,678 votes - (1.34%); MI ▌William L. Krieghoff - 4,249 votes - (0.73%); MS ▌Sumner W. Rose - 1,273 votes - (1.86%); MO ▌W. M. Brandt - 7,119 votes - (0.73%); MT ▌George H. Ambrose - 1,068 votes - (0.67%); NY ▌Algernon Lee - 117,928 votes - (4.86%); ND ▌E. R. Fry - 8,472 votes - (7.90%); OH ▌C. E. Ruthenberg - 38,186 votes - (3.29%); PA 1 (ST) ▌William J. Van Essen - 55,703 votes - (5.58%); PA 1 (LT) ▌Charles W. Ervin - 45,385 votes - (3.76%); PA 3 ▌William J. Van Essen - 38,440 votes - (2.70%); UT ▌Charles T. Stoney - 3,875 votes - (3.21%); VT ▌Norman E. Greenslet - 1,336 votes - (2.10%); WV ▌M. S. Holt - 4,895 votes - (1.26%); WY ▌W. B. Guthrie - 612 votes - (0.97%)				0 / 32	Steady	0 / 96	Steady	
1924	10	40,022	0.25 / 100 (Note: Of 14,765,193 votes)	0.74 / 100 (Note: Of 5,437,253 votes)	0 / 32	Steady	0 / 96	Steady	
1924	Candidate Performance: CO 3 ▌Clyde Robinson - 2,012 votes - (0.63%); CO 2 ▌Elwood Hillis - 1,575 votes - (0.50%); CT ▌Martin Plunkett - 1,961 votes - (1.05%); ID ▌Eugene F. Gary - 554 votes - (0.44%); IL ▌George Koop - 18,708 votes - (0.82%); KS ▌S. O. Coble - 5,340 votes - (0.87%); MI (ST) ▌Albert L. Day - 1,555 votes - (0.14%); MI (LT) ▌Albert L. Day - 1,619 votes - (0.14%); MT ▌Charles F. Juttner - 522 votes - (0.31%); WV ▌M. S. Holt - 7,751 votes - (1.36%)				0 / 32	Steady	0 / 96	Steady	
1926	13	145,643	0.84 / 100 (Note: Of 17,283,230 votes)	1.28 / 100 (Note: Of 11,344,553 votes)	0 / 32	Steady	0 / 96	Steady	
1926	Candidate Performance: CO ▌Frank H. Rice - 2,218 votes - (0.75%); IL ▌John T. Whitlock - 2,998 votes - (0.17%); IN 1 ▌William O. Fogleson - 4,864 votes - (0.47%); IN 3 ▌Forrest Wallace - 5,106 votes - (0.49%); KS ▌M. L. Phillips - 8,208 votes - (1.69%); MD ▌William A. Toole - 3,659 votes - (1.08%); MA ▌Alfred B. Lewis - 4,730 votes - (0.47%); MO (LT) ▌Robert D. Morrison - 1,807 votes - (0.18%); NY ▌Jessie W. Hughan - 73,412 votes - (2.58%); OK ▌J. A. Hart - 1,009 votes - (0.29%); PA ▌George W. Snyder - 9,869 votes - (0.66%); UT ▌C. T. Stoney - 1,310 votes - (0.91%); WI ▌Leo Krzycki - 31,317 votes - (5.74%)				0 / 32	Steady	0 / 96	Steady	
1928	17	201,859	0.69 / 100 (Note: Of 29,105,721 votes)	0.93 / 100 (Note: Of 21,781,209 votes)	0 / 32	Steady	0 / 96	Steady	
1928	Candidate Performance: CA ▌Lena M. Lewis - 26,624 votes - (1.72%); CT ▌Martin F. Plunkett - 3,014 votes - (0.55%); ID ▌FNU Lundt - 1,016 votes - (0.70%); IL ▌George R. Kirkpatrick - 13,002 votes - (0.44%); IN ▌Philip K. Reinbold - 3,346 votes - (0.24%); MD ▌William A. Toole - 2,026 votes - (0.43%); MA ▌Alfred B. Lewis - 7,675 votes - (0.50%); MI (ST) ▌Francis W. Elliott - 2,682 votes - (0.20%); MI (LT) ▌William L. Krieghoff - 2,796 votes - (0.21%); MO ▌Charles H. Harrison - 2,845 votes - (0.19%); NJ ▌Charlotte L. Bohlin - 2,267 votes - (0.16%); NY ▌McAlister Coleman - 111,208 votes - (2.62%); PA ▌William J. Van Essen - 23,100 votes - (0.76%); TX ▌David Curran - 690 votes - (0.10%); UT ▌C. T. Stoney - 998 votes - (0.57%); WV ▌M. S. Holt - 919 votes - (0.14%); WY ▌W. W. Wolfe - 333 votes - (0.41%)				0 / 32	Steady	0 / 96	Steady	
1930	12	75,684	0.45 / 100 (Note: Of 16,965,469 votes)	0.84 / 100 (Note: Of 8,994,505 votes)	0 / 32	Steady	0 / 96	Steady	
1930	Candidate Performance: CO ▌Morton Alexander - 1,745 votes - (0.54%); IL ▌George Koop - 11,192 votes - (0.50%); KS 3 ▌H. M. Perkins - 11,659 votes - (2.02%); MA ▌Sylvester J. McBride - 7,244 votes - (0.60%); MI ▌Milton E. Depew - 2,419 votes - (0.30%); MT ▌John F. McKay - 1,006 votes - (0.57%); NJ (ST) ▌Henry Jager - 4,615 votes - (0.48%); NJ (LT) ▌Henry Jager - 4,519 votes - (0.44%); NM ▌R. B. Cochran - 256 votes - (0.22%); PA ▌William J. Van Essen - 26,796 votes - (1.31%); TX ▌Guy L. Smith - 808 votes - (0.26%); VA ▌Joe C. Morgan - 7,944 votes - (5.44%)				0 / 32	Steady	0 / 96	Steady	
1932	16	453,528	1.51 / 100 (Note: Of 29,991,101 votes)	2.25 / 100 (Note: Of 20,127,476 votes)	0 / 34	Steady	0 / 96	Steady	
1932	Candidate Performance: AZ ▌Lester B. Woolever - 1,110 votes - (1.00%); CO (ST) ▌Carle Whitehead - 11,619 votes - (2.73%); CO (LT) ▌Carle Whitehead - 8,636 votes - (1.99%); CT ▌Devere Allen - 19,774 votes - (3.33%); IL ▌Charles Pogorelec - 37,922 votes - (1.19%); IA ▌T. S. McCrill - 11,076 votes - (1.11%); KS ▌E. Haldeman-Julius - 8,474 votes - (1.18%); KY ▌W. E. Sandefur - 3,291 votes - (0.34%); MD ▌William A. Toole - 8,105 votes - (1.83%); MO ▌J. G. Hodges - 11,441 votes - (0.71%); NJ ▌Herman F. Niessner - 19,060 votes - (1.27%); NY ▌Charles Solomon - 143,282 votes - (3.16%); OR ▌Joe A. Thomas - 12,266 votes - (3.47%); PA ▌William J. Van Essen - 91,456 votes - (3.29%); UT ▌John O. Watters - 2,464 votes - (1.19%); WA ▌Andrew T. Hunter - 9,364 votes - (1.55%); WI ▌Emil Seidel - 65,807 votes - (6.14%)				0 / 34	Steady	0 / 96	Steady	
1934	23	488,459	1.95 / 100 (Note: Of 25,111,853 votes)	2.45 / 100 (Note: Of 19,962,905 votes)	0 / 36	Steady	0 / 96	Steady	
1934	Candidate Performance: AZ ▌Charles D. Pinkerton - 1,591 votes - (1.69%); CA ▌George R. Kirkpatrick - 108,748 votes - (5.28%); DE ▌Fred W. Whiteside - 497 votes - (0.50%); IN ▌Forrest Wallace - 9,414 votes - (0.64%); MD ▌Elisabeth Gilman - 6,067 votes - (1.29%); MA ▌Albert S. Coolidge - 22,092 votes - (1.54%); MI ▌John Monarch - 10,644 votes - (0.87%); MN ▌Morris Kaplan - 5,618 votes - (0.56%); MO ▌W. C. Meyer - 9,010 votes - (0.68%); MT 1 ▌William F. Held - 1,381 votes - (0.68%); MT 3 ▌John F. Duffy - 1,779 votes - (0.91%); NJ ▌John S. Martin - 9,721 votes - (0.72%); NM (ST) ▌T. N. Hotchinson - 613 votes - (0.41%); NM (LT) ▌W. C. Thorp - 568 votes - (0.37%); NY ▌Norman Thomas - 194,952 votes - (5.27%); PA ▌James H. Maurer - 50,444 votes - (0.39%); TX ▌William B. Starr - 1,828 votes - (0.40%); UT ▌John O. Waters - 1,497 votes - (0.83%); VT (LT) ▌Charles R. Butler - 771 votes - (0.59%); VA ▌Herman R. Ansell - 1,127 votes - (0.78%); WA ▌John F. McKay - 7,192 votes - (1.45%); WI ▌James P. Sheehan - 44,453 votes - (4.82%); WY (LT) ▌Joseph N. Lunn - 401 votes - (0.42%)				0 / 36	Steady	0 / 96	Steady	
1936	12	40,429	0.19 / 100 (Note: Of 21,651,391 votes)	0.27 / 100 (Note: Of 14,766,916 votes)	0 / 32	Steady	0 / 96	Steady	
1936	Candidate Performance: CO ▌Carle Whithead - 4,438 votes - (0.94%); DE ▌Charles W. Perry - 183 votes - (0.14%); IL ▌Arthur McDowell - 7,405 votes - (0.20%); IA 2 ▌Laetitia M. Conrad - 1,233 votes - (0.12%); KS ▌T. C. Hager - 4,775 votes - (0.59%); KY ▌W. E. Sandefer - 541 votes - (0.06%); MA ▌Albert S. Coolidge - 9,763 votes - (0.54%); MI ▌Roy E. Mathews - 4,994 votes - (0.29%); NJ ▌Herman F. Niessner - 3,309 votes - (0.20%); OK ▌Edgar Clemons - 1,895 votes - (0.26%); TX ▌William B. Starr - 958 votes - (0.11%); WV ▌J. H. Snider - 935 votes - (0.11%)				0 / 32	Steady	0 / 96	Steady	
1938	12	183,491	0.63 / 100 (Note: Of 29,185,424 votes)	1.09 / 100 (Note: Of 16,896,367 votes)	0 / 35	Steady	0 / 96	Steady	
1938	Candidate Performance: CA ▌Lillian S. Clements - 22,569 votes - (0.89%); CO ▌Carle Whithead - 3,604 votes - (0.80%); CT ▌Bellani Trombley - 99,282 votes - (15.75%); IN ▌Louis E. Roebuck - 2,026 votes - (0.13%); MD ▌Elisabeth Gilman - 3,311 votes - (0.63%); MO ▌J. G. Hodges - 1,712 votes - (0.14%); NJ-1 ▌John Palangio - 3,671 votes - (0.24%); NY-1 ▌Harry W. Laidler - 27,161 votes - (0.60%); NY-3 ▌Herman J. Hahn - 23,553 votes - (0.51%); PA ▌David H. H. Felix - 20,155 votes - (0.53%)				0 / 35	Steady	0 / 96	Steady	
1940	9	55,439	0.14 / 100 (Note: Of 40,701,318 votes)	0.29 / 100 (Note: Of 18,881,414 votes)	0 / 34	Steady	0 / 96	Steady	
1940	Candidate Performance: CT ▌Kenneth W. Thurlow - 6,557 votes - (0.84%); IL ▌Clarence H. Mayer - 6,517 votes - (0.16%); IN ▌John H. Kingsbury - 1,751 votes - (0.10%); MD ▌Edwin B. Abbott - 4,204 votes - (0.69%); MA ▌Lyman Paine - 6,876 votes - (0.35%); MI ▌Nahum Burnett - 3,580 votes - (0.18%); MO ▌W.F. Rinck - 1,669 votes - (0.09%); NJ ▌McAlister Coleman - 8,836 votes - (0.47%); PA ▌David H. H. Felix - 15,449 votes - (0.39%)				0 / 34	Steady	0 / 96	Steady	
1942	5	14,910	0.11 / 100 (Note: Of 13,591,019 votes)	0.48 / 100 (Note: Of 3,115,683 votes)	0 / 34	Steady	0 / 96	Steady	
1942	Candidate Performance: CO-2 ▌Carle Whithead - 1,387 votes - (0.40%); CO-3 ▌Edgar P. Sherman - 1,664 votes - (0.49%); MA ▌Lyman Paine - 4,802 votes - (0.35%); MT ▌E. H. Helterbran - 1,669 votes - (0.98%); NJ ▌William L. Becker - 6,775 votes - (0.55%)				0 / 34	Steady	0 / 96	Steady	
1944	10	45,129	0.12 / 100 (Note: Of 38,551,727 votes)	0.32 / 100 (Note: Of 13,894,997 votes)	0 / 35	Steady	0 / 96	Steady	
1944	Candidate Performance: CO ▌Carle Whithead - 3,143 votes - (0.64%); CT ▌Spender Anderson - 6,033 votes - (0.73%); IN-(LT) ▌Marid B. Tomish - 1,917 votes - (0.12%); IA ▌C. W. Drescher - 744 votes - (0.07%); KS ▌Arthur G. Billings - 2,374 votes - (0.35%); MO ▌D. B. Preisler - 3,320 votes - (0.21%); NJ-1 ▌Morris Riger - 1,593 votes - (0.09%); PA ▌J. Henry Stump - 14,129 votes - (0.38%); WA ▌Ray C. Roberts - 1,912 votes - (0.23%); WI ▌Walter H. Uphoff 9,964 votes - (0.79%)				0 / 35	Steady	0 / 96	Steady	
1946	9	47,878	0.17 / 100 (Note: Of 28,938,212 votes)	0.92 / 100 (Note: Of 5,209,459 votes)	0 / 36	Steady	0 / 96	Steady	
1946	Candidate Performance: CT-(ST) ▌Frederic C. Smedly - 22,164 votes - (3.26%); CT-(LT) ▌Frederic C. Smedly - 22,012 votes - (3.22%); KY-2 ▌W. E. Sandefur - 1,638 votes - (0.27%); MO ▌W. F. Rinck - 887 votes - (0.08%); MT ▌Floyd P. Jones - 2,189 votes - (1.15%); NJ ▌Arthur Riley - 2,226 votes - (0.16%); VA-1 ▌Clarke T. Robb - 1,592 votes - (0.63%); VA-2 ▌Lawrence S. Wilkes - 7,024 votes - (2.82%); WI ▌Edwin Knappe 11,750 votes - (1.16%)				0 / 36	Steady	0 / 96	Steady	
1948	8	18,508	0.08 / 100 (Note: Of 22,885,925 votes)	0.27 / 100 (Note: Of 6,982,256 votes)	0 / 33	Steady	0 / 96	Steady	
1948	Candidate Performance: CO ▌Carle Whithead - 1,352 votes - (0.27%); DE ▌Walter B. Pollard - 80 votes - (0.06%); ID ▌Paul Wengert - 166 votes - (0.08%); IA ▌Hugo Bockewitz - 441 votes - (0.04%); KY ▌W. A. Standefur - 1,232 votes - (0.16%); MI ▌Michael Magee - 2,160 votes - (0.10%); NJ ▌Rubye Smith - 11,450 votes - (0.61%); VA ▌Clarke T. Robb - 1,627 votes - (0.42%)				0 / 33	Steady	0 / 96	Steady	
1950	2	8,836	0.03 / 100 (Note: Of 32,462,508 votes)	0.19 / 100 (Note: Of 4,664,777 votes)	0 / 36	Steady	0 / 96	Steady	
1950	Candidate Performance: PA ▌William J. Van Essen - 4,864 votes - (0.14%); WI ▌Edwin Knappe - 3,972 votes - (0.36%)				0 / 36	Steady	0 / 96	Steady	
1952	6	86,699	0.19 / 100 (Note: Of 45,351,193 votes)	0.58 / 100 (Note: Of 15,004,764 votes)	0 / 35	Steady	0 / 96	Steady	
1952	Candidate Performance: CT-1 ▌Jasper McLevy - 12,279 votes - (1.12%); CT-3 ▌William J. Taft - 3,298 votes - (0.30%); MO ▌Joseph G. Hodges - 219 votes - (0.01%); NY ▌Joseph S. Glass - 3,382 votes - (0.05%); PA ▌William J. Van Essen - 3,538 votes - (0.08%); VA ▌Clarke T. Robb - 67,281 votes - (12.38%)				0 / 35	Steady	0 / 96	Steady	
1954	1	28,922	0.11 / 100 (Note: Of 27,480,460 votes)	9.44 / 100 (Note: Of 306,510 votes)	0 / 38	Steady	0 / 96	Steady	
1954	Candidate Performance: VA ▌Clarke T. Robb - 28,922 votes - (9.44%)				0 / 38	Steady	0 / 96	Steady	
1956	1	7,079	0.02 / 100 (Note: Of 44,664,808 votes)	0.64 / 100 (Note: Of 1,113,819 votes)	0 / 35	Steady	0 / 96	Steady	
1956	Candidate Performance: CT ▌Jasper McLevy - 7,079 votes - (0.64%)				0 / 35	Steady	0 / 96	Steady	
1958	1	20,154	0.05 / 100 (Note: Of 38,047,048 votes)	4.40 / 100 (Note: Of 457,599 votes)	0 / 36	Steady	0 / 96	Steady	
1958	Candidate Performance: VA ▌Clarke T. Robb - 20,154 votes - (4.40%)				0 / 36	Steady	0 / 96	Steady	
1960	1	26,783	0.08 / 100 (Note: Of 33,672,532 votes)	4.30 / 100 (Note: Of 622,820 votes)	0 / 34	Steady	0 / 96	Steady	
1960	Candidate Performance: VA ▌Clarke T. Robb - 26,783 votes - (4.30%)				0 / 34	Steady	0 / 96	Steady	
Post-1960	No Candidates Fielded								

=== State elections ===
==== Gubernatorial elections ====
U.S. Governorships
Election	Nominees	Votes			Control				Performance Map (Note: Shades are by degrees of (1.5%))
Election	Nominees	No.	Share	Share (Where Contesting)	No. (Holding Elections)	±	No. (All Governorships)	±	Performance Map
1901	4	24,982	1.16 / 100 (Note: Of 2,152,146 votes)	1.31 / 100 (Note: Of 1,903,950 votes)	0 / 6	Steady	0 / 45	Steady	
1901	Candidate Performance: IA ▌James Baxter - 3,463 votes - (0.89%); MA ▌George H. Wrenn - 10,671 votes - (3.29%); NJ ▌Charles H. Vail - 3,489 votes - (0.97%); OH ▌Harry C. Thompson - 7,359 votes - (0.89%)				0 / 6	Steady	0 / 45	Steady	
1902	15	136,922	2.10 / 100 (Note: Of 6,510,905 votes)	2.64 / 100 (Note: Of 5,195,869 votes)	0 / 27	Steady	0 / 45	Steady	
1902	Candidate Performance: CA ▌Gideon S. Brower - 9,592 votes - (3.15%); CO ▌J. C. Provost - 7,177 votes - (3.84%); CT ▌Francis E. Wheeler - 2,804 votes - (1.76%); ID ▌August M. Slatey - 1,567 votes - (2.60%); KS ▌A. S. McAllister - 4,078 votes - (1.42%); ME ▌Charles L. Fox - 1,979 votes - (1.83%); MA ▌John C. Chase - 33,629 votes - (8.44%); MI ▌William E. Walter - 4,271 votes - (1.06%); MN ▌Jay E. Nash - 2,521 votes - (0.93%); NE ▌George E. Bigelow - 3,157 votes - (1.63%); NH ▌Michael H. O'Neil - 1,057 votes - (1.34%); NY ▌Ben Hanford - 23,400 votes - (1.68%); OR ▌R. Ryan - 3,711 votes - (4.09%); PA ▌John W. Slayton - 21,910 votes - (2.00%); SD ▌John C. Crawford - 2,620 votes - (3.52%); WI ▌Emil Seidel - 15,970 votes - (4.37%); WY ▌Henry Breitenstein - 552 votes - (2.20%)				0 / 27	Steady	0 / 45	Steady	
1903	6	47,539	1.92 / 100 (Note: Of 2,473,240 votes)	1.99 / 100 (Note: Of 2,387,427 votes)	0 / 8	Steady	0 / 45	Steady	
1903	Candidate Performance: IA ▌John M. Work - 6,421 votes - (1.54%); KY ▌Adam Nagel - 615 votes - (0.14%); MD ▌Silas M. Crabill - 1,302 votes - (0.62%); MA ▌John C. Chase - 25,251 votes - (6.37%); OH ▌Isaac Cowan - 13,467 votes - (1.55%); RI ▌James E. Furlong - 303 votes - (0.49%)				0 / 8	Steady	0 / 45	Steady	
1904	31	236,336	2.51 / 100 (Note: Of 9,403,804 votes)	2.55 / 100 (Note: Of 9,284,274 votes)	0 / 33	Steady	0 / 45	Steady	
1904	Candidate Performance: AR ▌William Penrose - 1,364 votes - (0.92%); CO ▌Andrew H. Floaten - 2,593 votes - (1.07%); CT ▌George A. Sweetland - 4,390 votes - (2.30%); DE ▌Gustave E. Reinike - 131 votes - (0.30%); FL ▌W.R. Healey - 1,270 votes - (3.47%); ID ▌Theodore B. Shaw - 4,000 votes - (5.61%); IL ▌John Collins - 59,062 votes - (5.51%); IN ▌FNU Hallenberger - 10,991 votes - (1.64%); KS ▌Granville Lowther - 12,101 votes - (3.75%); ME ▌Wilbur G. Hapgood - 1,590 votes - (1.21%); MA ▌John Quincy Adams - 11,591 votes - (2.58%); MI ▌Clayton J. Lamb - 6,170 votes - (1.18%); MN ▌Jay E. Nash - 5,810 votes - (1.91%); MO ▌Ernest T. Behrens - 11,031 votes - (1.71%); MT ▌Malcolm G. O'Malley - 3,431 votes - (5.22%); NE ▌Benjamin H. Vail - 5,122 votes - (2.28%); NH ▌Sumner F. Claflin - 943 votes - (1.07%); NJ ▌Henry R. Kearns - 8,858 votes - (2.05%); NY ▌Thomas Pendergast - 36,259 votes - (2.23%); NC ▌William A. Pegram - 109 votes - (0.05%); ND ▌Arthur Basset - 1,760 votes - (2.59%); RI ▌John E. Carney - 743 votes - (1.08%); SD ▌Freeman Knowles - 3,028 votes - (3.02%); TN ▌John M. Ray - 1,109 votes - (0.47%); TX ▌Word H. Mills - 2,847 votes - (1.02%); UT ▌Joseph A. Kauffman - 4,892 votes - (4.81%); VT ▌Clarence E. Morse - 769 votes - (1.15%); WA ▌David Burgess - 7,420 votes - (5.13%); WV ▌J. M. Eskey - 1,279 votes - (0.53%); WI ▌William A. Arnold - 24,857 votes - (5.53%); WY ▌James W. Gates - 816 votes - (2.64%)				0 / 33	Steady	0 / 45	Steady	
1905	3	31,033	2.05 / 100 (Note: Of 1,517,186 votes)	2.24 / 100 (Note: Of 1,386,606 votes)	0 / 4	Steady	0 / 45	Steady	
1905	Candidate Performance: MA ▌James F. Carey - 12,874 votes - (3.29%); OH ▌Isaac Cowan - 17,795 votes - (1.90%); RI ▌Warren A. Carpenter - 364 votes - (0.62%)				0 / 4	Steady	0 / 45	Steady	
1906	27	167,289	2.41 / 100 (Note: Of 6,954,777 votes)	2.42 / 100 (Note: Of 6,924,526 votes)	0 / 28	Steady	0 / 45	Steady	
1906	Candidate Performance: AL ▌J. N. Abbott - 417 votes - (0.58%); AR ▌Dan Hogan - 2,185 votes - (1.43%); CA ▌Austin Lewis - 16,036 votes - (5.14%); CO ▌Bill Haywood - 16,015 votes - (7.88%); CT ▌Ernest D. Hull - 2,932 votes - (1.82%); GA ▌J. B. Osburn - 148 votes - (0.16%); ID ▌Thomas F. Kelley - 4,650 votes - (6.32%); IA ▌John E. Shank - 8,728 votes - (2.02%); KS ▌Harry Gilham - 4,453 votes - (1.41%); ME ▌Charles L. Fox - 1,551 votes - (1.16%); MA ▌James F. Carey - 7,938 votes - (1.85%); MI ▌James E. Walker - 5,925 votes - (1.59%); MN ▌O. E. Lofthus - 6,516 votes - (1.68%); NE ▌Elisha Taylor - 2,999 votes - (1.57%); NV ▌Thomas B. Casey - 815 votes - (5.49%); NH ▌W.H. McFall - 1,011 votes - (1.24%); NY ▌John C. Chase - 21,751 votes - (1.47%); ND ▌L.F. Dow - 978 votes - (1.51%); OR ▌C. W. Barzee - 4,468 votes - (4.62%); PA ▌James H. Maurer - 24,793 votes - (2.46%); RI ▌Warren A. Carpenter - 395 votes - (0.59%); SD ▌Freeman Knowles - 2,542 votes - (3.41%); TN ▌John M. Ray - 900 votes - (0.44%); TX ▌George C. Edwards - 2,958 votes - (1.54%); VT ▌Timothy Sullivan - 512 votes - (0.73%); WI ▌Winfield Gaylord - 24,437 votes - (7.64%); WY ▌William L. O'Neill - 1,236 votes - (4.56%)				0 / 28	Steady	0 / 45	Steady	
1907	7	28,946	1.53 / 100 (Note: Of 1,887,320 votes)	1.56 / 100 (Note: Of 1,857,792 votes)	0 / 8	Steady	0 / 46	Steady	
1907	Candidate Performance: KY ▌Claude Andrews - 1,499 votes - (0.36%); LA ▌James Barnes - 1,247 votes - (1.79%); MD ▌Ira Culp - 1,310 votes - (0.65%); MA ▌John W. Brown - 7,621 votes - (2.04%); NJ ▌Frederick Krafft - 6,848 votes - (1.74%); OK ▌C. C. Ross - 9,740 votes - (3.89%); RI ▌William H. Johnston - 681 votes - (1.03%)				0 / 8	Steady	0 / 46	Steady	
1908	30	263,214	2.35 / 100 (Note: Of 11,210,679 votes)	2.41 / 100 (Note: Of 10,928,844 votes)	0 / 33	Steady	0 / 46	Steady	
1908	Candidate Performance: AR ▌J. Samuel Jones - 6,787 votes - (4.18%); CO ▌Henry C. Darrah - 7,972 votes - (3.03%); CT ▌Charles T. Peach - 4,827 votes - (2.55%); DE ▌J. Frank Smith - 225 votes - (0.47%); FL ▌Andrew J. Pettigrew - 2,427 votes - (5.79%); ID ▌Ernest Untermann - 6,155 votes - (6.38%); IL ▌James H. Brower - 31,293 votes - (2.71%); IN ▌Frank S. Goodman - 11,948 votes - (1.68%); IA ▌I. S. McCrillis - 7,140 votes - (1.52%); KS ▌George F. Hibner - 11,721 votes - (3.13%); ME ▌Curtis A. Perry - 1,416 votes - (0.99%); MA ▌James F. Carey - 14,430 votes - (3.26%); MI ▌Alexander M. Stirton - 9,447 votes - (1.74%); MN ▌Beecher Moore - 6,516 votes - (1.93%); MO ▌William L. Garver - 14,505 votes - (2.03%); MT ▌Harry Hazelton - 5,112 votes - (7.50%); NE ▌C. H. Harbaugh - 3,069 votes - (1.15%); NH ▌Sumner F. Claflin - 1,086 votes - (1.23%); NY ▌Joshua Wanhope - 33,994 votes - (2.07%); NC ▌J.A. Transon - 342 votes - (0.14%); OH ▌Robert Bandlow - 28,573 votes - (2.54%); RI ▌William H. Johnston - 1,321 votes - (1.80%); SD ▌J. C. Knapp - 2,542 votes - (2.15%); TN ▌W. A. Weatherall - 1,422 votes - (0.57%); TX ▌J. C. Rhodes - 8,100 votes - (2.69%); UT ▌V. R. Bohman - 4,095 votes - (3.66%); VT ▌J. H. Dunbar - 547 votes - (0.85%); WA ▌George Boomer - 4,311 votes - (2.45%); WV ▌I. W. Houston - 3,308 votes - (1.28%); WI ▌Harvey D. Brown - 28,583 votes - (6.36%)				0 / 33	Steady	0 / 46	Steady	
1909	2	11,083	1.95 / 100 (Note: Of 567,798 votes)	2.43 / 100 (Note: Of 456,110 votes)	0 / 3	Steady	0 / 46	Steady	
1909	Candidate Performance: MA ▌Dan A. White - 10,137 votes - (2.59%); RI ▌Frederick W. Hurst - 946 votes - (1.45%)				0 / 3	Steady	0 / 46	Steady	
1910	27	413,642	3.74 / 100 (Note: Of 11,065,558 votes)	4.70 / 100 (Note: Of 8,804,570 votes)	0 / 31	Steady	0 / 46	Steady	
1910	Candidate Performance: AR ▌Dan Hogan - 9,196 votes - (6.10%); CA ▌J. Stitt Wilson - 47,819 votes - (12.40%); CO ▌Henry W. Pinkham - 7,844 votes - (3.49%); CT ▌Robert Hunter - 12,179 votes - (7.33%); GA ▌C. O. Brown - 71 votes - (0.06%); ID ▌S. W. Motley - 5,342 votes - (6.20%); IA ▌John M. Work - 9,685 votes - (2.35%); KS ▌S. M. Stallard - 15,384 votes - (4.72%); ME ▌Robert V. Hunter - 1,641 votes - (1.16%); MA ▌Daniel A. White - 11,396 votes - (2.59%); MI ▌Joseph Warnock - 9,992 votes - (2.60%); MN ▌George E. Barrett - 11,173 votes - (3.79%); NE ▌Clyde J. Wright - 6,279 votes - (2.65%); NV ▌Henry F. Gegax - 1,393 votes - (6.75%); NH ▌Ash W. Drew - 1,100 votes - (1.31%); NJ ▌Wilson B. Killingbeck - 10,134 votes - (2.34%); NY ▌Charles E. Russell - 48,529 votes - (3.36%); ND ▌I. S. Lampman - 2,524 votes - (2.68%); OH ▌Tom Clifford - 60,637 votes - (6.56%); OK ▌J. T. Cumbie - 24,707 votes - (9.98%); OR ▌W. S. Richards - 8,040 votes - (6.83%); PA ▌John W. Slayton - 53,055 votes - (5.31%); SC ▌F.N.U. Thompson - 70 votes - (0.23%); TN ▌Seth McCallen - 1,707 votes - (0.67%); TX ▌Reddin Andrews - 11,538 votes - (5.27%); VT ▌Chester E. Ordway - 1,055 votes - (1.92%); WI ▌William A. Jacobs - 39,547 votes - (12.38%); WY ▌W. W. Paterson - 1,605 votes - (4.23%)				0 / 31	Steady	0 / 46	Steady	
1911	7	32,331	1.95 / 100 (Note: Of 1,344,265 votes)	2.43 / 100 (Note: Of 1,287,739 votes)	0 / 8	Steady	0 / 48	Steady	
1911	Candidate Performance: AZ ▌P. W. Gallentine - 1,247 votes - (5.77%); KY ▌Walter Lanfersiek - 8,718 votes - (2.00%); MD ▌Charles E. Develin - 3,783 votes - (1.75%); MA ▌James F. Carey - 13,355 votes - (3.04%); MS ▌Summer W. Rose - 2,049 votes - (4.82%); NM ▌T. C. Rivera - 1,787 votes - (2.94%); RI ▌Edward W. Theinert - 1,392 votes - (1.96%)				0 / 8	Steady	0 / 48	Steady	
1912	33	605,205	5.52 / 100 (Note: Of 10,961,941 votes)		0 / 33	Steady	0 / 48	Steady	
1912	Candidate Performance: AR ▌G. E. Mikel - 13,384 votes - (7.89%); CO ▌Charles A. Ashelstrom - 16,189 votes - (6.09%); CT ▌Samuel E. Beardsley - 10,236 votes - (5.38%); DE ▌Norman L. Rearick - 555 votes - (1.15%); FL ▌Thomas W. Cox - 3,467 votes - (7.15%); GA ▌A. F. Castleberry - 300 votes - (1.03%); ID ▌L. A. Coblentz - 11,094 votes - (10.51%); IL ▌John C. Kennedy - 78,679 votes - (6.77%); IN ▌Stephen N. Reynolds - 35,464 votes - (5.53%); IA ▌John M. Work - 14,986 votes - (3.25%); KS ▌George W. Kleihege - 24,767 votes - (6.89%); ME ▌George A. England - 2,081 votes - (1.47%); MA ▌Roland D. Sawyer - 11,493 votes - (2.42%); MI ▌James Hoogerhyde - 21,398 votes - (3.90%); MN ▌David Morgan - 25,769 votes - (8.09%); MO ▌William A. Ward - 28,145 votes - (4.03%); MT ▌Lewis J. Duncan - 12,566 votes - (15.75%); NE ▌Clyde J. Wright - 9,964 votes - (3.96%); NH ▌William H. Wilkins - 1,674 votes - (2.01%); NY ▌Charles E. Russell - 56,917 votes - (3.63%); NC ▌H.E. Hodges - 944 votes - (0.39%); ND ▌A. E. Bowen Jr. - 6,835 votes - (7.80%); OH ▌C. E. Ruthenberg - 87,709 votes - (8.46%); RI ▌Samuel H. Fassel - 1,913 votes - (2.45%); SC ▌R.B. Britton - 208 votes - (0.47%); SD ▌Samuel Lovett - 3,479 votes - (2.95%); TN ▌C.G. Harold - 3,053 votes - (1.23%); TX ▌Reddin Andrews - 25,258 votes - (8.39%); UT ▌Homer P. Burt - 8,797 votes - (7.89%); VT ▌Fred W. Suitor - 1,210 votes - (1.87%); WA ▌Anna A. Maley - 37,155 votes - (11.67%); WV ▌Walter B. Hilton - 15,048 votes - (5.61%); WI ▌Carl D. Thompson - 34,468 votes - (8.75%)				0 / 33	Steady	0 / 48	Steady	
1913	4	31,169	3.14 / 100 (Note: Of 992,098 votes)		0 / 4	Steady	0 / 48	Steady	
1913	Candidate Performance: AR ▌J. Emil Webber - 4,378 votes - (5.24%); MA ▌George H. Wrenn - 9,025 votes - (1.96%); NJ ▌James M. Reilly - 13,977 votes - (3.72%); VA ▌C. Campbell - 3,789 votes - (5.23%)				0 / 4	Steady	0 / 48	Steady	
1914	30	431,417	4.34 / 100 (Note: Of 9,951,704 votes)	4.37 / 100 (Note: Of 9,861,728 votes)	0 / 31	Steady	0 / 48	Steady	
1914	Candidate Performance: AL ▌W. C. Swain - 1,186 votes - (1.52%); AZ ▌J. R. Barnette - 2,973 votes - (5.83%); AR ▌Dan Hogan - 10,434 votes - (7.70%); CA ▌Noble A. Richardson - 50,716 votes - (5.47%); CO ▌Abraham Marions - 10,516 votes - (3.97%); CT ▌Samuel E. Beardsley - 5,914 votes - (3.27%); ID ▌L. A. Coblentz - 7,967 votes - (7.38%); IA ▌Oliver C. Wilson - 9,029 votes - (2.14%); KS ▌Milo M. Mitchell - 20,360 votes - (3.86%); ME ▌Percy F. Morse - 1,880 votes - (1.33%); MA ▌Samuel C. Roberts - 9,520 votes - (2.08%); MI ▌James Hoogerhyde - 11,056 votes - (2.51%); MN ▌Thomas J. Lewis - 17,225 votes - (5.02%); NE ▌George C. Porter - 5,754 votes - (2.41%); NV ▌W. A. Morgan - 3,391 votes - (15.74%); NH ▌John P. Burke - 1,423 votes - (1.69%); NY ▌Gustave A. Strebel - 37,793 votes - (2.53%); ND ▌J. A. Williams - 6,019 votes - (6.74%); OH ▌Scott Wilkins - 51,441 votes - (4.56%); OK ▌Fred W. Holt - 52,703 votes - (20.78%); OR ▌W. J. Smith - 14,284 votes - (5.76%); PA ▌Joseph B. Allen - 40,115 votes - (3.61%); RI ▌Edward W. Theinert - 1,691 votes - (2.17%); SC ▌R.B. Britton - 83 votes - (0.24%); SD ▌John C. Knapp - 2,664 votes - (2.71%); TN ▌J. N. Lotspeich - 1,671 votes - (0.65%); TX ▌E. R. Meitzen - 24,977 votes - (11.59%); VT ▌William R. Rowland - 899 votes - (1.45%); WI ▌Oscar Ameringer - 25,917 votes - (7.96%); WY ▌Paul J. Paulson - 1,816 votes - (4.19%)				0 / 31	Steady	0 / 48	Steady	
1915	4	18,175	1.32 / 100 (Note: Of 1,375,095 votes)	1.46 / 100 (Note: Of 1,245,846 votes)	0 / 5	Steady	0 / 48	Steady	
1915	Candidate Performance: KY ▌Charles Dobbs - 3,307 votes - (0.74%); MD ▌Charles E. Develin - 2,082 votes - (0.86%); MA ▌Walter S. Hutchins - 8,740 votes - (1.74%); MS ▌J. T. Lester - 4,046 votes - (7.41%)				0 / 5	Steady	0 / 48	Steady	
1916	36	435,941	3.29 / 100 (Note: Of 13,252,381 votes)		0 / 36	Steady	0 / 48	Steady	
1916	Candidate Performance: AZ ▌Peter T. Robinson - 1,975 votes - (3.38%); AR ▌William Davis - 9,730 votes - (5.54%); CO ▌C. Goddard - 12,495 votes - (4.38%); CT ▌Herbert Beebe - 5,300 votes - (2.48%); DE ▌Frank A. Houck - 490 votes - (0.96%); FL ▌C. C. Allen - 2,470 votes - (2.98%); GA ▌Thomas M. Taylor - 921 votes - (0.64%); ID ▌Annie E. Triplow - 7,321 votes - (5.44%); IL ▌Seymour Stedman - 52,316 votes - (3.96%); IN ▌William W. Farmer - 22,157 votes - (3.14%); IA ▌John W. Bennett - 8,200 votes - (1.60%); KS ▌Milo M. Mitchell - 20,360 votes - (3.86%); ME ▌E. N. Richardson - 22,552 votes - (3.88%); MA ▌Dan A. White - 10,582 votes - (2.01%); MI ▌Ernest J. Moore - 15,040 votes - (2.31%); MN ▌J. O. Bentall - 26,306 votes - (6.73%); MO ▌William J. Adames - 14,555 votes - (1.85%); MT ▌Lewis J. Duncan - 11,342 votes - (6.53%); NE ▌Benjamin Z. Millikan - 6,816 votes - (2.34%); NH ▌William H. Wilkins - 1,199 votes - (1.39%); NJ ▌Frederick Krafft - 12,900 votes - (2.89%); NM ▌N. A. Wells - 2,124 votes - (3.19%); NY ▌Algernon Lee - 62,560 votes - (3.85%); NC ▌Leonhard Miller - 590 votes - (0.21%); ND ▌Oscar A. Johnson - 2,615 votes - (2.36%); OH ▌Tom Clifford - 36,908 votes - (3.14%); RI ▌John H. Holloway - 2,167 votes - (2.45%); SC ▌J. C. Gibbes - 163 votes - (0.26%); SD ▌Fred L. Fairchild - 3,556 votes - (2.77%); TN ▌L. A. Wiles - 2,070 votes - (0.78%); TX ▌E. R. Meitzen - 14,580 votes - (4.01%); UT ▌F. M. McHugh - 4,391 votes - (3.08%); VT ▌William R. Rowland - 920 votes - (1.51%); WA ▌L. E. Katterfeld - 21,117 votes - (5.59%); WV ▌Matthew S. Holt - 5,399 votes - (1.87%); WI ▌Rae Weaver - 30,649 votes - (7.13%)				0 / 36	Steady	0 / 48	Steady	
1917	2	17,288	3.62 / 100 (Note: Of 477,840 votes)		0 / 2	Steady	0 / 48	Steady	
1917	Candidate Performance: MA ▌John McCarty - 16,608 votes - (4.28%); VA ▌Frank Smith - 680 votes - (0.76%)				0 / 2	Steady	0 / 48	Steady	
1918	19	303,603	1.65 / 100 (Note: Of 18,359,343 votes)	1.86 / 100 (Note: Of 16,362,972 votes)	0 / 32	Steady	0 / 48	Steady	
1918	Candidate Performance: AZ ▌George D. Smith - 444 votes - (0.85%); AR ▌Clay Fulks - 4,792 votes - (6.57%); CA ▌Henry H. Roser - 29,003 votes - (4.21%); CO ▌Mary L. Geffs - 5,251 votes - (2.38%); CT ▌Martin F. Plunkett - 4,001 votes - (2.39%); IA ▌Andrew Engle - 8,005 votes - (2.10%); KS ▌George W. Kleihege - 12,732 votes - (2.94%); MA ▌Sylvester J. McBride - 7,757 votes - (1.84%); MI ▌Ernest J. Moore - 7,068 votes - (1.63%); MN ▌L. P. Berot - 7,794 votes - (2.00%); NE ▌Benjamin Z. Millikan - 6,816 votes - (2.34%); NM ▌Allen H. Moulton - 847 votes - (1.80%); NY ▌Charles W. Ervin - 121,705 votes - (5.71%); OK ▌Patrick S. Nagle - 7,438 votes - (3.83%); OR ▌Benjamin F. Ramp - 6,480 votes - (4.24%); PA ▌Charles Sehl - 18,714 votes - (2.07%); RI ▌Ernest Sherwood - 1,648 votes - (2.05%); SD ▌Orville Anderson - 741 votes - (0.77%); TX ▌William D. Simpson - 1,660 votes - (0.94%); WI ▌Emil Seidel - 57,523 votes - (17.35%)				0 / 32	Steady	0 / 48	Steady	
1919	5	26,306	1.49 / 100 (Note: Of 1,760,763 votes)	1.54 / 100 (Note: Of 1,705,627 votes)	0 / 6	Steady	0 / 48	Steady	
1919	Candidate Performance: KY ▌G. D. Becker - 4,221 votes - (0.89%); MD ▌Arthur L. Blessing - 2,799 votes - (1.22%); MA ▌William A. King - 7,041 votes - (1.35%); MS ▌J. T. Lester - 1,231 votes - (3.04%); NJ ▌Albert Farr - 11,014 votes - (2.49%)				0 / 6	Steady	0 / 48	Steady	
1920	22	488,185	2.43 / 100 (Note: Of 20,101,548 votes)	2.76 / 100 (Note: Of 17,679,860 votes)	0 / 35	Steady	0 / 48	Steady	
1920	Candidate Performance: AR ▌Sam Butler - 4,534 votes - (2.38%); CT ▌Charles T. Peach - 10,154 votes - (2.77%); DE ▌William H. Conner - 1,024 votes - (1.09%); FL ▌Furman C. Whitaker - 2,823 votes - (2.13%); IL ▌Andrew Lafin - 58,998 votes - (2.79%); IN ▌Andrew J. Hart - 23,228 votes - (1.86%); IA ▌George J. Peck - 13,671 votes - (1.56%); KS ▌Roy Stanton - 12,544 votes - (2.29%); MA ▌Walter S. Hutchins - 20,079 votes - (2.09%); MI ▌Benjamin Blumenberg - 23,542 votes - (2.22%); MN ▌Peter J. Sampson - 5,124 votes - (0.65%); MO ▌Marvin M. Aldrich - 19,489 votes - (1.46%); NH ▌Frank T. Butler - 1,080 votes - (0.69%); NY ▌Joseph Cannon - 159,804 votes - (5.57%); NC ▌W. B. Taylor - 336 votes - (0.06%); OH ▌Frank B. Hamilton - 42,889 votes - (2.14%); RI ▌Ernest Sherwood - 3,292 votes - (1.95%); TN ▌J. M. Lindsley - 2,113 votes - (0.51%); TX ▌Lee L. Rhodes - 6,796 votes - (1.41%); UT ▌E. B. Locke - 2,843 votes - (1.98%); WV ▌Matthew S. Holt - 2,695 votes - (0.53%); WI ▌William Coleman - 71,126 votes - (10.29%)				0 / 35	Steady	0 / 48	Steady	
1921	No Candidates Fielded								
1922	12	263,433	1.73 / 100 (Note: Of 15,247,998 votes)	2.76 / 100 (Note: Of 9,530,894 votes)	0 / 33	Steady	0 / 48	Steady	
1922	Candidate Performance: AL ▌Arlie Barber - 1,697 votes - (1.16%); CA ▌Alexander Horr - 41,418 votes - (4.29%); CO ▌Lauren E. Arnold - 2,283 votes - (0.82%); CT ▌Martin F. Plunkett - 6,201 votes - (1.91%); KS ▌M. L. Phillips - 9,138 votes - (1.72%); MA ▌Walter S. Hutchins - 9,205 votes - (1.03%); MI ▌Benjamin Blumenberg - 4,452 votes - (0.76%); NJ ▌George A. Goebel - 5,644 votes - (0.69%); NY ▌Edward F. Cassidy - 108,136 votes - (4.27%); OK ▌O. E. Enfield - 3,941 votes - (0.77%); PA ▌Lilith M. Wilson - 31,748 votes - (2.17%); WI ▌Louis A. Arnold - 39,570 votes - (8.21%)				0 / 33	Steady	0 / 48	Steady	
1923	2	4,112	0.37 / 100 (Note: Of 1,083,111 votes)	0.42 / 100 (Note: Of 986,350 votes)	0 / 4	Steady	0 / 48	Steady	
1923	Candidate Performance: KY ▌M. A. Brinkmar - 2,647 votes - (0.40%); MD ▌William H. Champlin - 1,465 votes - (0.46%)				0 / 4	Steady	0 / 48	Steady	
1924	14	214,248	0.99 / 100 (Note: Of 21,605,235 votes)	1.55 / 100 (Note: Of 13,844,024 votes)	0 / 36	Steady	0 / 48	Steady	
1924	Candidate Performance: CT ▌Jasper McLevy - 5,168 votes - (1.39%); ID ▌Dennis J. O'Mahoney - 321 votes - (0.22%); IL ▌Andrew Lafin - 15,191 votes - (0.63%); IN ▌Francis M. Wampler - 5,984 votes - (0.48%); KS ▌M. L. Phillips - 3,606 votes - (0.55%); MA ▌Walter S. Hutchins - 6,292 votes - (0.54%); MI ▌William L. Krieghoff - 2,725 votes - (0.24%); MO ▌William M. Brandt - 21,043 votes - (1.62%); MT ▌J. H. Matheson - 466 votes - (0.27%); NY ▌Norman Thomas - 99,854 votes - (3.07%); RI ▌Frederick W. Hurst - 214 votes - (0.10%); WA ▌Emil Herman - 898 votes - (0.23%); WV ▌A. S. Bosworth - 7,218 votes - (1.26%); WI ▌William F. Quick - 45,268 votes - (5.68%)				0 / 36	Steady	0 / 48	Steady	
1925	1	1,956	0.19 / 100 (Note: Of 1,054,132 votes)	0.22 / 100 (Note: Of 909,162 votes)	0 / 2	Steady	0 / 48	Steady	
1925	Candidate Performance: NJ ▌Leo M. Harkins - 1,956 votes - (0.22%)				0 / 2	Steady	0 / 48	Steady	
1926	13	208,927	1.40 / 100 (Note: Of 14,918,649 votes)	1.94 / 100 (Note: Of 10,762,945 votes)	0 / 33	Steady	0 / 48	Steady	
1926	Candidate Performance: CA ▌Upton Sinclair - 45,972 votes - (4.02%); CO ▌Edward F. Wright - 1,508 votes - (0.49%); CT ▌Karl C. Jursek - 3,192 votes - (1.06%); KS ▌H. Hilfrich - 7,046 votes - (1.39%); MD ▌P. G'ustave Dill - 2,495 votes - (0.70%); MA ▌Walter S. Hutchins - 4,750 votes - (0.47%); NM ▌Q. M. Bixler - 274 votes - (0.25%); NY ▌Jacob Panken - 99,854 votes - (2.87%); OH ▌Joseph Sharts - 5,985 votes - (0.43%); OK ▌E. H. H. Gates - 1,350 votes - (0.35%); PA ▌John W. Slayton - 11,795 votes - (0.78%); TX ▌M. A. Smith - 786 votes - (0.29%); WI ▌Herman O. Kent - 40,293 votes - (7.29%)				0 / 33	Steady	0 / 48	Steady	
1927	No Candidates Fielded								
1928	20	197,837	0.71 / 100 (Note: Of 27,795,050 votes)	0.87 / 100 (Note: Of 22,854,466 votes)	0 / 35	Steady	0 / 48	Steady	
1928	Candidate Performance: CO ▌Samuel A. Garth - 1,873 votes - (0.52%); CT ▌Jasper McLevy - 3,184 votes - (0.58%); ID ▌Thomas J. Coonrod - 908 votes - (0.60%); IL ▌George Koop - 12,974 votes - (0.43%); IN ▌Clarence E. Bond - 3,258 votes - (0.23%); KS ▌Henry L. Peterson - 7,924 votes - (1.20%); MA ▌Mary D. Hapgood - 7,486 votes - (0.49%); MI ▌Guy H. Lockwood - 2,850 votes - (0.21%); MO ▌Joseph G. Hodges - 2,412 votes - (0.16%); MT ▌W. R. Duncan - 781 votes - (0.40%); NE ▌F. Phillip Haffner - 2,095 votes - (0.39%); NH ▌Frank T. Butler - 206 votes - (0.11%); NJ ▌W. K. Tallman - 2,041 votes - (0.14%); NY ▌Louis Waldman - 101,859 votes - (2.34%); OH ▌Joseph Sharts - 7,149 votes - (0.29%); TX ▌Lee L. Rhodes - 787 votes - (0.11%); UT ▌D. C. Dora - 740 votes - (0.42%); WA ▌Walter Price - 1,262 votes - (0.25%); WV ▌J. H. Snider - 1,124 votes - (0.18%); WI ▌Otto R. Hauser - 36,924 votes - (3.73%)				0 / 35	Steady	0 / 48	Steady	
1929	1	460	0.17 / 100 (Note: Of 269,728 votes)		0 / 1	Steady	0 / 48	Steady	
1929	Candidate Performance: VA ▌John J. Kafka - 460 votes - (0.17%)				0 / 1	Steady	0 / 48	Steady	
1930	15	251,128	1.38 / 100 (Note: Of 18,155,941 votes)	2.05 / 100 (Note: Of 12,247,061 votes)	0 / 33	Steady	0 / 48	Steady	
1930	Candidate Performance: CA ▌Upton Sinclair - 50,480 votes - (3.64%); CO ▌Claud A. Bushnell - 2,218 votes - (0.68%); CT ▌Jasper McLevy - 4,700 votes - (1.09%); KS ▌J. B. Shields - 3,866 votes - (0.62%); MD ▌Elisabeth Gilman - 4,178 votes - (0.82%); MA ▌Alfred B. Lewis - 8,222 votes - (0.67%); MI ▌George M. Campbell - 3,903 votes - (0.46%); NH ▌Fred B. Chase - 288 votes - (0.22%); NM ▌Sam Butler - 278 votes - (0.24%); NY ▌Louis Waldman - 120,444 votes - (3.82%); OR ▌Albert Streiff - 3,911 votes - (1.57%); PA ▌James H. Maurer - 21,036 votes - (1.00%); RI ▌Charles H. Dana - 1,168 votes - (0.53%); TX ▌Lee L. Rhodes - 829 votes - (0.26%); WI ▌Frank Metcalfe - 25,607 votes - (4.22%)				0 / 33	Steady	0 / 48	Steady	
1931	2	6,410	0.30 / 100 (Note: Of 2,125,782 votes)	0.31 / 100 (Note: Of 2,079,840 votes)	0 / 4	Steady	0 / 48	Steady	
1931	Candidate Performance: KY ▌John J. Thobe - 1,163 votes - (0.14%); NJ ▌Herman F. Niessner - 5,247 votes - (0.41%)				0 / 4	Steady	0 / 48	Steady	
1932	26	377,061	1.30 / 100 (Note: Of 29,006,773 votes)	1.53 / 100 (Note: Of 24,665,206 votes)	0 / 35	Steady	0 / 48	Steady	
1932	Candidate Performance: AR ▌Clay Faulks - 461 votes - (0.21%); AZ ▌Lawrence McGivern - 826 votes - (0.69%); CO ▌Morton Alexander - 6,226 votes - (1.39%); CT ▌Jasper McLevy - 20,637 votes - (3.47%); DE ▌Fred W. Whiteside - 889 votes - (0.79%); IL ▌Roy E. Burt - 39,389 votes - (1.18%); IN ▌Powers Hapgood - 18,735 votes - (1.20%); KS ▌H. M. Perkins - 3,892 votes - (0.49%); ME ▌Frank H. Maxfield - 1,137 votes - (0.47%); MA ▌Alfred B. Lewis - 24,503 votes - (0.67%); MI ▌John Panzer - 20,108 votes - (1.24%); MO ▌Louis M. Wolf - 10,921 votes - (0.68%); MT ▌Christian Yegan - 6,317 votes - (2.92%); NE ▌John M. Paul - 6,733 votes - (1.19%); NH ▌Frank T. Butler - 525 votes - (0.27%); NM ▌E. R. Frost - 1,062 votes - (0.70%); NY ▌Louis Waldman - 102,959 votes - (2.19%); OH ▌Joseph Sharts - 32,288 votes - (1.26%); RI ▌Frederick W. Hurst - 1,949 votes - (0.73%); TX ▌George C. Edwards - 1,873 votes - (0.22%); UT ▌A. L. Porter - 2,797 votes - (1.36%); VT ▌Fred W. Suitor - 1,447 votes - (1.09%); WA ▌John F. McKay - 9,987 votes - (1.62%); WV ▌J. H. Snider - 2,788 votes - (0.37%); WI ▌Frank Metcalfe - 56,965 votes - (5.07%); WY ▌A. O. Blow - 1,647 votes - (1.74%)				0 / 35	Steady	0 / 48	Steady	
1933	1	1,107	0.67 / 100 (Note: Of 166,567 votes)		0 / 1	Steady	0 / 48	Steady	
1933	Candidate Performance: VA ▌George C. White - 1,107 votes - (0.67%)				0 / 1	Steady	0 / 48	Steady	
1934	23	377,042	1.49 / 100 (Note: Of 25,342,125 votes)	1.89 / 100 (Note: Of 19,943,410 votes)	0 / 34	Steady	0 / 48	Steady	
1934	Candidate Performance: AL ▌Arlie Barber - 440 votes - (0.25%); AR ▌J. Russell Butler - 1,903 votes - (1.37%); AZ ▌Lawrence McGivern - 1,884 votes - (1.83%); CA ▌Milen C. Dempster - 2,947 votes - (0.13%); CO ▌Paul S. McCormick - 5,355 votes - (1.31%); CT ▌Jasper McLevy - 38,438 votes - (6.96%); ID ▌Allen F. Adams - 1,169 votes - (0.68%); IA ▌Arthur W. Saarman - 1,866 votes - (0.21%); KS ▌H. M. Perkins - 6,744 votes - (0.86%); MD ▌Broadus Mitchell - 6,773 votes - (1.32%); MA ▌Alfred B. Lewis - 12,282 votes - (0.83%); MI ▌Arthur E. Larsen - 12,002 votes - (0.95%); NH ▌Eli Bourdon - 278 votes - (0.16%); NJ ▌Herman F. Niessner - 8,787 votes - (0.64%); NM ▌E. R. Frost - 634 votes - (0.42%); NY ▌Charles Solomon - 126,580 votes - (3.34%); OK ▌S. P. Green - 16,688 votes - (2.66%); PA ▌Jesse H. Holmes - 42,357 votes - (1.44%); RI ▌Joseph M. Coldwell - 2,333 votes - (0.94%); TX ▌George C. Edwards - 1,862 votes - (0.42%); VT ▌John G. Hutton - 604 votes - (0.47%); WI ▌George A. Nelson - 44,589 votes - (4.68%); WY ▌Louis Sky - 527 votes - (0.56%)				0 / 34	Steady	0 / 48	Steady	
1935	1	842	0.08 / 100 (Note: Of 1,067,392 votes)	0.08 / 100 (Note: Of 1,021,511 votes)	0 / 3	Steady	0 / 48	Steady	
1935	Candidate Performance: KY ▌W. A. Sandefur - 842 votes - (0.08%)				0 / 3	Steady	0 / 48	Steady	
1936	18	155,011	0.48 / 100 (Note: Of 32,384,573 votes)	0.69 / 100 (Note: Of 22,351,360 votes)	0 / 34	Steady	0 / 48	Steady	
1936	Candidate Performance: AR ▌J. Russell Butler - 733 votes - (0.40%); AZ ▌D. J. Lindaman - 260 votes - (0.21%); CO ▌Paul S. McCormick - 1,498 votes - (0.31%); CT ▌Jasper McLevy - 20,993 votes - (3.11%); DE ▌Fred W. Whiteside - 198 votes - (0.16%); IL ▌John Fisher - 6,966 votes - (0.18%); IN ▌Marie B. Tomsich - 3,871 votes - (0.24%); IA ▌J. P. Russell - 970 votes - (0.09%); KS ▌George M. Whiteside - 3,318 votes - (0.39%); MA ▌Alfred B. Lewis - 9,483 votes - (0.52%); MI ▌John Monarch - 6,631 votes - (0.38%); MO ▌George E. Duemler - 2,807 votes - (0.15%); MT ▌J. P. Cavanaugh - 917 votes - (0.41%); NY ▌Harry W. Laidler - 86,897 votes - (1.57%); TN ▌Kate B. Stockton - 3,786 votes - (0.92%); TX ▌Carl Brannin - 962 votes - (0.11%); UT ▌A. L. Porter - 470 votes - (0.22%); WA ▌John F. McKay - 4,221 votes - (0.63%)				0 / 34	Steady	0 / 48	Steady	
1937	1	2,575	0.16 / 100 (Note: Of 1,617,483 votes)	0.18 / 100 (Note: Of 1,467,514 votes)	0 / 2	Steady	0 / 48	Steady	
1937	Candidate Performance: NJ ▌Henry Jager - 2,575 votes - (0.18%)				0 / 2	Steady	0 / 48	Steady	
1938	18	215,174	0.80 / 100 (Note: Of 26,848,060 votes)	1.51 / 100 (Note: Of 14,250,150 votes)	0 / 33	Steady	0 / 48	Steady	
1938	Candidate Performance: CT ▌Jasper McLevy - 166,253 votes - (26.30%); KS ▌Ida A. Beloof - 1,496 votes - (0.20%); MD ▌David W. Eyman - 941 votes - (0.17%); MA ▌Jeffrey W. Campbell - 5,691 votes - (0.32%); MI ▌Nahum Burnett - 2,896 votes - (0.18%); NY ▌Norman Thomas - 24,980 votes - (0.53%); PA ▌Jesse H. Holmes - 12,635 votes - (0.33%); TX ▌Earl E. Miller - 282 votes - (0.08%)				0 / 33	Steady	0 / 48	Steady	
1939	No Candidates Fielded								
1940	8	44,715	0.14 / 100 (Note: Of 31,123,981 votes)	0.38 / 100 (Note: Of 11,746,326 votes)	0 / 34	Steady	0 / 48	Steady	
1940	Candidate Performance: CO ▌Carle Whitehead - 2,211 votes - (0.41%); CT ▌Jasper McLevy - 18,090 votes - (2.31%); IN ▌Mary D. Hapgood - 4,869 votes - (0.27%); KS ▌Ida A. Beloof - 1,636 votes - (0.19%); MA ▌Jeffrey W. Campbell - 4,623 votes - (0.23%); MI ▌Seth Whitmore - 4,124 votes - (0.20%); MO ▌Jed A. High - 1,555 votes - (0.09%); NJ ▌Marion Douglas - 7,607 votes - (0.40%)				0 / 34	Steady	0 / 48	Steady	
1941	1	787	0.64 / 100 (Note: Of 122,459 votes)		0 / 1	Steady	0 / 48	Steady	
1941	Candidate Performance: VA ▌Hilliard Bernstein - 787 votes - (0.64%)				0 / 1	Steady	0 / 48	Steady	
1942	4	70,862	0.35 / 100 (Note: Of 20,134,076 votes)	1.03 / 100 (Note: Of 6,901,542 votes)	0 / 33	Steady	0 / 48	Steady	
1942	Candidate Performance: CT ▌Jasper McLevy - 34,537 votes - (6.01%); MA ▌Joseph Massidda - 3,119 votes - (0.22%); NY ▌Coleman B. Cheney - 21,911 votes - (0.53%); WI ▌Frank Zeidler - 11,295 votes - (1.41%)				0 / 33	Steady	0 / 48	Steady	
1943	1	1,563	0.09 / 100 (Note: Of 1,752,558 votes)	0.14 / 100 (Note: Of 1,149,192 votes)	0 / 4	Steady	0 / 48	Steady	
1943	Candidate Performance: NJ ▌Roy V. H. Wilkinson - 1,563 votes - (0.14%)				0 / 4	Steady	0 / 48	Steady	
1944	7	34,620	0.13 / 100 (Note: Of 27,341,233 votes)	0.37 / 100 (Note: Of 9,289,748 votes)	0 / 32	Steady	0 / 48	Steady	
1944	Candidate Performance: CT ▌Jasper McLevy - 16,475 votes - (1.99%); IN ▌William Rabe - 1,770 votes - (0.11%); IA ▌Hugo Bockewitz - 832 votes - (0.08%); KS ▌W. W. Tamplin - 2,283 votes - (0.32%); MI ▌Forest Odell - 2,851 votes - (0.13%); MO ▌W. F. Rinck - 1,226 votes - (0.08%); WI ▌George A. Nelson - 9,183 votes - (0.70%)				0 / 32	Steady	0 / 48	Steady	
1945	No Candidates Fielded								
1946	4	45,393	0.18 / 100 (Note: Of 25,138,823 votes)	1.22 / 100 (Note: Of 3,716,496 votes)	0 / 34	Steady	0 / 48	Steady	
1946	Candidate Performance: CT ▌Jasper McLevy - 32,241 votes - (4.72%); KS ▌Harry Graber - 1,830 votes - (0.32%); NJ ▌Rubye Smith - 2,326 votes - (0.16%); WI ▌Walter H. Uphoff - 8,996 votes - (0.87%)				0 / 34	Steady	0 / 48	Steady	
1947	1	1,928	0.23 / 100 (Note: Of 847,676 votes)	0.29 / 100 (Note: Of 677,479 votes)	0 / 3	Steady	0 / 48	Steady	
1947	Candidate Performance: KY ▌W. A. Sandefur - 1,928 votes - (0.29%)				0 / 3	Steady	0 / 48	Steady	
1948	9	30,561	0.11 / 100 (Note: Of 28,594,711 votes)	0.32 / 100 (Note: Of 9,667,600 votes)	0 / 33	Steady	0 / 48	Steady	
1948	Candidate Performance: CT ▌Jasper McLevy - 12,662 votes - (1.45%); IN ▌William Rabe - 985 votes - (0.06%); IA ▌William F. Leonard - 471 votes - (0.05%); KS ▌W. W. Tamplin - 2,491 votes - (0.33%); MI ▌Emanuel Seidler - 2,115 votes - (0.10%); MO ▌Ralph E. Gipe - 1,117 votes - (0.07%); MT ▌Leverne Hamilton - 905 votes - (0.41%); ND ▌George Lund - 666 votes - (0.31%); WI ▌Walter H. Uphoff - 9,149 votes - (0.72%)				0 / 33	Steady	0 / 48	Steady	
1949	1	5,569	0.28 / 100 (Note: Of 1,981,120 votes)	2.12 / 100 (Note: Of 262,332 votes)	0 / 2	Steady	0 / 48	Steady	
1949	Candidate Performance: VA ▌Clarke T. Robb - 5,569 votes - (2.12%)				0 / 2	Steady	0 / 48	Steady	
1950	4	32,686	0.11 / 100 (Note: Of 29,958,127 votes)	0.53 / 100 (Note: Of 6,175,411 votes)	0 / 33	Steady	0 / 48	Steady	
1950	Candidate Performance: CT ▌Jasper McLevy - 22,913 votes - (2.61%); KS ▌W. W. Tamplin - 1,384 votes - (0.22%); PA ▌Robert Wilson - 5,005 votes - (0.14%); WI ▌William O. Hart - 3,384 votes - (0.30%)				0 / 33	Steady	0 / 48	Steady	
1951	No Candidates Fielded								
1952	2	2,266	0.01 / 100 (Note: Of 33,325,154 votes)	0.08 / 100 (Note: Of 2,743,235 votes)	0 / 30	Steady	0 / 48	Steady	
1952	Candidate Performance: KS ▌W. W. Tamplin - 1,950 votes - (0.22%); MO ▌Maurice R. Wheeler - 316 votes - (0.02%)				0 / 30	Steady	0 / 48	Steady	
1953	No Candidates Fielded								
1954	2	12,175	0.04 / 100 (Note: Of 31,801,759 votes)	0.78 / 100 (Note: Of 1,557,963 votes)	0 / 34	Steady	0 / 48	Steady	
1954	Candidate Performance: CT ▌Jasper McLevy - 11,159 votes - (1.19%); KS ▌W. W. Tamplin - 1,016 votes - (0.16%)				0 / 34	Steady	0 / 48	Steady	
1955	No Candidates Fielded								
1956	No Candidates Fielded								
1958	1	6,853	0.02 / 100 (Note: Of 33,787,062 votes)	0.70 / 100 (Note: Of 974,509 votes)	0 / 34	Steady	0 / 49	Steady	
1958	Candidate Performance: CT ▌Jasper McLevy - 6,853 votes - (0.70%)				0 / 34	Steady	0 / 49	Steady	
Post-1958	No Candidates Fielded								

== See also ==
- Democratic Socialists of America
- Non-English press of the Socialist Party of America
- Social Democratic Party of Wisconsin
- Socialist Party of Missouri
- Socialist Party of New York
- Socialist Party of North Dakota
- Socialist Party of North Carolina
- Socialist Party of Oklahoma
- Socialist Party of Oregon
- Socialist Party of Washington
- Socialist Party of California
- Socialist Party USA
- WEVD-AM radio
- Young Democratic Socialists
- Young People's Socialist League (1907)

== Bibliography ==
=== Books ===
==== General histories ====
- Bell, Daniel, Marxian Socialism in the United States. Princeton, NJ: Princeton University Press, 1967 (revised version of his chapter in Egbert & Persons, 1952, below)
- Buhle, Paul, Marxism in the USA: From 1870 to the Present Day. London: Verso, 1987.
- Cannon, James P., The History of American Trotskyism: Report of a Participant. New York: Pioneer Publishers, 1944.
- Egbert, Donald Drew and Persons, Stow (editors), Socialism and American Life. In Two Volumes. Princeton, NJ: Princeton University Press, 1952.
- Esposito, Anthony V., The Ideology of the Socialist Party of America, 1901–1917. New York: Garland Publishing, 1997.
- Foner, Philip S., History of the Labor Movement of the United States. In Ten Volumes. New York: International Publishers, 1948–1994.
- Harrington, Michael, Socialism. New York: Saturday Review Press, 1970.
- Hillquit, Morris, History of Socialism in the United States. New York: Funk and Wagnalls, 1903; Fifth Revised and Enlarged Edition, 1910, reprinted by Dover Publications, New York, 1971.
- Johnson, Oakley C., Marxism in United States History Before the Russian Revolution (1876–1917). New York: Humanities Press, 1974.
- Kipnis, Ira, The American Socialist Movement, 1897–1912. New York: Columbia University Press, 1952. Reprinted by Haymarket Books, Chicago, 2004.
- Kraditor, Aileen S., The Radical Persuasion, 1890–1917: Aspects of the Intellectual History and the Historiography of Three American Radical Organizations. Baton Rouge, LA: Louisiana State University Press, 1981.
- Laslett John M., and Lipset, Seymour Martin (eds.), Failure of a Dream? Essays in the History of American Socialism. New York: Doubleday, 1974.
- Lipset, Seymour Martin and Marks, Gary, It Didn't Happen Here: Why Socialism Failed in the United States? New York: Norton, 2000.
- Quint, Howard, The Forging of American Socialism: Origins of the Modern Movement. Columbia, SC: University of South Carolina Press, 1953; 2nd edition (with minor revisions) Indianapolis, IN: Bobbs-Merrill, 1964
- Ross, Jack, The Socialist Party of America: A Complete History. Lincoln, NE: Potomac Books, 2015.
- Shannon, David A., The Socialist Party of America. New York: Macmillan, 1955, reprinted by Quadrangle Books, Chicago, 1967.
- Warren, Frank A., An Alternative Vision: The Socialist Party in the 1930s. Bloomington, IN: Indiana University Press, 1974.
- Weinstein, James. The Decline of Socialism in America, 1912–1925. New York: Monthly Review Press, 1967, Vintage Books 1969.

==== Topical, regional and local studies ====
- Beck, Elmer Axel, The Sewer Socialists: A History of the Socialist Party of Wisconsin, 1897–1940. In Two Volumes. Fennimore, WI: Westburg Associates, 1982.
- Bedford, Henry F., Socialism and the Workers in Massachusetts, 1886–1912, Amherst, Mass.: University of Massachusetts Press, 1966.
- Bengston, Henry, Memoirs of the Scandinavian-American Labor Movement. [1955] Kermit B. Westerberg, trans. Carbondale, IL: Southern Illinois University Press, 1999.
- Bissett, Jim, Agrarian Socialism in America: Marx, Jefferson, and Jesus in the Oklahoma Countryside, 1904–1920. Norman, OK: University of Oklahoma Press, 1999.
- Bucki, Cecelia, Bridgeport's Socialist New Deal, 1915–36. Urbana, IL: University of Illinois Press, 2001.
- Buhle, Mari Jo, Women and American Socialism, 1870–1920. Urbana, IL: University of Illinois Press, 1981.
- Buhle, Paul and Georgakas, Dan (eds.), The Immigrant Left in the United States. Albany, NY: State University of New York Press, 1996.
- Burbank, Garin, When Farmers Voted Red: The Gospel of Socialism in the Oklahoma Countryside, 1910–1924. Westport, CT: Greenwood Press, 1976.
- Critchlow, Donald T. (ed.), Socialism in the Heartland: The Midwestern Experience, 1900–1925. Notre Dame, IN: University of Notre Dame Press, 1986.
- Green, James R., Grass-Roots Socialism: Radical Movements in the Southwest, 1895–1943. Baton Rouge, LA: Louisiana State University Press, 1978.
- Horn, Max, The Intercollegiate Socialist Society, 1905–1921: Origins of the Modern American Student Movement. Boulder, CO: Westview Press, 1979.
- Hummasti, Paul George, Finnish Radicals in Astoria, Oregon, 1904–1940: A Study in Immigrant Socialism. New York: Arno Press, 1979.
- Jaffe, Julian F., Crusade Against Radicalism: New York During the Red Scare, 1914–1924. Port Washington, NY: Kennikat Press, 1972.
- Jensen, Joan M., The Price of Vigilance, Chicago: Rand McNally, 1968.
- Johnson, Jeffrey A., "They Are All Red Out Here": Socialist Politics in the Pacific Northwest, 1895–1925. Norman, OK: University of Oklahoma Press, 2008.
- Judd, Richard W., Socialist Cities: Municipal Politics and the Grass Roots of American Socialism. Albany, NY: State University Press of New York, 1989.
- Kennedy, Kathleen, Disloyal Mothers and Scurrilous Citizens: Women and Subversion During World War I. Bloomington, IN: Indiana University Press, 1999.
- Kivisto, Peter, Immigrant Socialists in the United States: The Case of the Finns and the Left. Rutherford, NJ: Farleigh Dickinson University Press, 1984.
- Laslett, John, Labor and the Left: A Study of Socialist and Radical Influences in the American Labor Movement, 1881–1924. New York: Basic Books, 1980.
- Manor, Ehud, Forward: The Jewish Daily Forward (Forverts) Newspaper: Immigrants, Socialism and Jewish Politics in New York, 1890–1917. Eastbourne, England: Sussex Academic Press, 2009.
- McCormick, John S. and John R. Sillito, A History of Utah Radicalism: Startling, Socialistic, and Decidedly Revolutionary. Logan: Utah State University Press, 2011.
- Miller, Sally M. (ed.), Flawed Liberation: Socialism and Feminism. Westport, CT: Greenwood Press, 1981.
- Nash, Michael, Conflict and Accommodation: Coal Miners, Steel Workers, and Socialism, 1890–1920. Westport, CT: Greenwood Press, 1982.
- Peterson, H.C. and Fite, Gilbert C., Opponents of War, 1917–1918. Madison, WI: University of Wisconsin Press, 1957.
- Pittenger, Mark, American Socialists and Evolutionary Thought, 1870–1920. Madison, WI: University of Wisconsin Press, 1993.
- Preston Jr., William, Aliens and Dissenters: Federal Suppression of Radicals, 1903–1933. Cambridge, MA: Harvard University Press, 1963.
- Ruff, Allen, "We Called Each Other Comrade": Charles H. Kerr & Company, Radical Publishers. Urbana, IL: University of Illinois Press, 1997.
- Sorin, Gerald, The Prophetic Minority: American Jewish Immigrant Radicals, 1880–1920. Bloomington, IN: Indiana University Press, 1985.
- Scontras, Charles A., The Socialist Alternative: Utopian Experiments and the Socialist Party of Maine, 1895–1914. Orono, ME: University of Maine, 1985.
- Wilkison, Kyle, Yeomen, Sharecroppers and Socialists: Plain Folk Protest in Texas, 1870–1914. Texas A&M University Press, 2008.

==== Biographies of leading participants ====
Arranged by alphabetic order of the first subject in the title.

- Hyfler, Robert, Prophets of the Left: American Socialist Thought in the Twentieth Century, Westport, CT: Greenwood Press, 1984.
- Miller, Sally M., Victor Berger and the Promise of Constructive Socialism, 1910–1920, Westport, CT: Greenwood Press, 1973.
- Brommel, Bernard J., Eugene V. Debs: Spokesman for Labor and Socialism, Chicago: Charles H. Kerr Publishing Co., 1978.
- Coleman, McAlister, Eugene V. Debs: A Man Unafraid, New York: Greenberg Publishers, 1930.
- Ginger, Ray, The Bending Cross: A Biography of Eugene Victor Debs, New Brunswick, NJ: Rutgers University Press, 1949.
- Morgan, H. Wayne, Eugene V. Debs: Socialist for President, Westport, CT: Greenwood Press, 1973.
- Salvatore, Nick, Eugene V. Debs: Citizen and Socialist, Urbana, IL: University of Illinois Press, 1982.
- Buhle, Paul M., A Dreamer's Paradise Lost: Louis C. Fraina/Lewis Corey (1892–1953) and the Decline of Radicalism in the United States, Atlantic Highlands, NJ: Humanities Press International, 1995.
- Perry, Jeffrey B., Hubert Harrison: The Voice of Harlem Radicalism, 1883–1918, New York: Columbian University Press, 2009.
- Pratt, Norma Fain, Morris Hillquit: A Political History of an American Jewish Socialist, Westport, CT: Greenwood Press, 1979.
- Buckingham, Peter H., Rebel Against Injustice: The Life of Frank P. O'Hare, Columbia, MO: University of Missouri Press, 1996.
- Miller, Sally M., From Prairie to Prison: The Life of Social Activist Kate Richards O'Hare, Columbia, MO: University of Missouri Press, 1993.
- Henderson, J. Paul, Darlington Hoopes: The Political Biography of an American Socialist, Glasgow, Scotland: Humming Earth, 2005.
- Miraldi, Robert, The Pen is Mightier: The Muckraking Life of Charles Edward Russell, New York: Palgrave Macmillan, 2003.
- Kreuter, Kent and Kreuter, Gretchen, An American Dissenter: The Life of Algie Martin Simons, 1870–1950, Lexington, KY: University of Kentucky Press, 1969.
- Ruotsila, Markku, John Spargo and American Socialism, New York: Palgrave Macmillan, 2006.
- Boylan, James, Revolutionary Lives: Anna Strunsky and William English Walling, Amherst, MA: University of Massachusetts Press, 1998.
- Johnson, Christopher H., Maurice Sugar: Law, Labor, and the Left in Detroit, 1912–1950, Detroit: Wayne State University Press, 1988.
- Johnpoll, Bernard K., Pacifist's Progress: Norman Thomas and the decline of American socialism, Chicago: Quadrangle Books, 1970.
- Swanberg W. A., Norman Thomas: The Last Idealist, New York: Charles Scribner's Sons, 1976.
- Shore, Elliott, Talkin' Socialism: J.A. Wayland and the Role of the Press in American Radicalism, Lawrence, KS: University Press of Kansas, 1988.

=== Articles ===
- Creel, Von Russell, "Socialists in the House: The Oklahoma Experience, Part 1", The Chronicles of Oklahoma, Vol. 70, No. 2. (Summer 1992), pp. 144–183.
- Johnson, Oakley C., "The Early Socialist Party of Michigan: An Assignment in Autobiography", The Centential Review, Vol. 10, No. 2. (Spring 1966), pp. 147–162.
- Jozwiak, Elizabeth, "Bottoms Up: The Socialist Fight for the Workingman's Saloon", Wisconsin Magazine of History, Vol. 90, No. 2. (Winter 2006–2007),. pp. 14–23.
- Kiser, G. Gregory, "The Socialist Party in Arkansas, 1900–1912", Arkansas Historical Quarterly, Vol. 40, No. 2. (Summer 1981), pp. 119–153.
- Miller, Sally M., "Socialist Party Decline and World War I: Bibliography and Interpretation", Science and Society, Vol. 34, No. 4. (Winter 1970), pp. 398–411.
- Shannon, David A., "The Socialist Party Before the First World War: An Analysis", The Mississippi Valley Historical Review, Vol. 38, No. 2. (September 1951), pp. 279–288. in JSTOR
- Strong, Bryan, "Historians and American Socialism, 1900–1920", Science and Society, Vol. 34, No. 4. (Winter 1970), pp. 387–397.
- Walker, John T., "Socialism in Dayton, Ohio, 1912 to 1925: Its Membership, Organization, and Demise", Labor History, Vol. 26, No. 3 (Summer 1985), pp. 384–404.
- Weinstein, James, "The IWW and American Socialism", Socialist Revolution, Vol. 1, No. 5 (September–October 1970), pp. 3–41.

=== Primary sources ===
- Claessens, August, Didn't We Have Fun!: Stories Out of a Long, Fruitful and Merry Life, New York: Rand School Press, 1953.
- Debs, Eugene V.:
  - Bruce Rogers (ed.), Debs: His Life, Writings and Speeches, Girard, KS: The Appeal to Reason, 1908.
  - Walls and Bars, Chicago: Socialist Party, 1927.
  - Joseph M. Bernstein (ed.), Writings and Speeches of Eugene V. Debs, New York: Hermitage Press, 1948.
  - J. Robert Constantine (ed.), Letters of Eugene V. Debs in three volumes. Urbana, IL: University of Illinois Press, 1990.
  - Tim Davenport and David Walters (eds.), The Selected Works of Eugene V. Debs in six volumes. Chicago, IL: Haymarket Books, 2019—.
- O'Hare, Kate Richards, Kate Richards O'Hare: Selected Writings and Speeches, Philip S. Foner and Sally M. Miller (eds.). Baton Rouge, LA: Louisiana State University Press, 1982.
- Fried, Albert (ed.), Socialism in America, From the Shakers to the Third International: a Documentary History, New York: Doubleday/Anchor Books, 1970
- Graham, John (ed.), "Yours for the Revolution": The Appeal to Reason, 1895–1922, Lincoln, NE: University of Nebraska Press, 1990.
- Haldeman-Julius, E., My Second 25 Years: Instead of a Footnote, An Autobiography, Girard, KS: Haldeman-Julius Publications, 1949.
- Harrington, Michael:
  - Fragments of the Century: a Social Autobiography, New York: Saturday Review Press/E.P. Dutton, 1973.
  - The Long-Distance Runner: an Autobiography, New York: Henry Holt and Company, 1988.
- Maurer, James H., It Can Be Done: The Autobiography of James H. Maurer, New York: Rand School Press, 1938.
- Hillquit, Morris, Loose Leaves from a Busy Life, New York: Macmillan, 1934.
- Johnpoll, Bernard K. and Yerburgh, Mark R., The League for Industrial Democracy: A Documentary History in three volumes, Westport, CT: Greenwood Press, 1980.
- Karsner, David, Talks with Debs in Terre Haute (and Letters from Lindlahr), New York: New York Call, 1922.
- Thomas, Norman, A Socialist's Faith, New York: W.W. Norton, 1951.
- Waldman, Louis:
  - Labor Lawyer, New York: E.P. Dutton, 1944.
  - The Good Fight: A Quest for Social Progress, Philadelphia: Dorrance and Co., 1975.
