= Sam DeWitt =

American politician

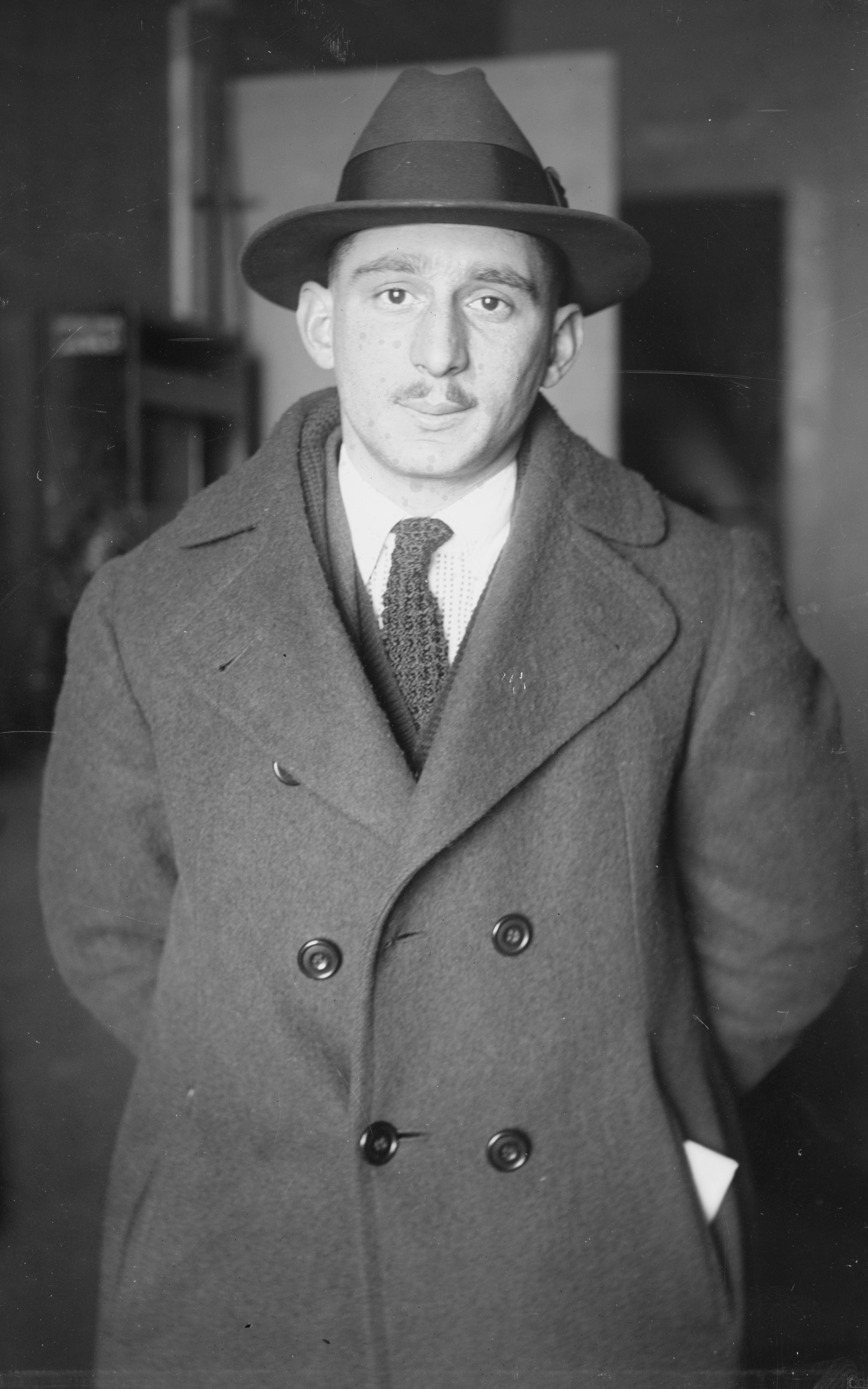
- DeWitt in 1920

Member of the New York State Assembly from the 3rd Bronx district
- In office September 16, 1920 – September 21, 1920
- Preceded by: Himself
- Succeeded by: Benjamin Antin
- In office January 1, 1920 – April 1, 1920
- Preceded by: Robert S. Mullen
- Succeeded by: Himself

Personal details
- Born: November 1, 1891 New York City, New York, U.S.
- Died: January 22, 1963 (aged 71) Yonkers, New York, U.S.
- Party: Socialist
- Spouse: Augusta
- Relatives: Sky Dayton (great-grandson)
- Occupation: Businessman; Playwright; Poet; Politician
- Known for: Expulsion from the New York State Assembly

Samuel Aaron DeWitt (November 1, 1891 – January 22, 1963) was an American businessman, poet, playwright, and politician. He was a New York State Legislator who represented Bronx's 7th district from 1919 until his expulsion from the assembly in 1920 during the First Red Scare.

== Biography ==
DeWitt was born on November 1, 1891, in New York City. He worked as a machinery dealer and was an active Socialist throughout his life. DeWitt first applied for membership in the Socialist Party on August 29, 1913.

=== Political career ===
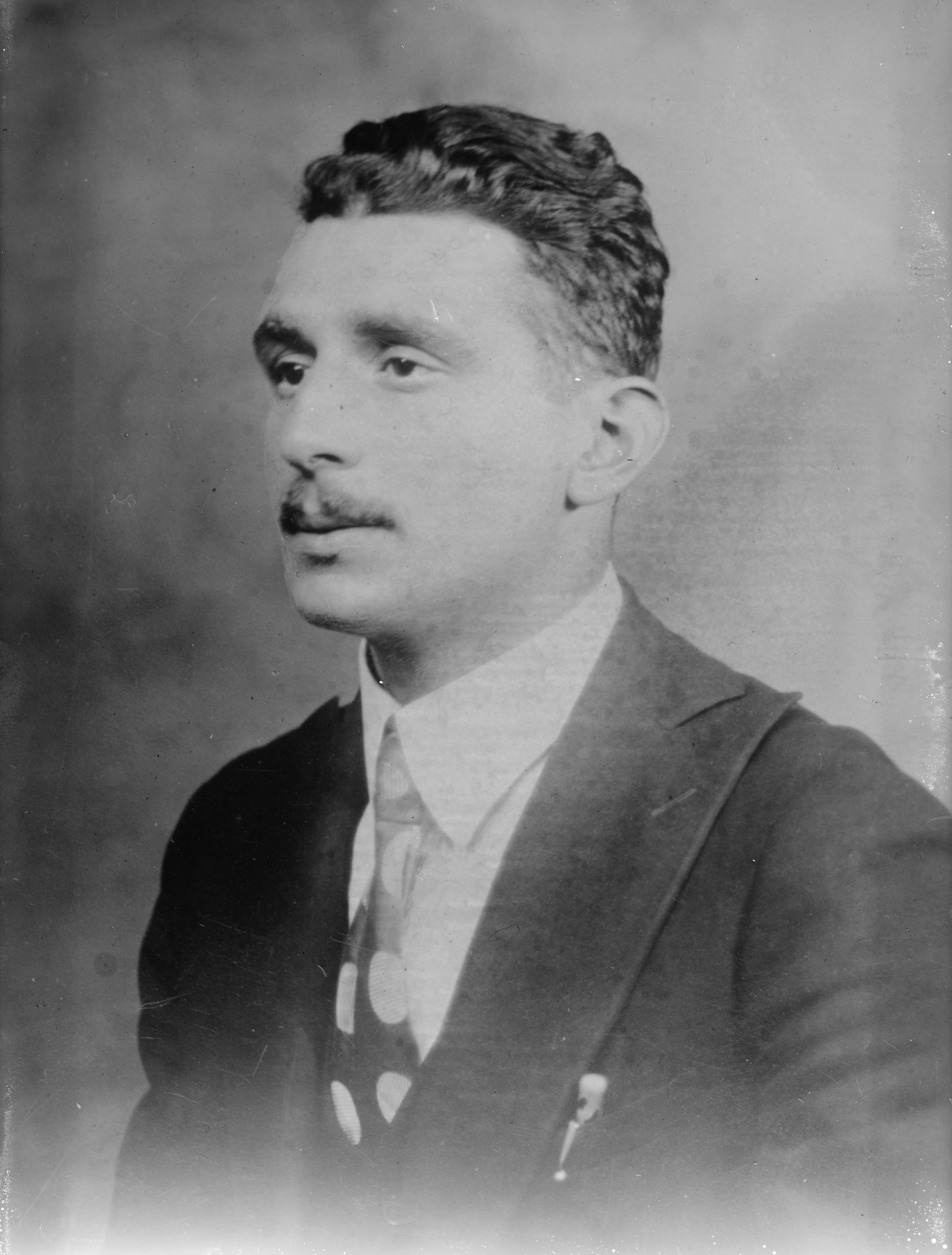
DeWitt's official State Assembly portrait, 1920

Sam Dewitt is most famous for being expelled in 1920 from the New York State Assembly along with four fellow assemblymen for being members of the Socialist Party. The five Socialists were barred from taking their seats at the beginning of the session of the 143rd New York State Legislature and, after a protracted "trial" before the Assembly Committee on the Judiciary, defended by Morris Hillquit and Seymour Stedman, were expelled on April 1. All five were re-elected at a special election on September 16, and appeared to take their seats at the beginning of the special session on September 20. The next day, DeWitt and Samuel Orr were permitted to take their seats, but August Claessens, Charles Solomon and Louis Waldman were expelled again. Protesting against the re-expulsion of their comrades, DeWitt and Orr resigned their seats.

Afterwards DeWitt was a frequent candidate for political office, without success. He ran in the Bronx 7th District in 1924 and 1926, for Bronx borough president in 1925, for the Bronx 3rd District in 1927 and 1929, and the Queens 4th District in 1932.

DeWitt made several unsuccessful campaigns for United States Congress, running in the New York's 22nd district in 1928 and the 2nd district in 1934, 1935, and 1936.

During the bitter faction fights of the 1930s in the Socialist Party, DeWitt authored a weekly piece for The Socialist Call, a newspaper published each Saturday in New York City in opposition to the journal of the Old Guard faction, The New Leader. DeWitt authored a regular column called "Turn to the Left," in which he expounded upon his political beliefs. While not accepting the Old Guard's extreme gradualist approach, neither was DeWitt a communist. With regard to the Communist Party's efforts to establish a united front in 1935, DeWitt wrote:

"I can only deplore [the Communists'] capacity for hatred. I can only distrust their sincerity when they call me to a 'united front.' I can only say to them: 'Lenin was a great teacher and undoubtedly a great leader. But he was a human.

"It is quite possible that he erred when he instructed you to treat Socialists who believed in achieving revolution through democracy in other lands, as enemies of the workers. It is also quite possible that he was wrong in his decision that all means, mostly foul, must be used against the enemies of the masses. ... It is also possible that Socialists have a right to question whether Lenin or you or any of your committees are God.'"

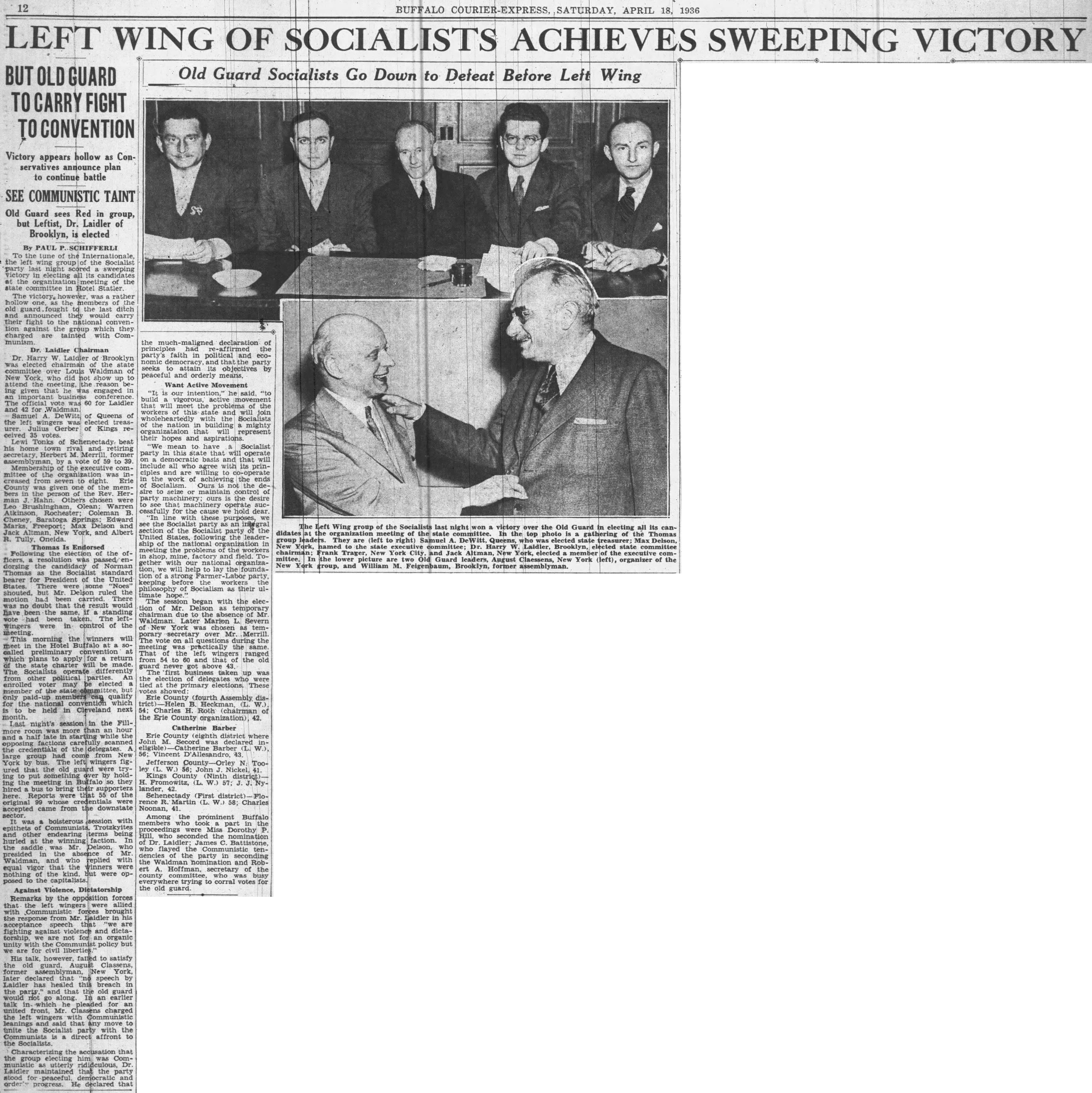
An article in the Buffalo Courier-Express detailing the victory of the Militant faction in gaining control of the Socialist Party of New York, April 18, 1936. DeWitt is on the far left in the top picture.

The battle between the Old Guard headed by Louis Waldman against a bloc of the Militant faction of Jack Altman with the "Progressive" group headed by Norman Thomas came to a head in the last days of 1935. DeWitt sided decisively with the latter grouping, breaking ranks with his long-time comrades of the Old Guard. DeWitt stood as a candidate for the New York State Committee of the SPA as part of the Progressive/Militant slate in the April 2, 1936, New York primaries and he won election in Queens County Assembly District 4. The Progressive/Militant bloc won a comfortable majority of seats on the State Committee in this election.

In a last-gasp effort to retain power, New York Socialist Party State Chairman Waldman called a snap reorganizational meeting on 3 days' notice after the certification of the primary results, to be held in the distant city of Buffalo, as was his prerogative under that state constitution. The Old Guard was defeated in this effort to outmaneuver their opposition with timing and geography, however, and Harry W. Laidler defeated Waldman in his bid for re-election at the April reorganizational meeting by a vote of 60–42. DeWitt was elected State Treasurer of the Socialist Party of New York at this session.

=== Literary endeavors ===
DeWitt was a long-time friend of left wing writer Upton Sinclair. In Sinclair's famous muckraking novel The Jungle, published in 1906, one of the main characters, Nicolas Schliemann, is said to be based on Sam DeWitt. Throughout his life, DeWitt was a poet and a playwright, publishing books in both genres.

=== Later years, death and legacy ===
In late 1919, Sam DeWitt founded the DeWitt Tool Company, located in the machine tool district of New York City. The firm bought and sold used machinery and equipment, and included among its services the liquidation of defunct industrial plants. Early on the company had for its slogan "The House of a Thousand Bargains."

The business is still in the family - now DeWitt Bros Tool Company - in Kenilworth NJ. It is a wholesaler of metal cutting tools, and is the home of Drill America.

DeWitt died on January 22, 1963, in Yonkers, New York. He was survived by his wife Augusta, who died in 1985.

== Legacy ==
DeWitt's great-grandson is Sky Dayton, founder of EarthLink.

== See also ==
- List of New York Legislature members expelled or censured

== Books by Samuel A. DeWitt ==
- Idylls of the Ghetto and Other Poems. New York: Rand Book Store, 1927.
- Riding the Storm: Poems. New York: Academy Press, n.d. [c. 1930].
- Rhapsodies in Red: Songs for the Social Revolution. New York: Rand School Press, 1933.
- Harvest: Collected Poems. New York: Burmond Press, 1937.
- The Shoemaker of the Stars and Other Poems. New York: Parnassus Press, 1940.
- Where are the Snows? A Drama of Mediæval France (in two acts & nine scenes). New York: Parnassus Press, 1941.
- Rhyme without Reason: A Comedy without Manners, in Three Acts and Six Scenes. New York: Parnassus Press, 1941.
- More Sonnets to a Dark Lady, and Others. New York: Parnassus Press, 1942.
- Where Are the Snows? A Play in Two Acts and Nine Scenes. New York: Parnassus Press, 1942.
- Words for Music: A Book of Lyrics. New York: Parnassus Press, 1942.
- Shoes for the Stars: A Play in Three Acts for Children of All Ages. New York: Parnassus Press, 1944.
- No Road Back: Poems. With Walter Mehring. New York: Curl, 1944.
- The Sermon on the Mount: Set to Rhyme and Rhythm out of the King James Version of the New Testament, the Gospel According to Matthew. New York: Strathmore Press, 1948.
- Tomorrow sings: For Voice and Piano. With Jacques Wolfe. New York: C. Fischer, 1949.
- Three Plays for Non-Puritans: Where Are the Snows? Shoes for the Stars; Rhyme without Reason. New York: Strathmore Press, 1951.
- François Villon: A Drama for Music in Two acts and Nine Scenes (an opera libretto in search of a composer). New York: Greenberg, 1956.
- The Agony of St. Joan: A Drama for Music in Two Acts and Four Scenes. (An opera libretto in search of a composer). New York: Greenberg, 1957.
- The Song of Songs. New York: Greenberg, 1957.
- Songs and Sonnets. New York: M. Loeb, 1963.
