= Louis Waldman =

American lawyer and politician (1892–1982)

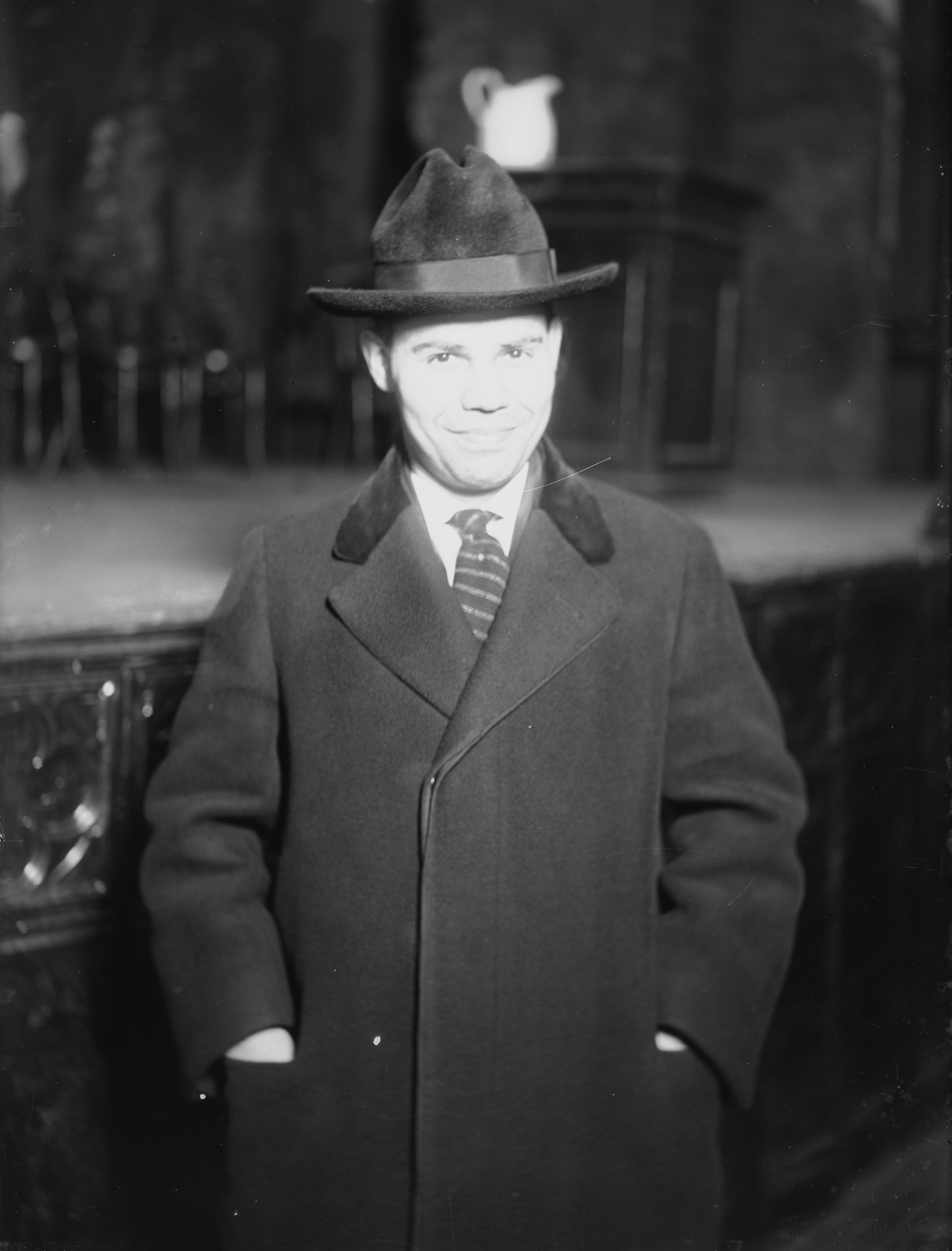
- Waldman in 1920

Member of the New York State Assembly from the 8th New York district
- In office September 16, 1920 – September 21, 1920
- Preceded by: Himself
- Succeeded by: Morris D. Reiss
- In office January 1, 1920 – April 1, 1920
- Preceded by: Herman Weiss
- Succeeded by: Himself
- In office January 1, 1918 – December 31, 1918
- Preceded by: Abraham Goodman
- Succeeded by: Herman Weiss

Personal details
- Born: January 5, 1892 Yancherudnia, Kiev Governorate, Russian Empire
- Died: September 12, 1982 (aged 90) New York City, New York, U.S.
- Party: Socialist (1911–1936); American Labor (1936–1940)
- Other political affiliations: Social Democratic (after 1936)
- Spouse: Bella B. Waldman
- Education: Cooper Union
- Occupation: Garment worker, construction engineer, labor lawyer, politician
- Known for: Expulsion from the New York State Assembly, Social Democratic Federation co-founder, New York labor lawyer

Louis Waldman (January 5, 1892 – September 12, 1982) was an American garment worker, engineer, lawyer and politician who was a leading figure in the Socialist Party of America from the late 1910s through the mid-1930s. A founding member of the Social Democratic Federation and a prominent New York labor lawyer, he was expelled from the New York State Assembly in 1920 during the First Red Scare.

== Early life ==
Louis Waldman was born on January 5, 1892, in Yancherudnia, Ukraine, not far from Kiev, the son of a Jewish innkeeper who was one of the few literate men of the village. Waldman emigrated to America in the summer 1909 at the age of 17, arriving in New York City to join his sisters on September 17. Waldman first worked in a metal shop before becoming an apprentice garment lining cutter in one of the sweatshops of the city. He joined a union and participated in the 11-week New York cloakmakers' strike of 1910, while attending high school in the evenings. Upon conclusion of the strike and resumption of his job, Waldman was fired and blacklisted for carrying out his function as a union representative in supervising the enforcement of the union contract in his shop. Barred from the garment industry, Waldman thereafter worked unsuccessfully as a door-to-door peddler of ribbon before taking a job in a cardboard box factory.

Waldman graduated from high school in the spring of 1911 and, owing to a lack of funds for college, enrolled in the Cooper Union to study engineering that fall.

Waldman witnessed the Triangle Waist Company fire of 1911. Packed into a tight space and locked away from means of escape, 146 workers from the building's 9th floor died that day in one of the greatest tragedies in New York City's history. At a memorial meeting held at Cooper Union in the aftermath of the fire, Waldman saw and heard Socialist leader Morris Hillquit speak for the first time, an event which inspired Waldman to engage in "a veritable orgy of reading" on socialism and thereby won the young man over to the socialist cause.

Waldman graduated from Cooper Union in June 1916 with a degree in engineering, and worked as a construction engineer during the day while following his ambition to become a lawyer by attending law school in the evenings.

== Career ==
=== Labor lawyer ===
He was admitted to the New York State Bar in 1923 and worked thereafter as counsel for the Amalgamated Clothing Workers of America, for the New York Central Trades and Labor Council, and for various other unions in the building and garment trades.

=== Politician ===
==== Socialist in New York Assembly ====
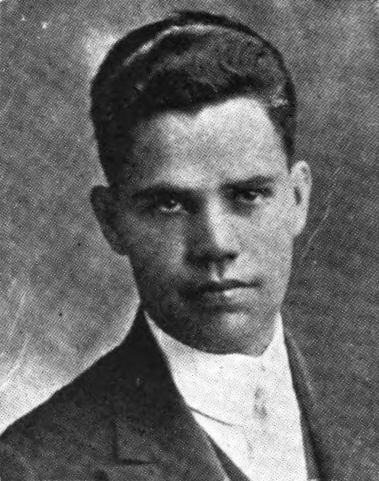
Waldman's official State Assembly portrait, 1918

In 1916 the young engineer Louis Waldman was approached at a meeting of his Socialist Party branch and was drafted into becoming a candidate of the party for the New York State Assembly. Although he protested that between his engineering job and his evening studies of law he had no time for campaigning, the party official approaching him smiled and replied, "Campaigning? Who said anything about campaigning? We just want someone to run for office. If you get more than seven hundred votes we'll be lucky. The real campaigns this year will be for Meyer London and Morris Hillquit." And thus was born a Socialist Party politician. Waldman did actually campaign, however, mounting the platform to give public speeches, at which he gradually improved. Waldman performed well in the 1916 election, tripling the Socialist tally while losing to his Democratic opponent by a few hundred votes.

In the fall of 1917, with America embroiled in the European conflict and a section of the American electorate radicalized by the turn towards war by the Democratic administration of Woodrow Wilson, Waldman ran for the Assembly again as a Socialist, this time winning election. Waldman was a member of the State Assembly (New York Co., 8th D.), sitting in the 141st New York State Legislature, one of 10 Socialists elected to the Assembly of 1918, the best electoral performance that the organization would ever achieve.

In November 1918, Waldman met with defeat, but he ran again for state assembly in 1919 against a fusion candidate of the Democratic and Republican parties and emerged victorious, along with four other Socialist Party comrades, August Claessens, Samuel Orr, Charles Solomon, and Samuel A. DeWitt. The five Socialist Assemblymen were suspended on the first day of the new legislative session by the Republican-dominated body and their expulsion trial before the Judiciary Committee of the Assembly and subsequent court fight became a cause celebre of the Red Scare. They were expelled on April 1. All five were re-elected at a special election on September 16, and appeared to take their seats at the beginning of the special session on September 20. The next day, DeWitt and Orr were permitted to take their seats, but Claessens, Solomon and Waldman were expelled again. Protesting against the re-expulsion of their comrades, DeWitt and Orr resigned their seats.

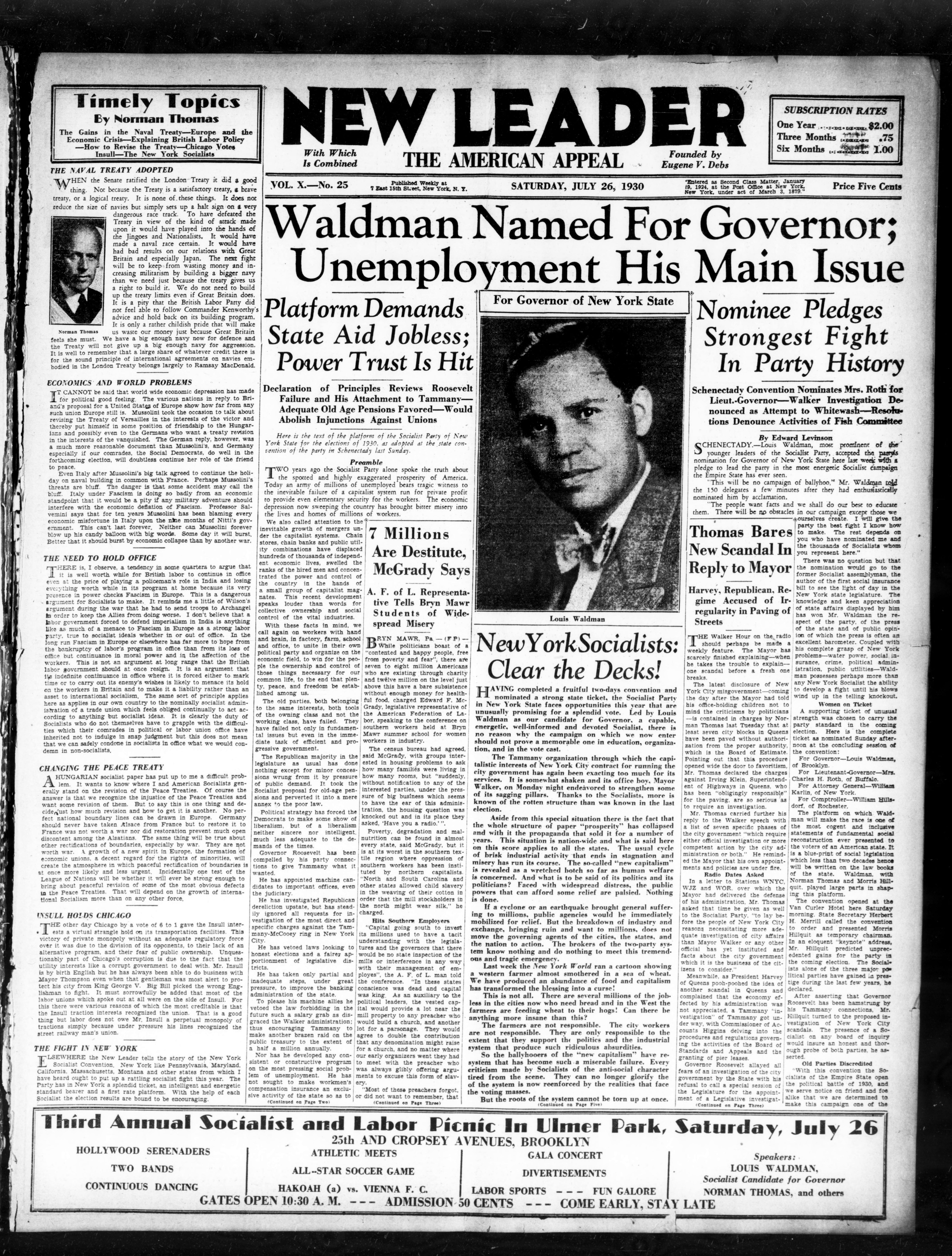
Waldman as a candidate for governor on the front page of The New Leader, July 26, 1930

Waldman was elected chairman of the Socialist Party of New York state in 1928, a position which he retained through the first half of the 1930s. In 1924, he ran on the Socialist ticket for New York Attorney General. He also stood as the SP candidate for New York Attorney General in Governor of New York in 1928, 1930 and 1932, polling over 100,000 votes in each of these races. Along with Morris Hillquit, James Oneal, and Algernon Lee, Waldman was recognized as a leader of the SP's "Old Guard" faction, which favored close working relations with the trade unions of the American Federation of Labor and pursuance of gradual ameliorative reforms leading eventually to socialism rather than cataclysmic revolutionary transformation. This perspective brought Waldman and the Old Guard into opposition of the largely youth based "Militant" faction in the party, who favored reconciliation with the Communist Party USA, in keeping with the united front policy of the Comintern and preparation for a socialist struggle for power in the event of capitalism's collapse.

==== Factional leader in 1930s ====
During the first half of the 1930s, Waldman was one of the leading figures of the so-called "Old Guard" of the Socialist Party — an organized faction based in New York City which sought to continue the party's traditional orientation towards electoral politics and close cooperation with the trade union movement. The Old Guard organized itself in opposition to a so-called "Militant faction" which emerged in 1930 and 1931, consisting of younger and more radical members who sought a turn towards direct action and a program endorsing revolutionary socialism. Although both of these main factions considered themselves orthodox Marxists, the social democratic Old Guard considered their Militant opponents to be adventurists with a deluded sense of enthusiasm for the Soviet Union and the world communist movement, while the Militants considered the Old Guard to be dyed-in-the-wood reformists unwilling to challenge anti-democratic behavior in the union movement.

Personal and personnel issues entered into play. The Militants sought to replace Socialist Party National Chairman Morris Hillquit, the best known and most widely respected of the Old Guard leaders, as an impediment to the future growth of the party. The Old Guard, similarly, sought the removal of the party's National Executive Secretary, Clarence Senior, a protégé of the charismatic spokesman for the radical wing of the party, former Presidential candidate Norman Thomas, an outspoken pacifist who had made common cause with the organized Militant group in an effort to build the SPA into a mass movement.

The critical moment in the struggle between the two main factions came in June 1934 at the Socialist Party's National Convention in Detroit, Michigan. There the assembled delegates took up debate of an aggressively anti-militarist Declaration of Principles for the party, written by Thomas ally Devere Allen. Louis Waldman was one of the key spokesmen for the Old Guard in the debate over this document at the Detroit Convention.

Waldman took issue with the clause of the proposed Declaration of Principles which called for "massed war resistance" by the party in the face of a new war":

Comrades, what does that phrase mean? 'Massed war resistance' is one of the clauses which constituted the basis of indictment of thousands of people during the last war. 'Massed war resistance' is one of those provocative phrases which is capable of all kinds of construction. What does a political party dedicated to lawful and peaceful struggle mean when it declares itself dedicated to the use of massed war resistance if it does not mean extra-legal means?...

For myself, comrades, it is inconceivable to me that I can remain a Social Democrat and become bound by this declaration....

I make my appeal to you, comrades. If we have to adjourn without a declaration I would a thousand times rather do that than commit the Socialist Party to an anarchistic, illegal, and communistic doctrine.

Following the conclusion of debate, the Declaration of Principles was approved by majority vote of the assembled delegates and the matter referred to the membership of the party for ratification by referendum vote.

The Old Guard minority issued a formal statement on the matter, calling the Declaration of Principles "inadequate and confused" and a step towards turning the SPA into an "underground organization." The Old Guard statement continued:

Existing democracy, incomplete though it be, is immensely valuable to the workers, through whose struggles it has been won. Let communists and fascists call it 'bogus.' Our duty is to defend and perfect it.

The pledge to support any 'comrade' coming into conflict with the law by any anti-war activity invites fanatics and provocators (sic.) to join the party and involve it in responsibility for acts inconsistent with socialist principles. It is also an incitement to unlawful acts. Such incitement is itself a crime, for which courts could hold every party member liable.

The membership of the party was encouraged to defeat proposed new Declaration of Principles in favor of retention of the existing 1924 Declaration.

The 1934 Declaration of Principles was ratified by the party membership nonetheless.

The factional war within the Socialist Party continued unabated for more than a year more, with the Old Guard faction ultimately exiting the party en masse to form the Social Democratic Federation (SDF) at the time of the party's May 1936 convention in Cleveland.

==== Social Democratic Federation ====
Louis Waldman as he appeared at the time of publication of his first memoir in 1944.

Waldman continued to play a leading role in the new SDF organization. An organizational meeting was held of the new group in early July, at which Waldman sought to endorse Franklin Delano Roosevelt for President of the United States in lieu of the Socialist nominee, Norman Thomas. The gathering found itself split on the issue, however, and no endorsement was forthcoming. Waldman's foes, such as New York Socialist Party Executive Secretary Jack Altman and Socialist candidate for Governor Harry W. Laidler were quick to attack Waldman, charging him with a "betrayal of Socialist principles" in attempting to "divert 100,000 Socialist votes to the Roosevelt column."

Many SDF members became involved in the American Labor Party when it was formed in 1936, supporting the faction led by David Dubinsky. Waldman however resigned from the ALP in 1940, feeling it had been taken over by a pro-Communist faction led by Sidney Hillman. It was not for another four years until Dubinsky and his supporters reached the same conclusion and bolted to form the Liberal Party.

After resigning from the ALP, Waldman had virtually no political involvements and devoted himself to his law practice, becoming one of the most distinguished labor lawyers in the nation. During this period, he represented Walter Krivitsky among others.

He was also active in the New York State Bar Association and served over the years on numerous state commissions. Representing unions as varied as the Amalgamated Clothing Workers of America and the International Longshoremen's Association, Waldman continued his practice until retiring due to a stroke in his late 80s.

=== Perspective of Civil Rights Movement ===
Like many liberals of his time, Waldman expressed sympathy for the endeavors of civil rights activists but did not agree with their tactic of breaking the law. In an article published by the New York State Bar Journal in 1965, he expressed his worries. He begins by assuring his readers that he "espoused and still [espouses] the cause of civil rights for all people" and then argues:

Those who assert rights under the Constitution and the laws made thereunder must abide by that Constitution and the law, if that Constitution is to survive. They cannot pick and choose; they cannot say they will abide by those laws which they think are just and refuse to abide by those laws which they think are unjust.... The country, therefore, cannot accept Dr. King's doctrine that he and his followers will pick and choose, knowing that it is illegal to do so. I say, such a doctrine is not only illegal and for that reason alone should be abandoned, but that it is also immoral, destructive of the principles of democratic government, and a danger to the very civil rights Dr. King seeks to promote."

In such a way, Waldman asserted: defying the law is on its face generally a bad thing because defiance would weaken respect for the law in most cases, especially if the legal system is basically decent; therefore, in order to meet this objection, those who advocated civil disobedience must have legitimate justifications to defy the law. Answering Waldman's objections, King often used such a particular argument: the evils being opposed were so serious, so numerous, and so difficult to fight that civil disobedience was a justifiable last resort. Although the means were regrettable, the end justified the means.

== Personal life and death ==
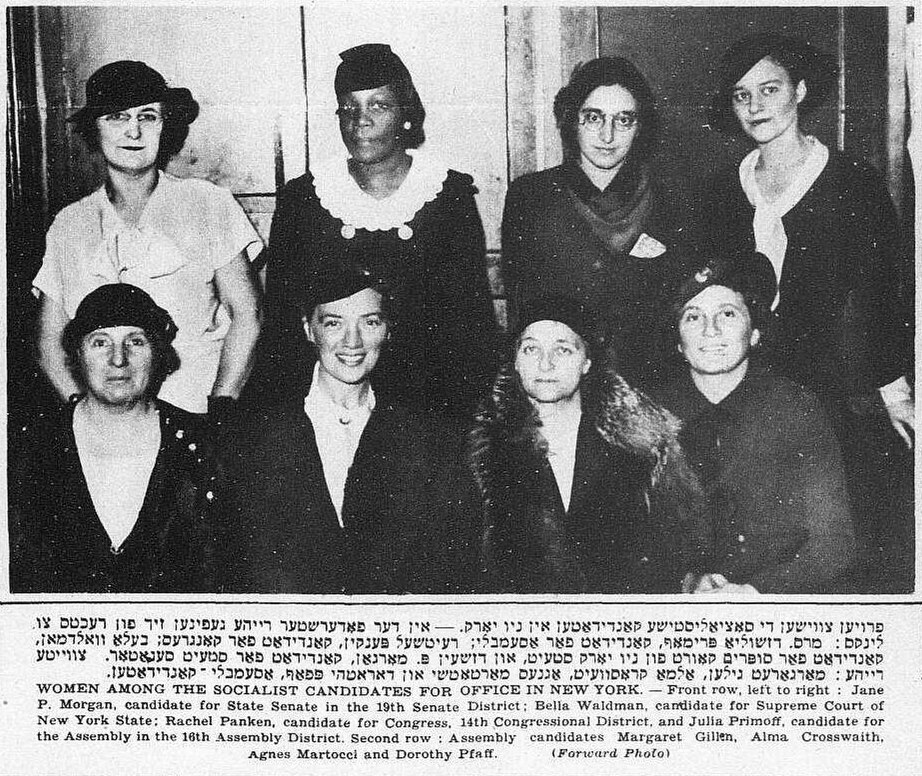
Waldman's wife Bella (seated second from left) alongside other female Socialist Party candidates, 1934

Louis Waldman married Bella B. Waldman (a Socialist candidate in her own right), with whom he had two sons.

Waldman had six sisters and two brothers, one of whom was Hyman Waldman, who followed in his older brother's footsteps as a lawyer and Socialist Party politician in addition to working with the American Labor Party and Liberal Party.

He retired age 86 after a severe stroke.

He died on September 12, 1982, at the Jewish Home and Hospital for the Aged in Manhattan, New York City. His papers reside at the New York Public Library.

== Legacy ==
=== Law firm ===
The law firm he helped found, later Vladeck, Waldman, Elias, and Engelhardt, currently Vladeck, Raskin & Clark, continues to exist in New York.

== Works ==
In 1944, Louis Waldman published his first autobiography, Labor Lawyer, in which he laid out his defense of the positions he had taken in his political career. Among other things, Waldman became very critical of the New Deal, considering it to be overly accommodating to the Communists and exhibiting certain authoritarian tendencies, somewhat echoing the critique of the old right. He was particularly alarmed by the integration of trade unions into the state apparatus that began to occur during World War II.

Labor Lawyer also represents an important primary source for the history of the Socialist Party in the years following the death of Eugene Victor Debs. It is worthy of note that many of the figures he denounces as dangerous pro-Communists in his book, such as Reinhold Niebuhr and Andrew Biemiller, would later become pillars of anti-Communist liberals of the postwar years. While Waldman himself was mostly apolitical after the war, this perspective clearly informed younger Old Guard supporters such as Morrie Ryskind and Ralph de Toledano who moved to the right from the anti-Communist left.

TIME (possibly Whittaker Chambers) reviewed the book, saying:

Waldman's experiences in the years that followed were part of the tumultuous coming of age of U.S. social consciousness... Labor Lawyer, Waldman's autobiography, is an esoteric jumble... Above all, it is an old Socialist's insistent, desperate warning against Communism as the No. 1 despoiler of the democratic ideal... Waldman believes that the strength of Communism in the U.S. is now reaching a new peak in the C.I.O.'s Political Action Committee (TIME, July 24, 1944), "the catch-all for the political activities of unions dominated by Communists, militant Socialists and others willing to cooperate with them." He concludes flatly: "Unless the New Deal casts out the seeds of left-wing totalitarianism, which it fosters today, it may either lead to an American variety of Communism, or, what is more likely, provoke an American expression of unadorned fascism."

Waldman published a second memoir, The Good Fight, in 1975.

== Works ==
=== Books and pamphlets ===
- Food and the People: The Problem of the High Cost of Living in the New York Legislature. New York: Rand School of Social Science, 1918.
- The Great Collapse: Higher Fares or Public Ownership. New York: Boni and Liveright, 1919.
- Louis Waldman, Albany: The Crisis in Government: The History of the Suspension, Trial and Expulsion from the New York State Legislature in 1920 of the Five Socialist Assemblymen by Their Political Opponents. Introduction by Seymour Stedman. New York: Boni and Liveright, 1920.
- Should unions be incorporated? Responsibility of Unions Under the Law. Washington, DC: Social Democratic Federation USA, n.d. [c. 1937].
- Waldman, Louis (1944). Labor Lawyer. New York: E.P. Dutton. ASIN B0000D5IYA.
- The Good Fight: A Quest for Social Progress. Philadelphia: Dorrance, 1975.

=== Articles ===
- "The 1932 Socialist Campaign and the American Political Scene," American Socialist Quarterly, vol. 1, no. 4 (Autumn 1932), pp. 10–21.

== See also ==
- List of New York Legislature members expelled or censured
- Walter Krivitsky
