= Haim Kantorovitch =

American socialist

Haim Kantorovitch

Haim Kantorovitch (November 4, 1890 – August 17, 1936) was an American socialist teacher, writer, and Marxist theoretician. Kantorovitch is best remembered as one of the intellectual leaders of the Militant faction of the Socialist Party of America in the early 1930s and as a founder and editor of The American Socialist Quarterly, the SP's theoretical magazine.

== Biography ==
=== Early years ===
Haim Kantorovitch was born of ethnic Jewish parents in Lakhva, Russian Empire, on November 4, 1890. Kantorovitch came to radical politics as a young man, joining the Bund (Yiddish: אַלגעמײַנער ײדישער אַרבעטער בּונד אין ליטע פוילין און רוסלאַנד — Algemeyner Yidisher Arbeter Bund in Lite, Poyln un Rusland, the General Jewish Labour Bund in Lithuania, Poland and Russia.)

Kantorovitch emigrated to the United States in 1907, following the failure of the 1905 Russian Revolution. In America he worked in the garment industry of Boston, Massachusetts making raincoats. Kantorovitch helped to unionize the factory in which he worked, with the union first affiliating with the Industrial Workers of the World before moving to the International Ladies' Garment Workers Union at a later juncture.

Kantorovitch was a native speaker of Yiddish but he was also able to read and write fluently in Russian, German, and English. He wrote two books in Yiddish — The History of the Labor Movement in America and In the Light of Marxism.

=== Political career ===
In America, Kantorovitch was initially a "labor Zionist," a member of the Poale-Zion movement, a socialist organization formed in 1903 after a split from the General Jewish Labour Bund over the question of Zionism. Highly regarded for his knowledge of political history and Marxist theory, in the 1920s Kantorovitch was employed as a teacher in the high school operated by the Workman's Circle (Yiddish: אַרבעטער־רינג — Arbeiter Ring), a Jewish fraternal organization based in New York City. Kantorovitch was also the director of the children's camps sponsored annually by the Workman's Circle organization.

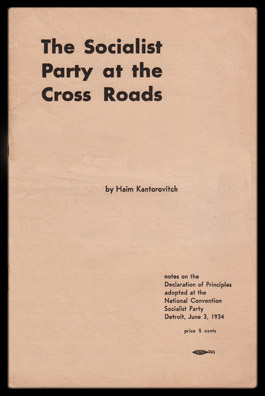
Haim Kantorovitch was the voice of the Militant faction in several influential pamphlets published during the Socialist Party's internal struggles of the 1930s.

In 1926, Kantorovitch left the Poale-Zion movement to join the successor to the Jewish Socialist Federation of the Socialist Party of America — the Jewish Socialist Verband. Kantorovitch was a frequent contributor to the publications of the Verband before becoming the editor of the official organ of the organization, a newspaper called Der Wecker.

Kantorovitch continued to teach at various Workmen's Circle schools in Baltimore, Waterbury, Newark, and New York City. While in Baltimore he published his first English-language article, "The Rise and Decline of Neo-Communism," a critical analysis of Communism and the Russian Revolution of 1917. The editor of the Modern Monthly, V.F. Calverton, was so impressed with Kantorovitch and his ideas that he was made an associate editor of the magazine, to which he frequently contributed.

As the 1930s began, Kantorovitch moved his main activity to the English-speaking Socialist movement. He was an early and enthusiastic adherent to the Militant faction of the Socialist Party which emerged in 1930-31. At the end of 1931 Kantorovitch joined forces with two teachers at the Rand School of Social Science, Anna Bercowitz and David P. Berenberg, as a founder and co-editor of the American Socialist Quarterly, a magazine dedicated to socialist theory and in depth analysis of current questions of policy. The magazine would gain official status as the theoretical journal of the Socialist Party of America during its second year of publication. It was also approximately this same time that Kantorovitch first contracted tuberculosis, the disease which would later claim his life at the age of 46.

Kantorovitch was the author of several political pamphlets advocating a move of the SPA towards a perspective of revolutionary socialism. Despite this perspective, Kantorovitch was consistently critical of the Communist Party (CPUSA), particularly hostile to the party's equation of social democrats with fascists and their activity building dual trade unions up through 1934 under the aegis of the Trade Union Unity League.

When in 1935 the Militants made common cause with the "Progressives" around SP Presidential candidate Norman Thomas and launched a newspaper of their own called The Socialist Call in opposition to the organ of the Old Guard faction, The New Leader, Kantorovitch was a regular contributor. Although in ill health throughout his life with chronic tuberculosis, he continued to write for The Call and The American Socialist up to the time of his death.

=== Death and legacy ===
Haim Kantorovitch died on August 17, 1936, at a sanitarium operated by the Workman's Circle in Liberty, New York. His body was returned to New York City, where it lay in state for two days in the auditorium of the Young Circle League, located at 15 Union Square in New York City. A funeral was held on Friday, August 21 in that same location.

Kantorovitch's death was oddly parallel to the October 1933 death from tuberculosis of his equivalent in the Old Guard faction, Morris Hillquit. Devoid of these two respected leaders, more acrimonious voices held sway within both factions of the Socialist Party. A split soon followed, with Old Guard leaders Louis Waldman and James Oneal exiting the party to form the Social Democratic Federation during the second half of 1936. Those remaining in the Socialist Party were rent by several other factional divisions, and the party's membership atrophied as a result of factional warfare and expulsions.

Kantorovitch's colleague David Berenberg eulogized his co-worker in an article published shortly after his death:

"After the death of The Class Struggle [in 1919], an interim of ten years followed during which the Socialist Party had no English publication other than the daily and weekly propaganda papers. Few, apparently, felt the need for something more substantial... For some years the writer cast about among his friends in the party in the hope of finding those few whose enthusiasm could be concretized into action. Then he found Anna Bercowitz, and through her Haim Kantorovitch, who had been making the same search independently. * * *

"For the last five years the [American Socialist Quarterly], and in the last year the [American Socialist Monthly], were Haim Kantorovitch's life. He gave to it the greater part of his time. He took its problems to the sanitorium. In the long hours of his loneliness in Los Angeles and at Liberty [NY] he pondered its future course. In his last days he summoned up the remnants of his strength to write for it an article of pungent warning to that party for which he was giving up his life. * * *

"He is gone now. Other theoreticians will arise. Other writers full of cogency and wit will fill his place. He knew he was not indispensable to the movement. But few among those who follow will have that combination of broad knowledge, deep human understanding, poetic vividness, and human kindness that made up Haim Kantorovitch. He was no angel. He had a tendency to emphasize and subtly caricature the failings of his opponents. He was often cynical and bitter. He was sometimes unjust. But these flaws in him merely prove his humanity. We who have lost him would not have had him otherwise than he was."

Haim Kantorovitch was survived by his wife, Jenny, and two daughters, Miriam ("Mary") and Malka.

== Works ==
=== Books and pamphlets ===
- Di geshikhṭe fun der Ameriḳaner arbeyṭer baṿegung. [The History of the American Labor Movement]. New York: Poalei Zion, Branch Six, 1920.
- The Rise and Decline of Neo-Communism. Baltimore, MD: The Modern Quarterly, n.d. [c. 1924].
- In likht fun Marksizm. New York: Hoyptfarkoyf: M.N. Mayzel, 1925.
- Oyfn ṿeg tsum sotsyalizm. New York: Ṿeḳer, 1930.
- A shmuʻes tsṿishn tsṿey arbeṭer: Ṿegn sotsyalizm un ḳapiṭalizm. New York: Farlag Ṿeḳer fun Idishn sotsyalisṭishn farband, 1932.
- Marksizm in unzer tzeiṭ: Zamlbuch lekoved dem 50ṭn jortzeiṭ fun Karl Marks. New York: Ṿeḳer, 1933.
- Towards Socialist Reorientation. ASQ American Socialist Quarterly Reprints no. 1. Chicago, IL: Education Committee, Socialist Party of America, n.d. [c. 1933].
- The Socialist Party at the Cross Roads: Notes on the Declaration of Principles Adopted at the National Convention, Socialist party, Detroit, June 3, 1934. New York, NY: Max Delson, 1934.
- Problems of Revolutionary Socialism. New York, NY: American Socialist Monthly, 1936.

=== Articles ===
- "The New Capitalism — And After," American Socialist Quarterly, vol. 1, no. 1 (January 1932), pp. 17–32.
- "The Social Philosophy of Marxism," American Socialist Quarterly, Part 1: vol. 1, no. 2 (April 15, 1932), pp. 44–52. Part 2: vol. 1, no. 3 (Summer 1932), pp. 42–49.
- "Proletarian Literature in America," American Socialist Quarterly, vol. 2, no. 1 (Winter 1933), pp. 3–11.
- "Living Marxism," American Socialist Quarterly, vol. 2, no. 2 (Spring 1933), pp. 17–26.
- "The German Tragedy: A Warning to International Socialism," American Socialist Quarterly, vol. 2, no. 3 (Summer 1933), pp. 3–13.
- "Towards Reorientation," American Socialist Quarterly, vol. 2, no. 4 (Autumn 1933), pp. 13–19.
- "The Socialism of the Hopeless," American Socialist Quarterly, vol. 3, no. 1 (Spring 1934), pp. 47–53.
- "Refreshing Voices from Germany," American Socialist Quarterly, vol. 3, no. 2 (Summer 1934), pp. 51–56.
- "Notes of a Marxist," American Socialist Quarterly, vol. 3, no. 3 (Autumn 1934), pp. 9–34.
- "The United Front," American Socialist Quarterly, vol. 3, no. 4 (December 1934), pp. 16–25.
- "Marxism for Today," The Socialist Call, Part 1: vol. 1, no. 2 (March 13, 1935), pg. 5. Part 2: vol. 1, no. 3 (April 6, 1935), pg. 8. Part 3: vol. 1, no. 7 (May 4, 1935), pg. 8. Part 4: vol. 1, no. 8 (May 11, 1935), pg. 8. Part 5: vol. 1, no. 9 (May 18, 1935), pg. 8. Part 6: vol. 1, no.10 (May 25, 1935), pg. 8.
- "Reflections: May Day, 1935," The Socialist Call, vol. 1, no. 6 (April 27, 1935), pg. 20.
- "Problems of Revolutionary Socialism," The Socialist Call, Part 1: vol. 1, no. 16 (July 6, 1935), pg. 3. Part 2: vol. 1, no. 17 (July 13, 1935), pg. 9. Part 3: vol. 1, no. 18 (July 20, 1935), pg. 10. Part 4: vol. 1, no. 19 (July 27, 1935), pp. 8–9. Part 5: vol. 1, no. 20 (August 3, 1935), pg. 8. Part 6: vol. 1, no. 21 (August 19, 1935), pg. 8.
- "The Socialist Party and the Trade Unions," American Socialist Quarterly, vol. 4, no. 3 (November 1935), pp. 34–44.
- "The Thomas-Browder Debate," The Socialist Call, vol. 1, no. 38 (December 7, 1935), pg. 9.
- "The Old Guard: An Analysis of its History and of its Principles," The Socialist Call, vol. 1, no. 39 (December 14, 1935), sec. 2, pg. 1.
- "Book Review: What is Communism? by Earl Browder," American Socialist Quarterly, vol. 5, no. 2 (April 1936), pp. 28–29.
- "Notes on the United Front Problem," American Socialist Quarterly, vol. 5, no. 3 (May 1936), pp. 7–11.
- "The Left Wing at the Cleveland Convention," American Socialist Quarterly, vol. 5, no. 5 (July 1936), pp. 8–12.
- "On Reading Trotsky's Book The Third International After Lenin," American Socialist Quarterly, vol. 5, no. 6 (August 1936), pp. 29–32.
- "Some Notes on an All-Inclusive Party," American Socialist Monthly, vol. 5, no. 8 (December 1936), pp. 14–16.

=== Translations ===
- Heinrich Ehrlich, The Struggle for Revolutionary Socialism. Translation by Haim Kantorovitch and Anna Bercowitz. New York: Bund Club of New York, 1934.
