= August Claessens =

American politician (1885–1954)

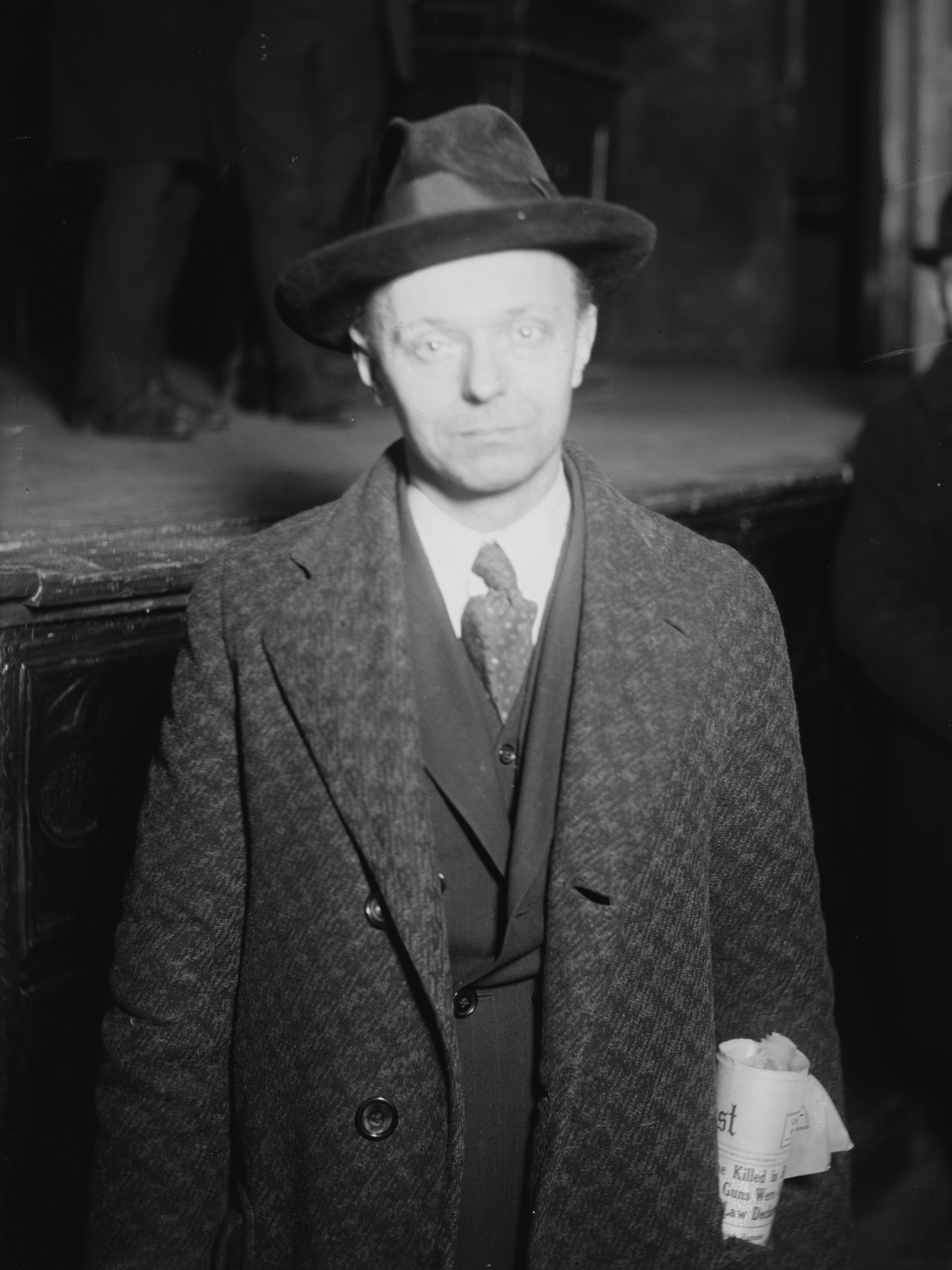
- Claessens in 1920

Member of the New York State Assembly from the 17th New York district
- In office February 28, 1922 – December 31, 1922
- Preceded by: Murray Felenstein
- Succeeded by: Meyer Alterman
- In office September 16, 1920 – September 21, 1920
- Preceded by: Himself
- Succeeded by: Nathan Lieberman
- In office January 1, 1918 – April 1, 1920
- Preceded by: Martin Bourke
- Succeeded by: Himself

Personal details
- Born: June 17, 1885 Bern, Switzerland
- Died: December 9, 1954 (aged 69) New York City, New York, U.S.
- Party: Socialist (before 1936); American Labor (1936–1944); Liberal (after 1944)
- Other political affiliations: Social Democratic Federation (after 1936)
- Spouse(s): Hilda Goldstein; Anna Glassman
- Children: 2
- Education: Cooper Union
- Occupation: Clerk, teacher, politician
- Known for: Expulsion from the New York State Assembly

August "Gus" Claessens (June 17, 1885 – December 9, 1954) was a Swiss-born American socialist politician, best known as one of the five New York Assemblymen expelled from that body during the First Red Scare for their membership in the Socialist Party of America.

Claessens was three times a candidate for United States Congress, running on the Socialist ticket in 1914, 1924, and 1934. He later served as Executive Secretary and National Chairman of the Social Democratic Federation, a factional offshoot of the Socialist Party.

== Biography ==
=== Early life ===
August Claessens was born in Bern, Switzerland, on June 17, 1885. He was raised by his mother and a step-father, the latter of whom worked as a house painter. His family emigrated to America in 1890 and he grew up in New York, educated in both Roman Catholic and public schools.

Claessens went to work at age 14 and worked variously as a newsboy, grocery clerk, and shipping clerk.

Claessens took part in self-directed study through the Cooper Union and the Rand School of Social Science in New York City. While at the Rand School Claessens became interested in socialism and the Yiddish language, both joining the Socialist Party of America and becoming proficient in Yiddish by 1909. Claessens would actively participate in the predominantly Jewish socialist movement in New York City for the rest of his life.

Well equipped by his Rand School training, Claessens was soon engaged as a public speaker and organizer on behalf of the organization, touring coast to coast. He also was a frequent speaker at public meetings of the Workmen's Circle (Arbeiter Ring), a predominantly Yiddish-language fraternal benefit organization.

In 1914, Claessens was employed as an instructor in public speaking at the Rand School. He also taught extension classes in Labor and Management for Rutgers University and was a volunteer speaker and organizer for various New York trade union locals. Throughout his life he taught night school courses on an array of topics, including public speaking, parliamentary procedure, psychology and social psychology, race relations, socialist theory, contemporary politics, anthropology, and sex and society.

Early in his tenure as a teacher at the Rand School, Claessens met a student named Hilda Goldstein, who he subsequently married. The pair traveled the country together as Socialist speakers.

=== Political career ===
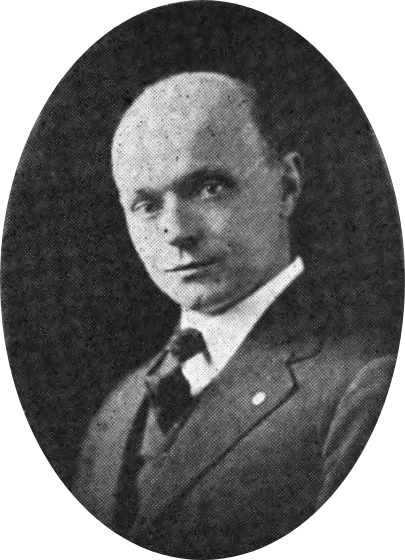
Claessens's official State Assembly portrait, 1918

Gus Claessens made his first run for political office in 1914, when he stood for United States Congress as a candidate of the Socialist Party in 1914.

During World War I Claessens supported the majority of the Socialist Party in opposition to the war. He ran in the 26th District of New York County for New York State Assembly: Democrat Meyer Levy polled 2,885 votes; the incumbent Progressive/Republican Joseph Steinberg polled 2,673 votes, and Claessens polled 1,207. Able to campaign effectively both in Yiddish and English, Claessens won easy election in November 1917 in the 17th Assembly District. Claessens subsequently won election twice, being a member of the State Assembly in 1918, 1919 and 1920.

On the first day of the 1920 session, however, Republican Speaker of the House Thaddeus C. Sweet brought the five elected Socialist Assemblyman before the house and pushed through a resolution suspending them from the body pending a trial, coming just a week after the Palmer Raids of the First Red Scare. The five Assemblymen — Claessens, Charles Solomon, Samuel A. DeWitt, Louis Waldman, and Samuel Orr — were represented in a trial before the Assembly by Morris Hillquit and Seymour Stedman in an event which became a cause célèbre among liberals, radicals, and civil libertarians across the nation.

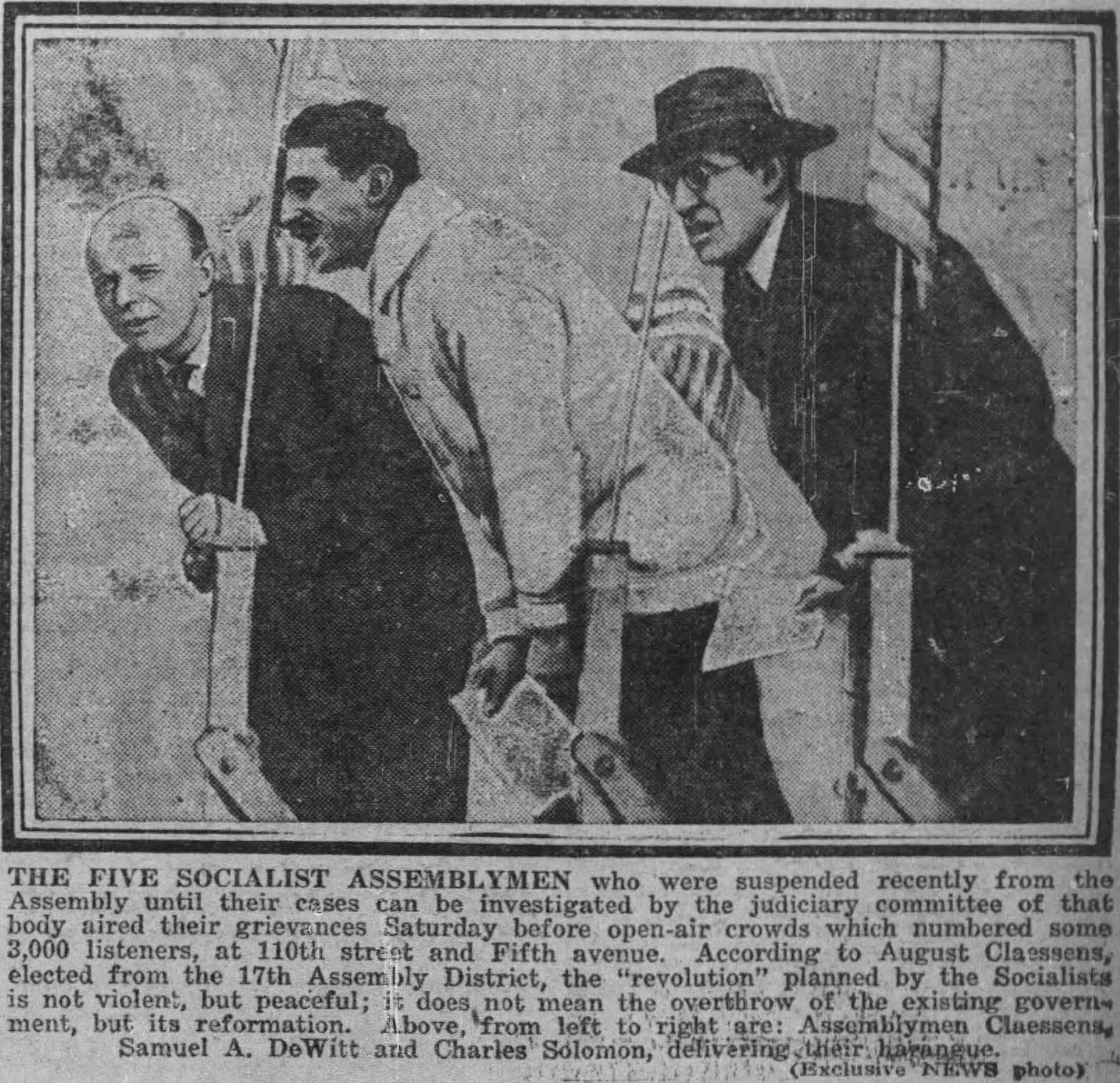
Clipping from the New York Daily News, January 12, 1920

On April 1, 1920, the quintet were expelled from the Assembly, despite vociferous public protest. All five were re-elected at a special election on September 16, and appeared to take their seats at the beginning of the special session on September 20. The next day, DeWitt and Orr were permitted to take their seats, but Claessens, Solomon and Waldman were expelled again. Protesting against the re-expulsion of their comrades, DeWitt and Orr resigned their seats.

Claeesens contested the election of Democrat Murray Felenstein to the 145th New York State Legislature, and was seated on February 28, 1922.

Claessens again ran for Congress as a Socialist in the fall of 1924, once again falling to defeat. In the New York state election, 1926, he ran on the Socialist ticket for Lieutenant Governor of New York; and in November 1927 for New York City Alderman from the 6th Ward. At the New York state election, 1934, Claessens ran for Congress in New York's At-large congressional district.

=== Party split ===
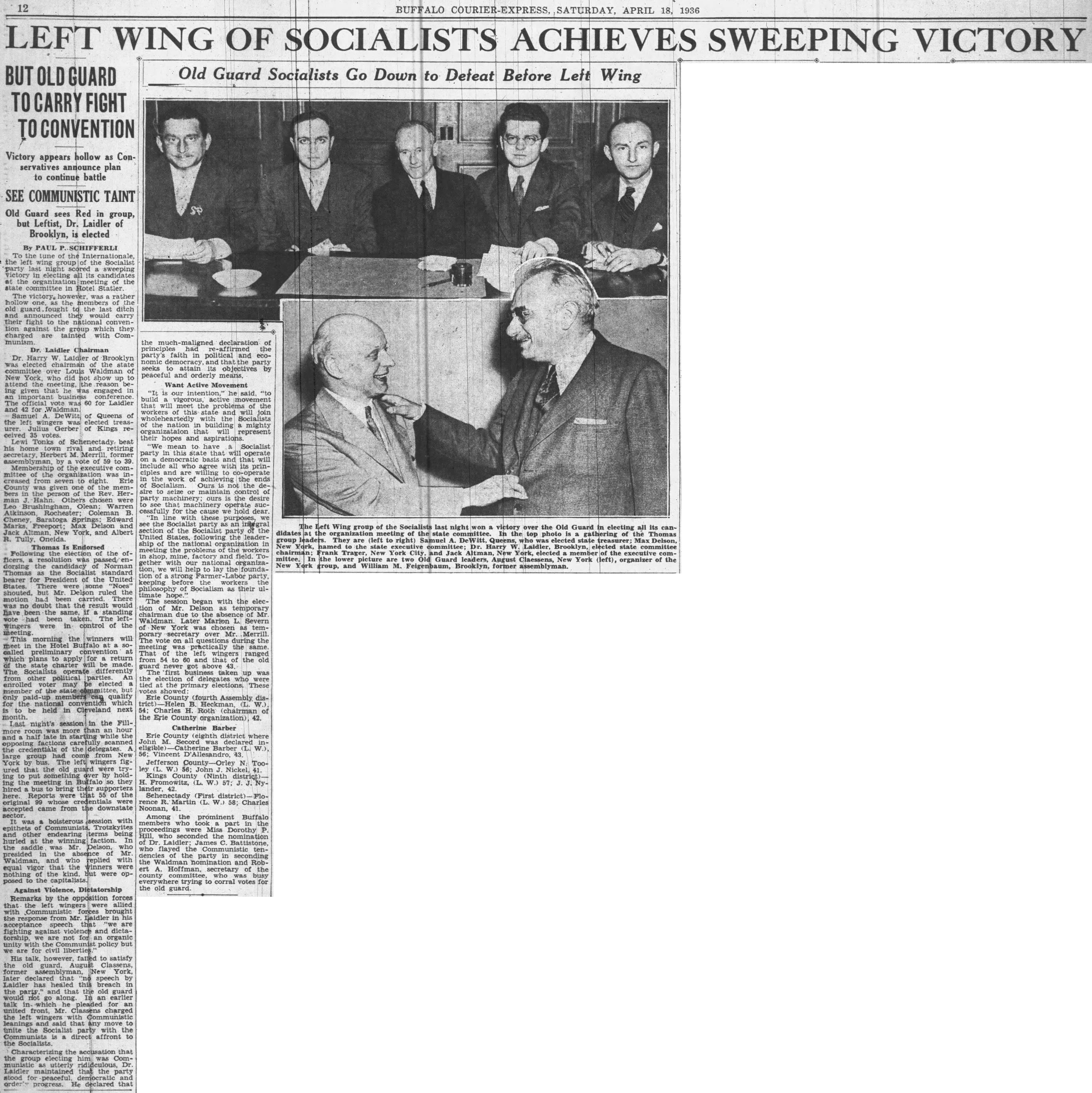
An article in the Buffalo Courier-Express detailing the victory of the Militant faction in gaining control of the Socialist Party of New York, April 18, 1936. Claessens is on the left in the bottom picture.

During the factional conflict within the Socialist Party during the 1930s, Claessens stood with the so-called "Old Guard" faction led by Hillquit, James Oneal, and Louis Waldman. After the youthful radical "Militant" faction won the day at the 1934 National Convention, passing an aggressive new Statement of Principles, Claessens joined his "Old Guard" comrades in an exodus from the party to establish the Social Democratic Federation (SDF).

In the middle 1930s, Claessens served as Executive Secretary of the SDF and was later elected to the position of National Chairman, a post which he held until his death in 1954.

Claessens was active in the American Labor Party during its early years and stood for election to the New York Assembly as part of a joint ALP-Republican ticket in 1938. He was defeated in the effort along with all 14 of the other American Labor candidates of the ill-considered ALP-Republican slate.

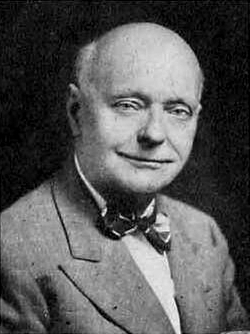
Claessens c. 1953

In 1944, Claessens joined with Socialist Party leaders Harry Laidler and Paul Blanshard in attempting to defeat the Communist-dominated faction which had gained control of the ALP. Failing to win control of that organization, Claessens and his associates withdrew that same year and established the Liberal Party of New York as a rival organization. Claessens would be a Liberal Party candidate for the State Assembly several times, failing to win election.

=== Death and legacy ===
Gus Claessens was twice married. His first wife, the former Hilda Goldstein, was a union organizer who died in 1932. His second wife, the former Anna Glassman, survived him at the time of his death.

Claessens died of a heart attack on December 9, 1954, in Brooklyn, New York. His body was interred at Cedar Grove Cemetery, located in Flushing, Queens, New York.

Claessens' papers reside at the Tamiment Library and Robert F. Wagner Labor Archives of Bobst Library at New York University.

== Works ==
- The Socialists in the New York Assembly: The Work of Ten Socialist Members During the Legislative Session of 1918. With William Morris Feigenbaum. New York: Rand School of Social Science, 1918.
- The Logic of Socialism. New York: Rand School of Social Science, n.d. [c. 1921]. (Also translated into Polish).
- The Trinity of Plunder: A Cheerful Slam at Rent, Interest and Profit. Illustrations by Ryan Walker. New York: New York Call, 1922. (Also translated into Slovenian).
- Is Socialism Inevitable? An Explanation of the Forces of Social Progress. Chicago: Socialist Party of the United States, 1922.
- Essentials of Socialism: A Brief Exposition of the Principal Elements of Modern Socialism. New York: Rand School Press, 1933.
- A Manual for Socialist Speakers: A Brief Text Book on the Technique of Public Speaking and Socialist Propaganda Meetings. New York: Rand School Press, 1933.
- Social Attitudes Towards War and Peace. New York: Rand School Press, 1934.
- The Blue Eagle is Dead — So What? New York: New York Socialist Party, n.d. [1935].
- A Manual for Trade Union Speakers: A Brief Text Book on Public Speaking. New York: Rand School Press, 1936.
- ABC of Parliamentary Law: A Brief Handbook on Rules of Order for Meetings Adapted to the Needs of Labor Groups. With Rebecca Jarvis. New York: Rand School Press, n.d. [c. 1936]. (Also translated into Japanese).
- What Organized Labor Wants: A Popular Description of Trade Union Philosophy, Economics, and Ideals. New York: Rand School Press, 1937.
- The Democratic Way of Life. New York: Rand School Press, 1940.
- Race Prejudice: A Description of the Various Factors in Racial Animosities, Discriminations, and Conflicts, and the Conditions under which These Antagonisms are Increased or Eliminated. New York: Rand School Press, n.d. [1943].
- Eugene Victor Debs: A Tribute, 1855-1926. New York: Rand School Press, n.d. [1946].
- Didn't We Have Fun! Stories Out of a Long, Fruitful and Merry Life. New York: Rand School Press, 1953.
- Understanding the Worker: Problems of Labor Organizations Analyzed in the Light of Social Psychology. Backgrounds in Trade Union History. New York: Rand School Press, 1954.

== See also ==
- List of New York Legislature members expelled or censured

New York State Assembly
Preceded by Martin Bourke	New York State Assembly; New York County, 17th District; 1918–1920	Succeeded by Nathan Lieberman
Preceded by Murray Felenstein	New York State Assembly; New York County, 17th District; 1922	Succeeded by Meyer Alterman
