= Charles Solomon (politician) =

American politician (1889–1963)

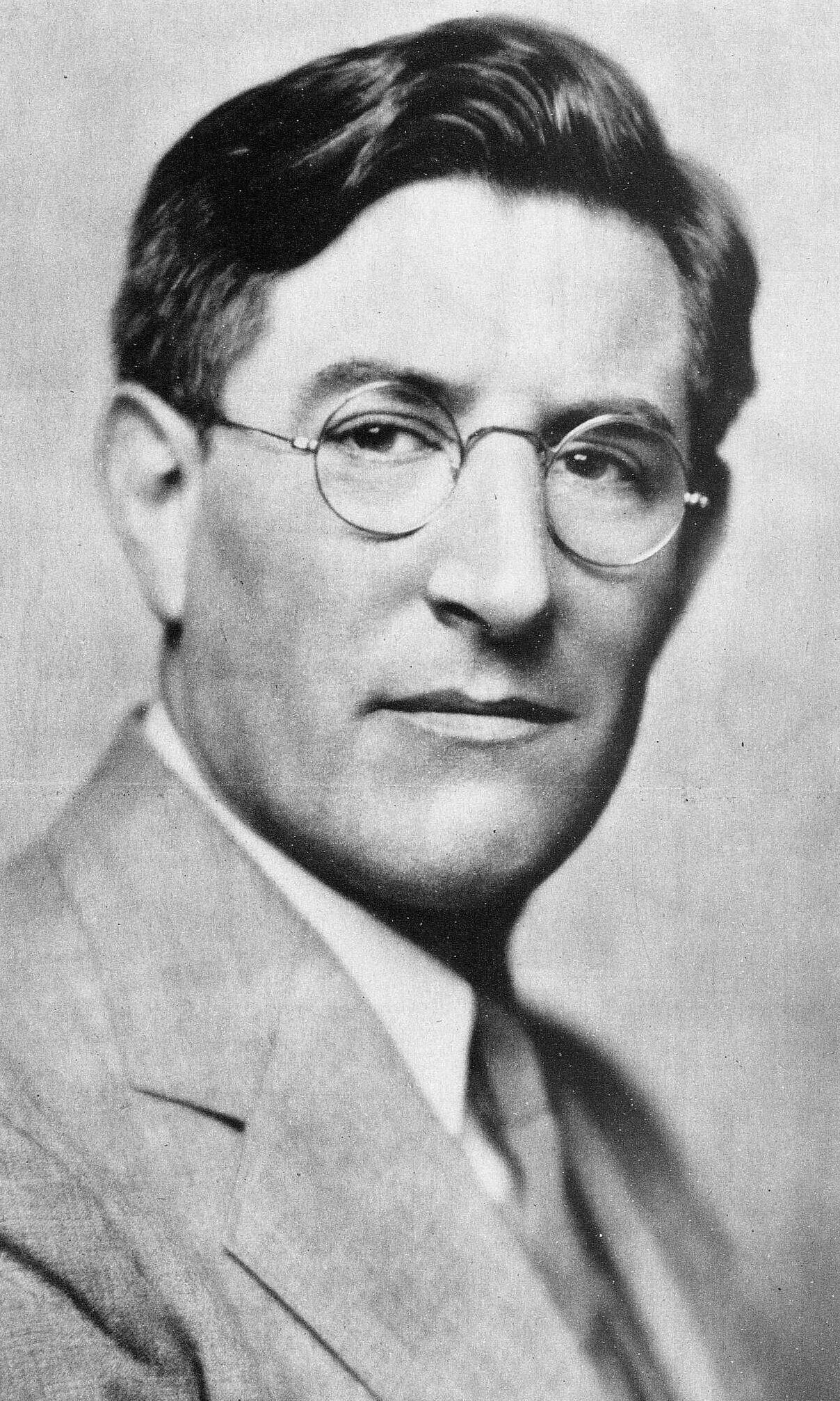
- Solomon c. 1933

New York City Magistrate
- In office December 16, 1935 – December 31, 1959
- Appointed by: Fiorello La Guardia; Vincent R. Impellitteri; Robert F. Wagner Jr.
- Preceded by: Alvah W. Burlingame Jr.

Member of the New York State Assembly from the 23rd Kings district
- In office January 1, 1921 – December 31, 1921
- Preceded by: Himself
- Succeeded by: Joseph F. Ricca
- In office September 16, 1920 – September 21, 1920
- Preceded by: Himself
- Succeeded by: Himself
- In office January 1, 1919 – April 1, 1920
- Preceded by: Abraham I. Shiplacoff
- Succeeded by: Himself

Personal details
- Born: October 29, 1889 New York City, New York, U.S.
- Died: December 8, 1963 (aged 74) New York City, New York, U.S.
- Party: Socialist (before 1936); American Labor (1936–1944); Liberal (after 1944)
- Other political affiliations: Social Democratic Federation (after 1936)
- Spouse: Anna Rosenfield (m. 1911; died 1922)
- Children: 4
- Education: Brooklyn Law School
- Occupation: Lawyer, politician, judge
- Known for: Expulsion from the New York State Assembly

Charles Solomon (October 9, 1889 – December 8, 1963) was an American socialist lawyer, politician and judge from New York City, elected to the New York State Assembly in 1919 and expelled with four of his fellows on the first day of the legislative session, one week after the sensational Palmer Raids. The case of the "Five Socialist Assemblymen" became a cause célèbre of the Red Scare of 1919-20 and its resolution started the process of curbing war hysteria in the United States.

== Biography ==
=== Early years ===
Charles Solomon was born in New York City on October 9, 1889, to Jewish emigrants from the Russian Empire. He worked in the newspaper business and served as a secretary to Socialist Congressman Meyer London.

=== Political career ===
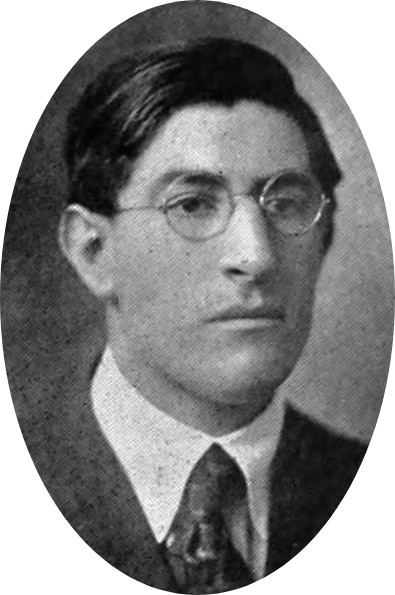
Solomon's official State Assembly portrait, 1919

Solomon was a member of the New York State Assembly in 1919 and 1920, elected in the 23rd District of Kings County which at that time encompassed East New York, Brooklyn.

At the beginning of the session of 1920, Speaker Thaddeus C. Sweet and the Republican majority suspended Solomon and the other four Socialist members (viz. Louis Waldman, Samuel Orr, August Claessens and Sam DeWitt) for alleged disloyalty due to membership in the Socialist Party of America. A lengthy trial before the Judiciary Committee of the Assembly began in the middle of January. Socialist Party leaders Morris Hillquit and Seymour Stedman were in charge of the defense.

During the course of the proceedings, testimony was taken from two New York City policemen who had attempted to stop a crowd of about 2,000 from disrupting a streetcar line in conjunction with a strike in the summer of 1919. According to the published testimony of the officers, on August 6, the two had come across a noisy crowd which had stopped several streetcars by piling debris on the tracks. A near riot erupted when the two plainclothesmen jumped into the fray, one swinging a club and the other punching and kicking. The crowd, for their part, threw rocks and debris at the officers. Assemblyman Solomon, the legislative representative of the district in which the disruption was taking place, was said to have forced his way to the front of the crowd, shouting "Pull the scabs off the cars!" Both officers recognized Solomon and one admonished him for encouraging unlawful behavior and interference. Solomon is said to have moved back into the crowd at this point. Shortly thereafter, reserves arrived and the crowd dispersed and the tracks were cleared.

Such testimony proved damning to the cause of the Socialists. On April 1, the five assemblymen were expelled from the House. All five were re-elected at a special election on September 16, and appeared to take their seats at the beginning of the special session on September 20. The next day, DeWitt and Orr were permitted to take their seats, but Claessens, Solomon and Waldman were expelled again. Protesting against the re-expulsion of their comrades, DeWitt and Orr resigned their seats.

Solomon was re-elected to the Assembly in November 1920, and took his seat in the 144th New York State Legislature in January 1921. He did not stand for re-election that November.

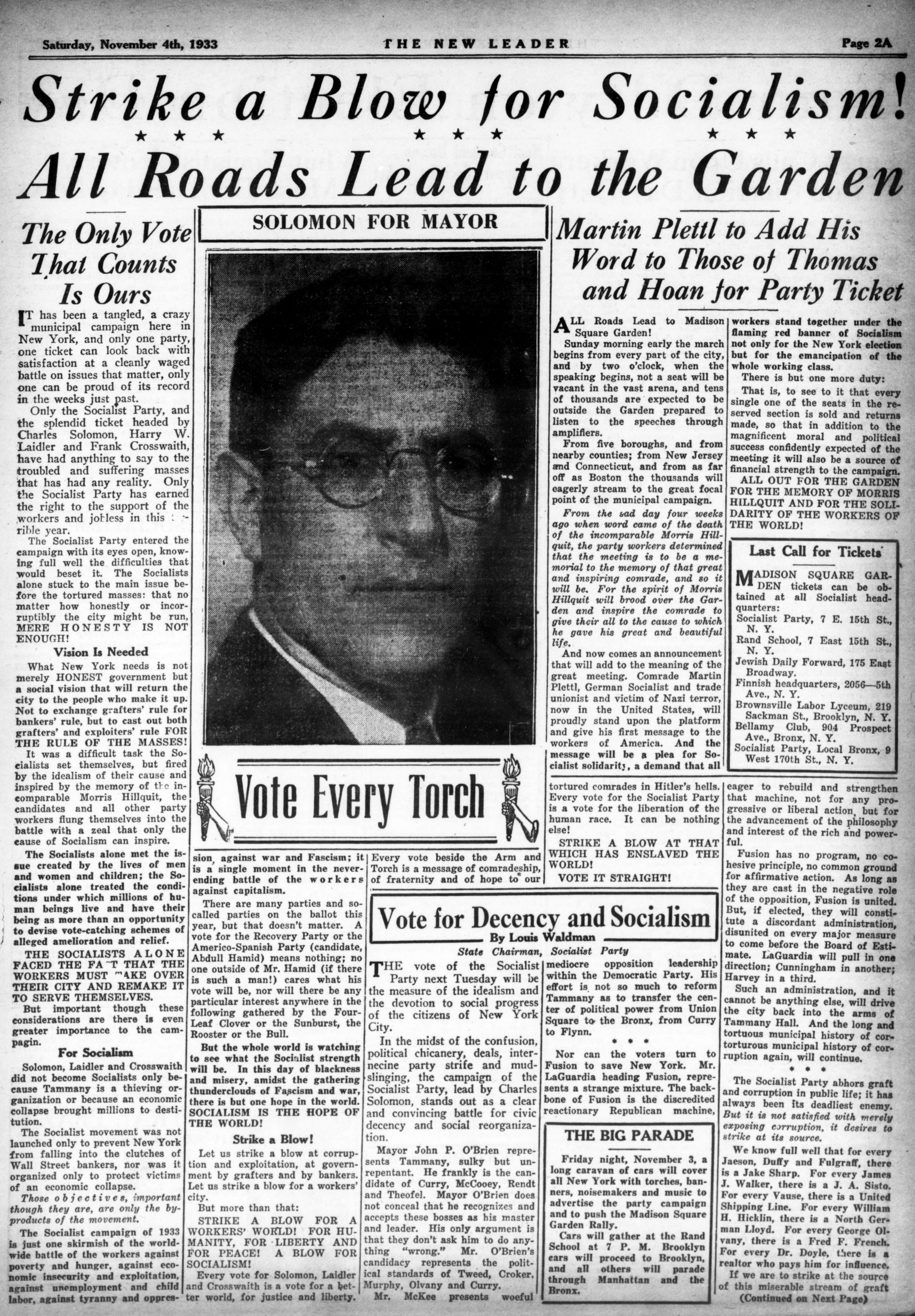
Page from The New Leader advertising Solomon's candidacy in the 1933 New York City mayoral election

Solomon continued to stand as a Socialist candidate for office on many occasions. During the 1920s, he ran for Lieutenant Governor of New York in 1924; for the Assembly again in 1927; and for Justice of the New York Supreme Court in 1928. In the 1930s, he stood for the New York State Senate (8th District) in 1930; for U.S. Senator from New York in 1932; for Mayor of New York City in 1933; and for Governor of New York in 1934. He left the Socialist Party and joined the American Labor Party in 1936, running again for the New York Supreme Court in 1938 and for Kings County District Attorney in 1939. He later co-founded the Liberal Party of New York.

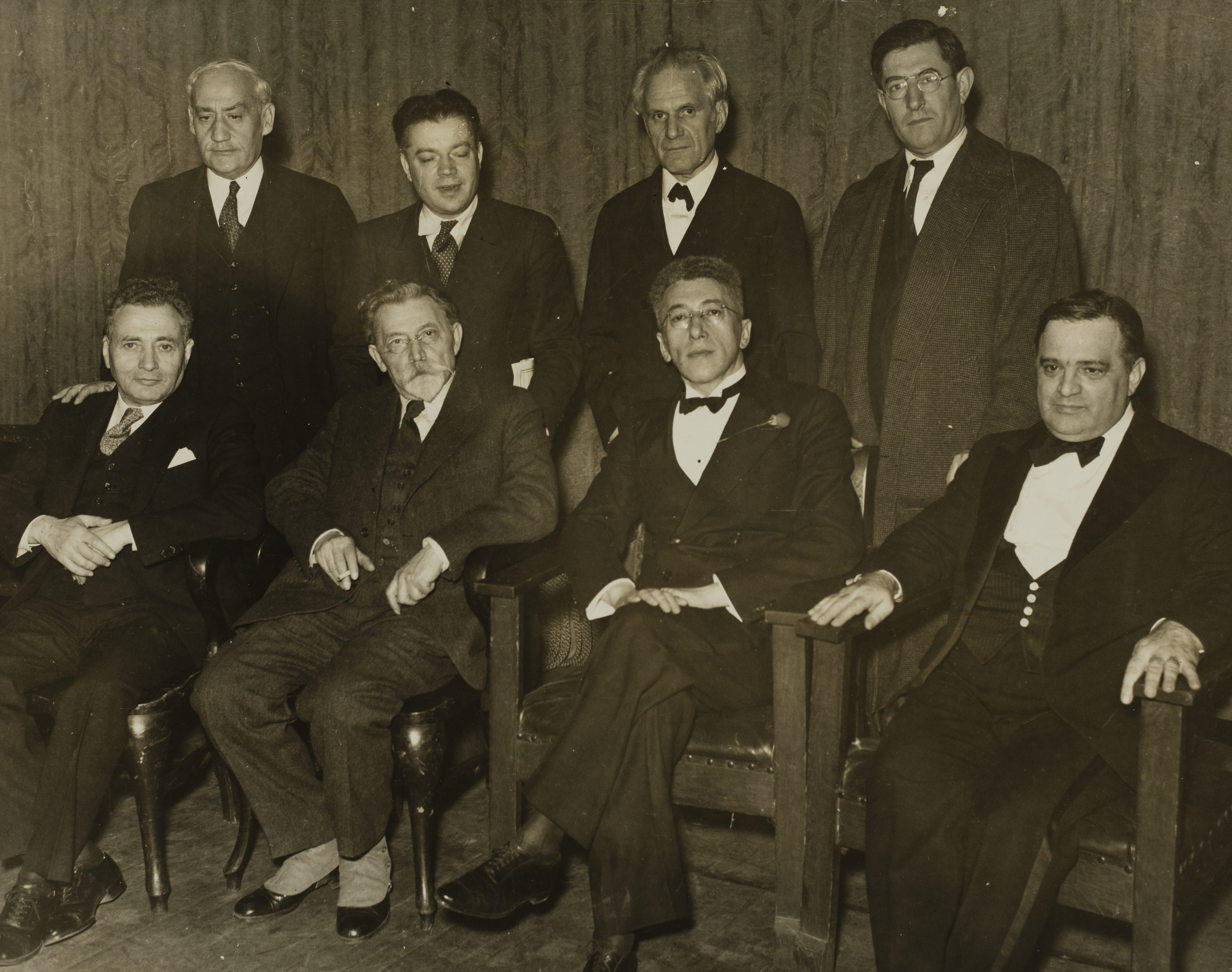
Solomon and several other prominent New York politicos c. 1938. Seated (L-R): Joseph Weinberg, Dr. Chaim Zhitlowsky, Baruch Charney Vladeck, and Fiorello LaGuardia. Standing: Joseph Baskin, David Dubinsky, Judge Jacob Panken, and Judge Charles Solomon.

On December 14, 1935, New York City Mayor Fiorello La Guardia, Solomon's opponent two years prior, appointed him a city magistrate. He was sworn in two days later and held the position for the next 24 years, being reappointed by subsequent mayors Vincent R. Impellitteri and Robert F. Wagner Jr. before retiring at the end of 1959.

Solomon died on December 8, 1963, at the Maimonides Hospital in Brooklyn, New York.

=== Activity in Socialist Party politics ===
Solomon was a social democrat, believing in gradualist ameliorative reform and the use of the ballot box rather than relying upon violent seizure of power. In the 1932-36 party controversy, Solomon stood with the "Old Guard" faction headed by Morris Hillquit, James Oneal, and Louis Waldman.

Following its loss on the floor of the Detroit Convention, the SP's Old Guard took its case to the rank and file of the party, which had been called upon to either approve or defeat the new Declaration of Principles in referendum vote. A Committee for the Preservation of the Socialist Party was established and Solomon was called on to write an agitational pamphlet entitled Detroit and the Party. In this polemical piece, Solomon decried the Detroit Declaration of Principles as "reckless," observing pointedly that "furious phrases cannot take the place of organized mass power." Solomon declared that

"The Declaration does not stand by itself, in a vacuum, as it were. Important as it is, it does not alone account for the vital struggle that is now being waged in the party. It represents the culminating point of a deep seated antagonism. It is like the straw that breaks or threatens to break the camel's back.

"The Declaration of Principles has brought to the surface divergences which are deep, antagonisms which make of our party not a coherent political organization working harmoniously for a common objective but a battle ground of internecine strife."

Solomon charged that the "so-called 'left'" was "making its position clear" with the Declaration of Principles: "There was no mistaking the flag it had unfurled. It was the banner of thinly veiled communism." While he declared that "the Declaration of Principles must be decisively rejected in the referendum," he nevertheless indicated in no uncertain terms that even this would not avert a factional split. "However, that is not enough," he wrote, "The Socialist Party must be made safe for Socialism, for social democracy."

When the resolution passed, the Old Guard immediately set about organizing to lock up the party's New York-based assets under its factional control. The state organization, the Socialist Party of New York, was expelled from the Socialist Party by its governing National Executive Committee in January 1936, and Solomon left with them to help establish the Social Democratic Federation.

== Works ==
- The Socialists in the New York Board of Aldermen: A Record of Six Months' Activity with Evans Clark (1918)
- Detroit and the Party (New York: Committee for the Preservation of Socialist Policies, n.d. [1934])

== See also ==
- List of New York Legislature members expelled or censured

New York State Assembly
Preceded by Abraham I. Shiplacoff	New York State Assembly; Kings County, 23rd District; 1919-1920	Succeeded by Himself
