= Morris D. Reiss =

American lawyer, public servant, and politician

Morris David Reiss

Member of the New York State Assembly
- In office 1921–1921
- Constituency: New York County, 8th District

Assistant United States Attorney
- Incumbent
- Assumed office 1923

Personal details
- Born: c. 1887
- Died: 17 March 1949 Brooklyn, New York, U.S.
- Resting place: Mount Hebron Cemetery
- Party: Republican
- Education: New York Law School
- Occupation: Lawyer, politician

Morris David Reiss (c. 1887 – March 17, 1949) was an American lawyer, public servant, and politician from New York. A graduate of New York Law School, he practised law in Manhattan and was active in settlement work for a decade. Reiss served one term in the New York State Assembly in 1921 as a Republican with Democratic support, representing New York County's 8th District. He later held the position of Assistant United States Attorney.

== Life ==
Reiss was born around 1887. He resided in his Assembly district in New York City since around 1903.

Reiss began attending the New York Law School in 1905. He was admitted to the bar in 1910 and practiced law in his office at 261 Broadway. He was involved in settlement work for ten years. In 1920, he was elected to the New York State Assembly as a Republican with Democratic support in New York County's 8th District, defeating Socialist Louis Waldman. He served in the Assembly in 1921. He lost the 1921 re-election to Democrat Henry O. Kahan. In 1923, he was named Assistant United States Attorney.

Reiss was a member of the New York County Lawyers' Association and the New York County Republican Committee. He was a director, officer, and counsel of the Jewish Home for Convalescents. He also served as its president, and in 1932 he was honored for serving with the Home for eighteen years.

Reiss died from falling or jumping from his room in the Pierrepont Hotel in Brooklyn on March 17, 1949. He was staying in the hotel since his sister, his last surviving relative, died in May 1948. He was buried in Mount Hebron Cemetery.

New York State Assembly
Preceded by Louis Waldman	New York State Assembly; New York County, 8th District; 1921	Succeeded by Henry O. Kahan
