= List of New York State Legislature members expelled or censured =

This page lists members of the New York State Legislature who have: (a) forfeited their seats due to felony convictions or pleas of guilty to felony charges; (b) been expelled from office by votes of their peers; or (c) been censured.

== Legal authority and procedure ==
Under New York Public Officers Law Section 30(1)(e), a member of the State Legislature forfeits his seat upon "his conviction of a felony, or a crime involving a violation of his oath of office".

In People ex rel. McDonald v. Keeler, 99 N.Y. 463, 481 (1885), the New York Court of Appeals held that the New York Constitution, "like many state constitutions, does not explicitly enumerate the 'power to keep order or to punish members or others for disorderly conduct, or to expel a member'". Nevertheless, the Keeler Court added that "'[t]he necessity of the powers mentioned is apparent, and is conceded in all authorities'". Furthermore, Section Three of the New York Legislative Law (adopted in 1892) provides that each house of the state legislature "has the power to expel any of its members, after the report of a committee to inquire into the charges against him shall have been made". Expulsion has not been a common form of sanction used by the Legislature.

In addition to expulsion, other sanctions that the Legislature has used to discipline its own members include censure and removal of privileges (e.g. committee chairships).

The Report of the New York State Senate Select Committee to Investigate the Facts and Circumstances Surrounding the Conviction of Hiram Monserrate on October 15, 2009 contains a lengthy legal analysis of the disciplinary authority of the New York State Senate and the New York State Assembly vis-à-vis their respective members.

== History ==
In 1779, New York State Senator and militia Colonel John Williams was expelled from the Senate during the American Revolution. Williams was accused of filing false muster and payrolls for the militia regiment he commanded in order to profit personally, and of withholding pay from soldiers fined at courts martial that were not sanctioned by militia regulations. (Williams was later exonerated and promoted to Brigadier General. He also served subsequent terms in the Assembly and the Senate, and in the United States Congress.)

In 1861, New York State Assemblymember Jay Gibbons was expelled due to attempts to garner bribes in exchange for his vote.

In 1892, Senators George Z. Erwin, Charles T. Saxton, and Edmund O'Connor were censured by the Senate after they had refused to vote on a specific bill before the legislative body. In 1920, five members of the Assembly were expelled because they were members of the Socialist Party; the Legislature ruled that they could not be "consistent and loyal" due to their allegiances.

In February 2010, Democratic Senator Hiram Monserrate became the first member of the Legislature to be expelled in over 80 years. Monserrate had been convicted of misdemeanor assault in 2009 in connection with acts of domestic violence. Monserrate contested the Senate's action in federal court, but the sanction was upheld.

== List ==
Year	Image	Name	House	Sanction	Political party	Notes
1779	John Williams	John Williams	Senate	Expulsion		Williams was a member of the Senate from the Eastern District during the First Session; he was also a militia Colonel and regimental commander during the American Revolutionary War. He was expelled over accusations of payroll fraud with his regiment and withholding the salaries of his soldiers to pay fines assessed at improper courts-martial. He was later exonerated and promoted to Brigadier General. He also served subsequent terms in the Assembly, Senate and United States Congress.
1781		Ephraim Paine	Senate	Expulsion		Paine was elected in April 1779. He was expelled from the Senate on March 15, 1781, for "neglect of duty".
1861		Jay Gibbons	Assembly	Expulsion	Democrat	Gibbons was arrested on February 17, 1861, on charges of bribery. He was expelled from the Assembly for attempting to acquire bribes in order to vote for certain legislation.
1868		Elijah M. K. Glenn	Assembly	Censure	Republican	On April 9, Glenn accused fellow Assemblyman Alexander Frear of offering him a bribe of $500. On April 10, a select committee appointed to investigate concluded that "the evidence does not furnish any justification for the charges made by Mr. Glenn against Mr. Frear." Thereupon a resolution was passed to censure Glenn. On April 11, Glenn resigned his seat. In November, he was re-elected, and took his seat again in January 1869.
1892	George Z. Erwin	George Z. Erwin	Senate	Censure	Republican	Senators Erwin, Saxton, and O'Connor were held in contempt for refusing to vote on a piece of legislation before the Senate. The three senators were formally censured by the Senate after a Senate Committee ruled the legislative body could censure its members if they caused "an affront to the dignity of the Senate".
1892	Charles T. Saxton	Charles T. Saxton	Senate	Censure	Republican	Senators Erwin, Saxton, and O'Connor were held in contempt for refusing to vote on a piece of legislation before the Senate. The three senators were formally censured by the Senate after a Senate Committee ruled the legislative body could censure its members if they caused "an affront to the dignity of the Senate".
1892	Edmund O'Connor	Edmund O'Connor	Senate	Censure	Republican	Senators Erwin, Saxton, and O'Connor were held in contempt for refusing to vote on a piece of legislation before the Senate. The three senators were formally censured by the Senate after a Senate Committee ruled the legislative body could censure its members if they caused "an affront to the dignity of the Senate".
1913		Stephen J. Stilwell	Senate	Expulsion	Democrat	Stilwell was accused of demanding a bribe and was cleared by a Senate vote of 28 to 21, but lost his seat upon conviction for bribery in the New York Supreme Court.
1920	August Claessens	August Claessens	Assembly	Expulsion	Socialist	See also: 1918-20 New York City rent strikes § 1920 Assemblymembers Claessens, DeWitt, Orr, Solomon, and Waldman were members of the Socialist Party, and were suspended at the beginning of the session by Speaker Thaddeus C. Sweet and the Republican majority. They were expelled on April 1 from the Assembly after a trial before the Assembly Committee on the Judiciary under the premise that they could not be "consistent and loyal" while members of the Socialist Party. All five were re-elected at a special election on September 16, and appeared to take their seats at the special session on September 20. The next day, Claessens, Solomon and Waldman were expelled again. DeWitt and Orr were seated, but resigned in protest against the re-expulsion of their comrades.
1920	Samuel DeWitt	Samuel A. DeWitt	Assembly	Expulsion	Socialist	
1920	Samuel Orr	Samuel Orr	Assembly	Expulsion	Socialist	
1920	Charles Solomon	Charles Solomon	Assembly	Expulsion	Socialist	
1920	Louis Waldman	Louis Waldman	Assembly	Expulsion	Socialist	
1991		Mel Miller	Assembly	Expulsion	Democrat	Speaker Miller lost his seat upon federal conviction for fraud and conspiracy. The conviction was later overturned on appeal.
2007		Mike Cole	Assembly	Censure	Republican	Assemblymember Cole was censured and removed from his position as the ranking member of the Assembly's Committee on Alcoholism and Drug Abuse. The letter of censure from Cole's fellow assembly members cited his violation of a policy which prohibits members of the legislative body from fraternization with interns. The Committee on Ethics and Guidance investigated the incident, and determined that Cole had "brought disfavor on the New York State Assembly and the members thereof".
2008		Diane Gordon	Assembly	Expulsion	Democrat	Forfeited Assembly seat due to felony conviction.
2010	Hiram Monserrate	Hiram Monserrate	Senate	Expulsion	Democrat	Monserrate was convicted of misdemeanor assault in 2009. The Senate voted to expel Monserrate in February 2010. On February 19, 2010, United States federal court Judge William H. Pauley III ruled against Monserrate's bid to have the expulsion blocked. On March 12, 2010, the United States Court of Appeals for the Second Circuit denied Monserrate's appeal of the District Court's decision.
2012		Vito Lopez	Assembly	Censure	Democrat	Lopez was censured by then-Assembly Speaker Sheldon Silver in 2012 for violations of the Assembly's sexual harassment and retaliation policy; he was also stripped of his seniority, banned from having interns, and given a reduced staffing allotment.
2014		Eric Stevenson	Assembly	Expulsion	Democrat	Forfeited Assembly seat due to felony conviction.
2014		William Boyland	Assembly	Expulsion	Democrat	Forfeited Assembly seat due to felony conviction.
2015	Thomas W. Libous	Thomas W. Libous	Senate	Expulsion	Republican	Forfeited Senate seat due to felony conviction. Following his death in 2016, his conviction was vacated.
2015		John Sampson	Senate	Expulsion	Democrat	Forfeited Senate seat due to felony conviction.
2015	Sheldon Silver	Sheldon Silver	Assembly	Expulsion	Democrat	Speaker Silver forfeited his seat upon his initial federal conviction of honest services fraud. Silver's conviction was overturned by the United States Court of Appeals for the Second Circuit on July 13, 2017. In May 2018, he was retried on the same charges and was convicted once again.
2015	Dean Skelos	Dean Skelos	Senate	Expulsion	Republican	Senator Skelos forfeited his seat upon his conviction for corruption. His son was convicted on related charges. The conviction was overturned on appeal in September 2017. In July 2018, Skelos was again convicted following a retrial.

== See also ==
- First Red Scare
- List of members of the New York State Assembly
- List of New York state senators
- List of United States senators expelled or censured
- Majority Leader of the New York State Senate
- Politics of New York (state)
- Socialist Party of America
