= Samuel Orr =

American politician

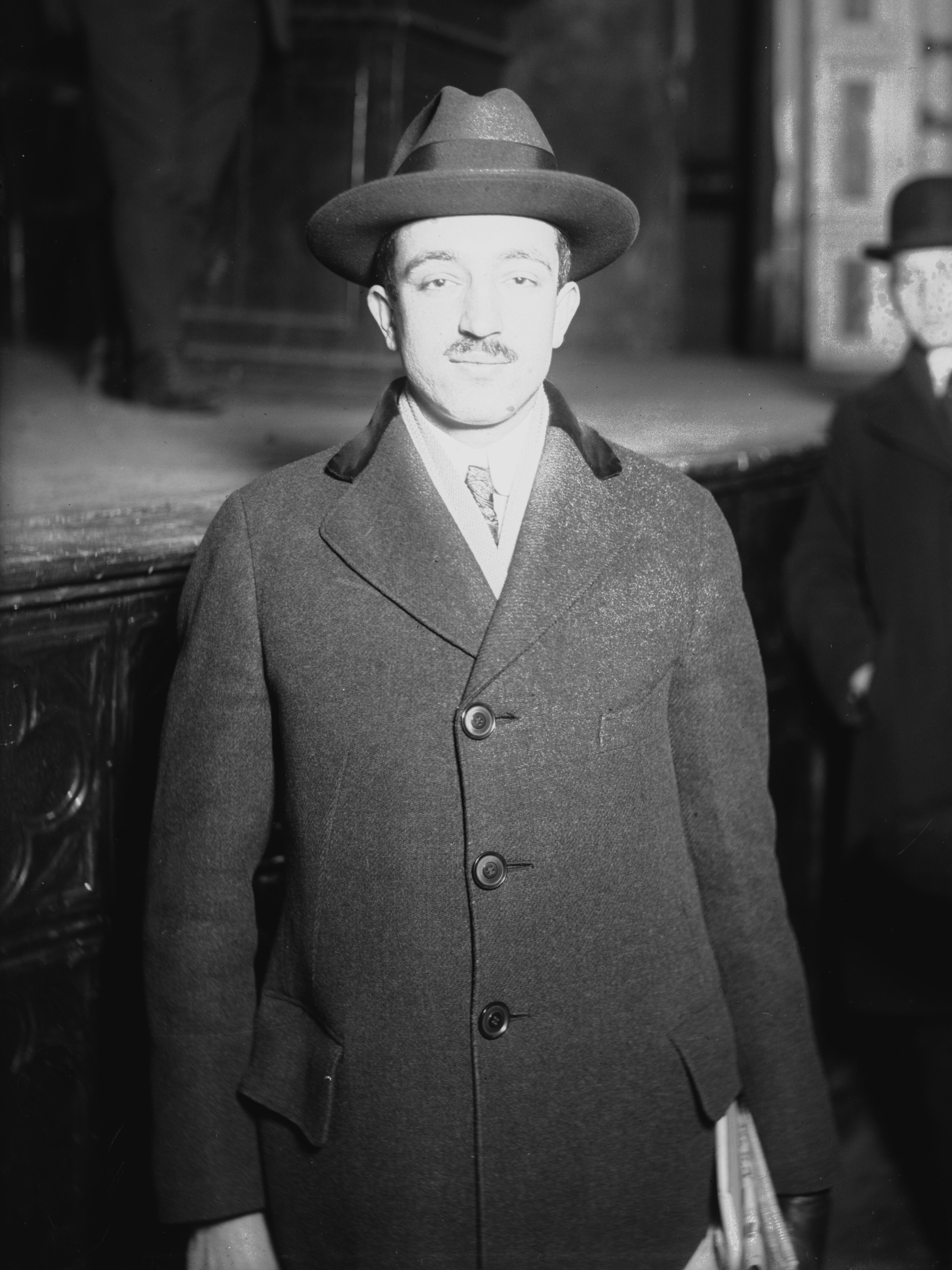
- Orr in 1920

New York City Magistrate
- In office January 1, 1942 – June 30, 1952
- Appointed by: Fiorello La Guardia
- Succeeded by: Nicholas F. Delagi

Special Deputy New York City Comptroller
- In office January 1, 1938 – December 31, 1941
- Appointed by: Joseph McGoldrick
- Succeeded by: George Marlin

Member of the New York State Assembly from the 4th Bronx district
- In office January 1, 1921 – December 31, 1921
- Preceded by: Himself
- Succeeded by: Louis A. Schoffel
- In office September 16, 1920 – September 21, 1920
- Preceded by: Himself
- Succeeded by: Himself
- In office January 1, 1920 – April 1, 1920
- Preceded by: M. Maldwin Fertig
- Succeeded by: Himself
- In office January 1, 1918 – December 31, 1918
- Preceded by: Constituency established
- Succeeded by: M. Maldwin Fertig

Personal details
- Born: July 11, 1890 Rajgród, Congress Poland, Russian Empire
- Died: August 29, 1981 (aged 91) New York City, New York, U.S.
- Party: Socialist (before 1936); American Labor (1936–1944); Liberal (after 1944); Democratic (1960s)
- Education: New York University School of Law
- Occupation: Lawyer, politician, judge
- Known for: Expulsion from the New York State Assembly

Samuel Orr (July 11, 1890 – August 29, 1981) was a Polish-American socialist politician from New York City best remembered for being one of the five elected members of the Socialist Party of America expelled by the New York State Assembly during the First Red Scare in 1920.

== Biography ==
=== Early years ===
Orr was born on July 11, 1890, in the town of Rajgród, then a part of Russian-occupied Poland. His family moved to the United States in 1891. Orr graduated from the New York University School of Law and practiced law, including time at the firm of Benjamin N. Cardozo and Nathan Bijur.

=== Political career ===
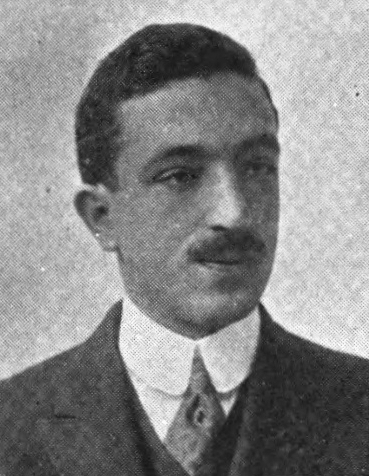
Orr's official State Assembly portrait, 1918

In November 1917, Orr was elected on the Socialist ticket to the New York State Assembly (Bronx Co., 4th D.), and sat in the 141st New York State Legislature, being one of 10 members of the Socialist Party which were elected to the Assembly of 1918, the high-water mark of the party's fortunes in the state.

In November 1919, Orr was re-elected to the Assembly, but on the first day of the session of the 143rd New York State Legislature he was called before the Speaker along with four of his Socialist colleagues — Louis Waldman, Charles Solomon, Samuel A. DeWitt, and August Claessens. The five were charged with being unfit for membership in the Assembly through their membership in the Socialist Party and were suspended from their seats by a vote of 140 to 6.

A protracted political trial before the Assembly Committee on the Judiciary followed to determine the fitness of the five Socialists to take their seats, which ran throughout the winter and spring. The so-called "trial" began on January 20, 1920. Morris Hillquit and Seymour Stedman were the lead attorneys in handling the case for the Socialist defendants. The group was formally expelled on April 1, 1920. All five were re-elected at a special election on September 16, and appeared to take their seats at the beginning of the special session on September 20. The next day, Orr and DeWitt were permitted to take their seats, but Claessens, Solomon and Waldman were expelled again. Protesting against the re-expulsion of their comrades, DeWitt and Orr resigned their seats.

Samuel Orr was re-elected to the State Assembly in November 1920, and took his seat in the 144th New York State Legislature for the session of 1921.

In 1922, Orr ran in the 22nd District for the New York State Senate, but lost. He ran again in 1928 in the same district, without success. In 1933, he ran in the 21st District, and lost once again.

Orr ran for Congress in New York's 23rd congressional district in 1926, 1930 and 1934 on the Socialist ticket, but lost each time. He was once again a candidate in 1938 on the American Labor Party ticket, but was ultimately replaced for the nomination.

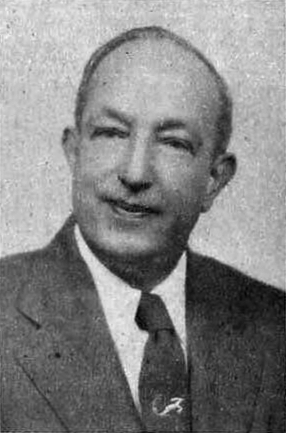
Orr c. 1953

Orr was appointed Special Deputy New York City Comptroller in 1938, serving through 1941. He was appointed a city magistrate by Mayor Fiorello La Guardia in 1942, serving for 10 years until his retirement. He was an unsuccessful candidate for Bronx County Judge in 1943.

Orr was the Liberal candidate for Bronx County Judge in 1953, coming in second place with 25% of the vote, and for Bronx County District Attorney in 1955, coming in third place with 13% of the vote.

In 1962, Orr was appointed chairman of the Senior Citizens Committee of the New York State Democratic Campaign Committee ahead of that year's elections.

=== Death and legacy ===
Samuel Orr died at Montefiore Hospital in the Bronx on August 29, 1981.

== See also ==
- List of New York Legislature members expelled or censured

== Footnotes ==
New York State Assembly
Preceded by new district	New York State Assembly; Bronx County, 4th District; 1918	Succeeded by M. Maldwin Fertig
Preceded by M. Maldwin Fertig	New York State Assembly; Bronx County, 4th District; 1920–1921	Succeeded by Louis A. Schoffel
