= Devere Allen =

American journalist (1891–1955)

Devere Allen as he appeared in March 1937, at the time of the national convention of the Socialist Party of America.

Devere Allen (1891–1955) was an American socialist and pacifist political activist and journalist. Allen is best remembered as the main editor of The World Tomorrow following the departure of Norman Thomas from the magazine in 1922. Allen was the author of more than 20 books and pamphlets and was active in the leadership of several political organizations, including the League for Independent Political Action (1928–1932) and the Socialist Party of America.

== Biography ==
=== Early years ===
Devere Allen was born June 24, 1891, in Providence, Rhode Island. He attended elementary school in several New England towns, including Providence, Westerly, Rhode Island, and New London, Connecticut, before being enrolled in the Wheeler School, still located in North Stonington, Connecticut.

During his younger years, Allen worked variously as a farmhand, a retail clerk, a restaurant waiter, and a school teacher.

Allen continued his education at Oberlin College, a private liberal arts university located in Oberlin, Ohio, from which he graduated in 1917 with a bachelor's degree. Allen's graduation came just two months after American entry into World War I, to which he objected on religious and ethical grounds. In response, he joined the pacifist Fellowship of Reconciliation (FoR), which had been established in the United States in 1915. Allen soon became a key leader of this organization, with which he would remain affiliated throughout his life.

=== Journalism ===
In 1918, Allen became involved in a left-wing youth organization in New York City called Young Democracy. He served as Executive Secretary of that organization from 1918 until 1919 and edited the group's monthly periodical, the eponymous Young Democracy, from 1919 through 1921.

The Fellowship of Reconciliation published an official monthly magazine in New York City, The World Tomorrow, which founding editor Rev. Norman Thomas had soon made into a leading voice of ethical socialism in the United States. In 1922, Thomas left the magazine and Allen took over his seat in the editor's chair. He would remain the editor of the publication until its termination in 1934.

Following the shutting of The World Tomorrow, Allen moved over to The Nation, where he was made an associate editor.

In 1933, Allen and his wife established the No-Frontier News Service, an agency which provided socialist and anti-militarist content to left-wing newspapers and magazines. This service was continued forward as World-Over Press, which provided international news reportage and commentary to mainstream periodicals around the world. At the time of Allen's death World-Over Press counted more than 700 subscribers in its ranks.

=== Political activism ===
Allen was extremely active politically throughout his life. In addition to his efforts on behalf of the Fellowship of Reconciliation, Allen was a member of the Socialist Party of America and a leading figure in the League for Independent Political Action, which attempted from 1928 to 1932 to establish a mass social democratic political movement outside the Socialist Party. Allen was also active in the League for Industrial Democracy, a non-party socialist group, as well as the pacifist War Resisters League.

Allen was also a member of several focused single interest groups, including the anti-imperialist American League for India's Freedom and the anti-fascist League Against German Fascism.

A prolific author, Allen published his best-known book, A Fight for Peace, in 1930. In it, Allen surveyed the history of the American peace movement and advocated three types of non-violent action by which pacifists could effectively fight oppression without violence: non-cooperation with aggressors, non-violent "attack" to pursue social objectives, and mass non-violent direct action to prevent war.

Electoral politics also attracted Allen's attention. In 1932 he was the candidate of the Socialist Party for United States Senate from his home state of Connecticut. Allen headed the state Socialist ticket in 1936 as the party's candidate for Governor of Connecticut. A final political run came in 1954, when Allen again stood as the Socialist candidate for U.S. Senator from Connecticut.

During the heated factional politics which swept the Socialist Party during the decade of the 1930s, Allen emerged as a close factional ally of Norman Thomas and active member of the Militant faction. Allen was the primary author of the 1934 Declaration of Principles, a fundamental document of Socialist Party history which later proved to be the fulcrum for a split of the rival Old Guard faction to form a rival organization called the Social Democratic Federation. In 1936 Allen attempted to unseat the Mayor of Bridgeport Jasper McLevy, an Old Guard stalwart, as head of the Socialist Party of Connecticut — an effort which failed.

Following the expulsion of a Trotskyist left wing from the Socialist Party in 1937, Allen was made a member of the governing National Executive Committee of the Socialist Party. Allen was returned to that position by the 1938 National Convention of the SPA, serving a two-year term.

=== Later years ===
During World War II Allen remained consistent with his pacifist ideals, opposing American entry into the war as a morally indefensible means of defeating fascism.

Allen later taught in Williamstown, Massachusetts, at the Williamstown Institute of Politics and the Wellesley Summer Institute for Social Progress.

=== Death and legacy ===
Devere Allen died on August 27, 1955, in Westerly, Rhode Island.

Allen's papers comprise part of the Peace Collection at Swarthmore College, located in Swarthmore, Pennsylvania. The substantial holding, totaling some 80 linear feet of material, was donated to the school in 1961 and is available to be freely used by interested scholars.

== Works ==
- A War-Time Credo. [Oberlin, OH]: Oberlin Fellowship of Reconciliation, n.d. [c. 1918].
- War Resistance as War Prevention. New York City: Fellowship of Reconciliation, n.d. [c. 1928].
- Pacifism in the Modern World. Garden City, NY: Doubleday, Doran & Co., 1929.
- The Fight for Peace. New York: Macmillan, 1930.
- "Killdeer in Connecticut," The Auk, vol. 47, no. 4 (Oct. 1930), pg. 561.
- Will Socialism End the Evil of War? Girard, KS: Haldeman-Julius Publishing Co., 1931.
- Adventurous Americans. New York: Farrar and Rinehart, 1932.
- A Survey of the Parties, 1932. New York: The World Tomorrow, 1932.
- "Wintering or Early Arrival of the Great Blue Heron in Connecticut," The Auk, vol. 49, no. 3 (July 1932), pg. 342.
- "The World's Stake in Austria," North American Review, vol. 236 no. 3 (Sept. 1933), pp. 231–237.
- "Pine Grosbeak Nesting in Connecticut," The Auk, vol. 50, no. 4 (Oct. 1933), pp. 442–443.
- "The Peace Movement Moves Left," Annals of the American Academy of Political and Social Science, vol. 175 (Sept.1934), pp. 150–155.
- "Socialism: Gateway to Democracy," Annals of the American Academy of Political and Social Science, vol. 180 (July 1935), pp. 74–82. In JSTOR
- Justice Triumphs in Spain: A Letter About the Trial of the POUM. With Norman Thomas. New York: Socialist Party of the United States, n.d. [1938].
- How to Meet Totalitarianism: Excerpts from Address, May 20, 1939. New York: War Resisters League, 1939.
- What Next? London: Friends' Peace Committee, n.d. [1940].
- The Caribbean: Laboratory of World Cooperation. New York City: League for Industrial Democracy, 1943.
- "Cultural Missions Bringing Light to Mexican Masses," Hispania, vol. 27, no. 1 (Feb. 1944), pp. 69–70.
- Non-Violence Goes Latin. London: Peace News, 1945.
- What Europe Thinks About America. Hinsdale, IL: Henry Regnery Co., 1948.
- Above All Nations: An Anthology. Edited with George Edward Gordon Catlin. New York: Harper, 1949.
