= Old Guard faction =

1919–1935 faction of the Socialist Party of America

- Successor: Social Democratic Federation (U.S.)
- Formation: 1919
- Dissolved: 1935
- Key people: Louis Waldman, Morris Hillquit, James Oneal
- Main organ: The Call
- Parent organization: Socialist Party of America

The Old Guard faction was an organized group in the Socialist Party of America (SPA) that sought to retain the organization's traditional orientation towards electoral politics by fighting the Militant faction of generally-younger party members who factionally organized to promote greater efforts at direct action in advancing the cause of revolutionary socialism.

The Old Guard had its roots as the "Regulars" in the inner party factional war of 1919, which resulted in the fragmentation of the Socialist Party into the Communist Party of America and Communist Labor Party of America. In 1935, the personal and political friction between the Old Guard and the Militants (and their "Progressive" allies) led to an organizational split, with the Old Guard faction leaving to establish the Social Democratic Federation (SDF).

== History ==
=== Formation of the Old Guard faction ===
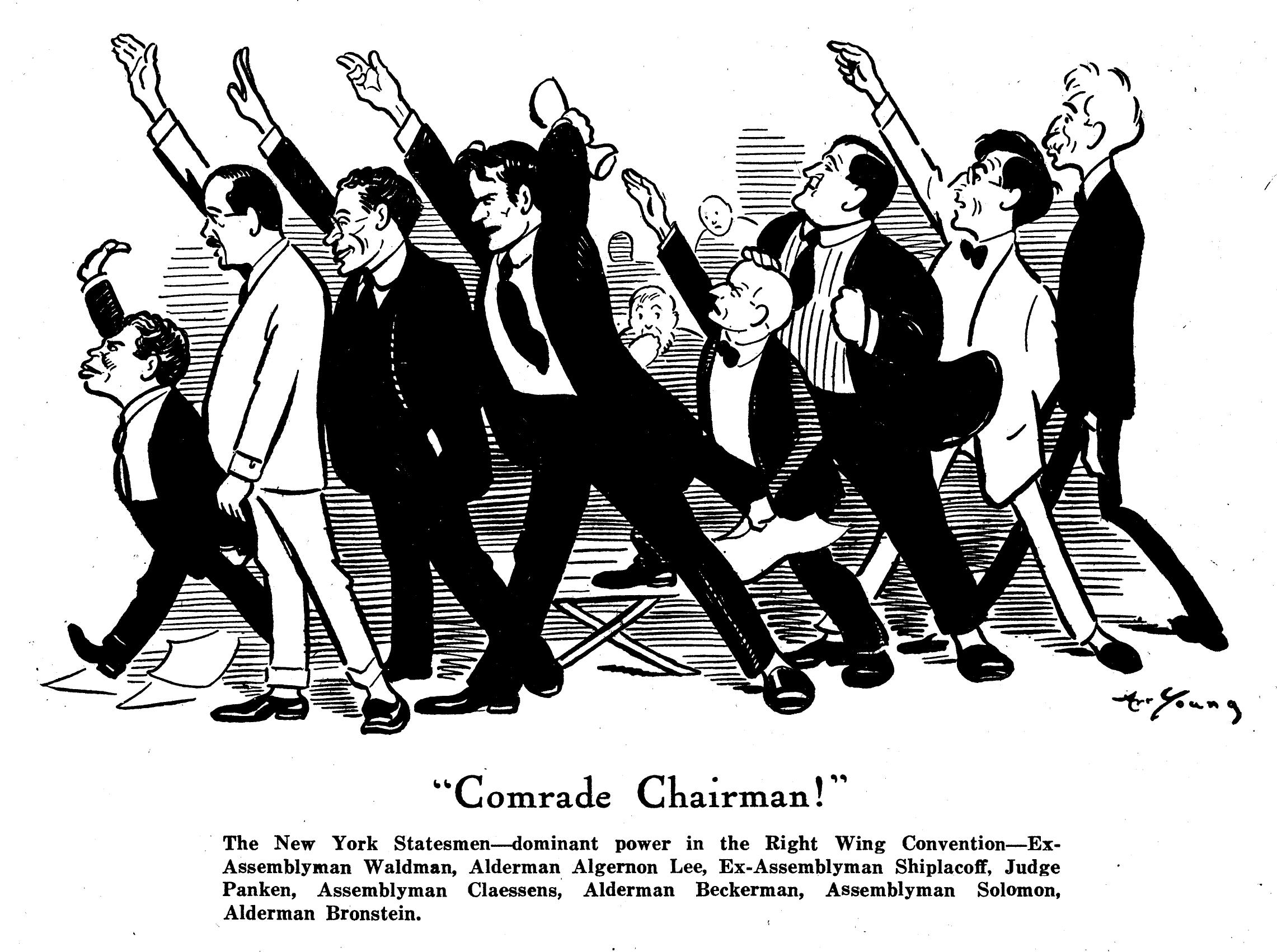
"Comrade Chairman!" Cartoon by Art Young depicting the New York Old Guard at the 1919 Emergency National Convention of the SPA. Left to right: Louis Waldman, Algernon Lee, Abraham Shiplacoff, Jacob Panken, August Claessens, Abraham Beckerman, Charles Solomon, and Alexander Braunstein.

The Old Guard and their Militant foes both hailed from the broad Marxist tradition, the former seeing democracy as a positive value in itself and emphasizing the efficacy of the electoral road to power while the latter tended to see democracy as a sort of chimera, a tactical expedient propagated by the bourgeois in its maintenance of class power. Beyond this important analytical difference, the divide between these two factional groupings was largely generational, with the Old Guard dominated by middle aged party veterans of large standing while newcomers into the Socialist Party during the Depression years of the early 1930s tended to gravitate as a younger and more aggressive caucus.

Historian Irving Howe, himself a young Militant in the SP in the early 1930s, later recalled his own perception of the "Old Guard":

On the right stood the Old Guard, hard and unyielding. As a youthful newcomer to the socialist movement, I was of course contemptuous of the Old Guard, and so was almost every other new member. ... In the American left of those days anything not 'revolutionary' was dismissed as beneath discussion; but that didn't bother the Old Guard, which gloried in its distance from the vulgar ferment of popular radicalism. Perhaps the Old Guard carried within itself too large a weight of historical pain — its admirers would say, historical knowledge. It had won the struggle against the communists in the garment unions during the 1920s, but that had drained much of its socialist spirit. It made of its very moderation a mannerism of excess. With a principled sort of grouchiness, it seemed almost intent upon showing that sectarianism can be found anywhere along the socialist spectrum.

=== Split of the Old Guard ===
In March 1935 the combined Progressives and Militants of the Socialist Party launched a new weekly newspaper in New York City to supplant the Old Guard-dominated The New Leader — The Socialist Call. The Managing Editor of the new 12-page publication was Bruno Fischer, with Miliitant stalwart Jack Altman acting as Business Manager. The paper took direct aim at the Old Guard from the outset in declaring itself to be "the organ of revolutionary socialism":

Revolutionary socialism aims at nothing less than the transfer of power to the working class. This, and this alone, can save the workers from tyranny and starvation, from wage-slavery and war. ...

As capitalism decays it is preparing to rivet upon the workers its open dictatorship. It is preparing to destroy even those feeble democratic institutions that it has so far allowed to exist. ...

Journals calling themselves 'Socialist' have failed in that they have confused socialism with reform. They have in recent years lived in eternal fear of offending labor leaders, and have therefore kept silent in the face of reaction and racketeering within the unions. In doing so they have damaged the reputation of the Socialist movement, and have lent aid and comfort to the enemies of labor. They have failed to distinguish between the 'liberalism' of Roosevelt and revolutionary socialism. There is need of a Socialist organ that can differentiate between reforms for the preservation of capitalism, and socialism.

SPA National Chairman Leo Krzycki sent the new publication his warm greetings at the time of its launch, although beseeching it to "steer clear of party controversy." The participation of Norman Thomas was even more direct, as he launched a regular weekly column in the pages of The Socialist Call, a piece called "At the Front."

== See also ==
- 1934 Declaration of Principles
- Social Democratic Federation (U.S.)
