= Jack Altman =

Socialist Party politician

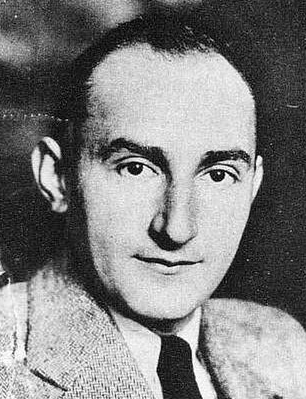
Altman c. 1934

Jack Altman (November 20, 1906 – January 29, 1959) was an English-American Socialist Party politician.

== Early life ==
Altman was born in London, England, attending the Stepney Jewish School and Whitechapel Foundation School. He joined the Guild of Youth, the youth section of the Labour Party, at 14, and the regular party at 16. He came to the United States at 19, attending the Rand School of Social Science and the Brookwood Labor College.

== Career ==
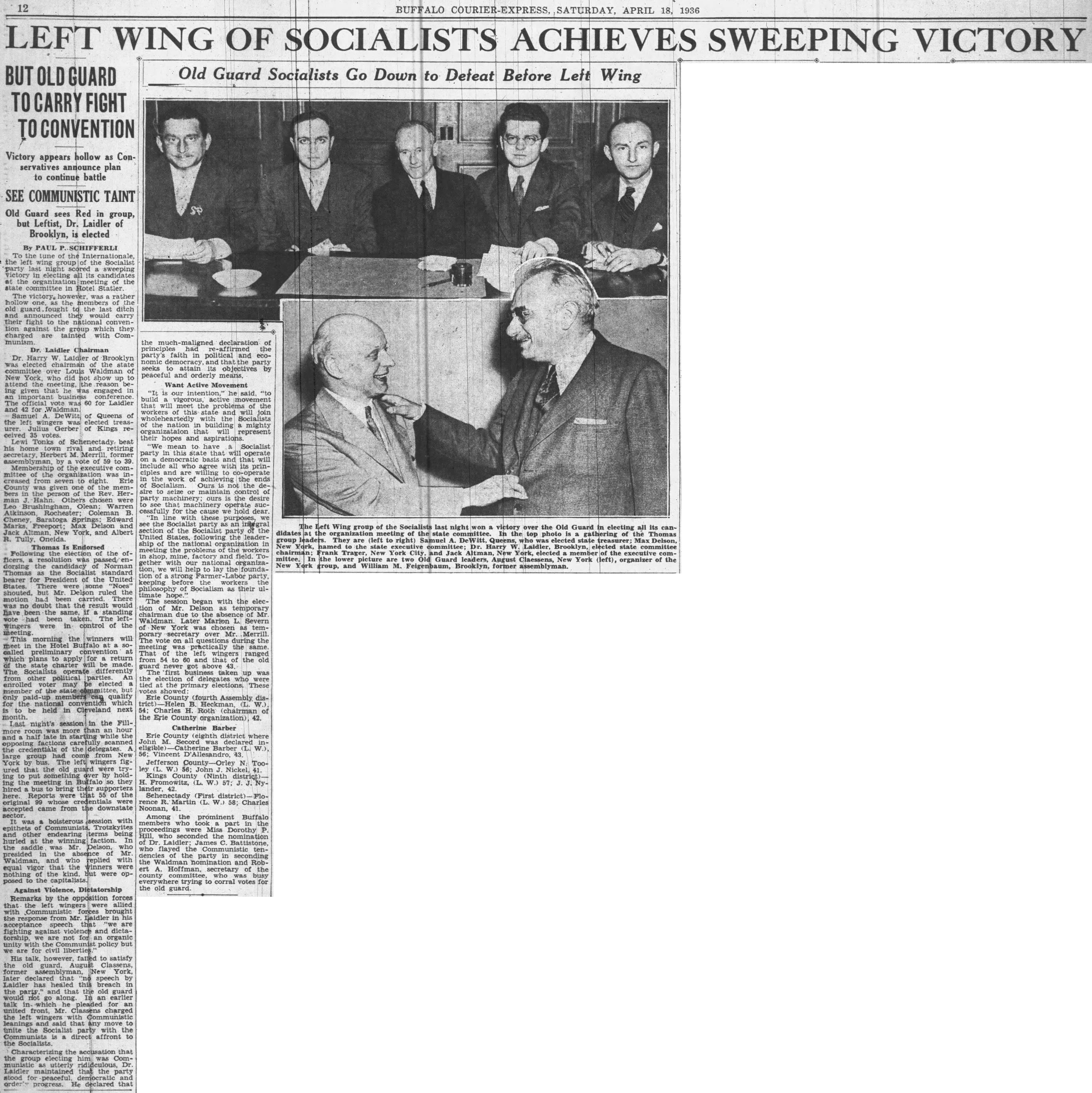
An article in the Buffalo Courier-Express detailing the victory of the Militant faction in gaining control of the Socialist Party of New York, April 18, 1936. Altman is on the far right in the top picture.

Altman served as the Executive Secretary of the Socialist Party of New York City. Altman was a member of the Militant wing of the Socialist Party, wanting to preserve the Party's Social-Democratic character while adopting more vigorous tactics. Before the 1932 Socialist Party Convention in Milwaukee, Altman issued a pamphlet with Devere Allen and Upton Sinclair, opposing reformism in the Socialist Party. Altman was arrested in 1934 under a 1919 law that made it a misdemeanor to display a red flag in public. His conviction was later reversed by the Appellate Division of the Supreme Court.

Altman participated in 1936 talks with Earl Browder and Jack Stachel discussing the possibility of collaboration between the Communist Party and the Socialist Party. After the 1936 election, Altman expressed interest in collaboration between the Socialist Party and the American Labor Party. This placed Altman and the Militants in opposition to the Clarity Caucus within the Socialist Party, which opposed working with the ALP.

Altman was responsible for the expulsion of the Trotskyist faction from the New York Socialist Party in 1937, which resulted in half of the Young People's Socialist League leaving the SP to join the new Socialist Workers Party. Altman argued that the Trotskyists had attempted to undermine the Socialist Party and had not followed the Party's directives.

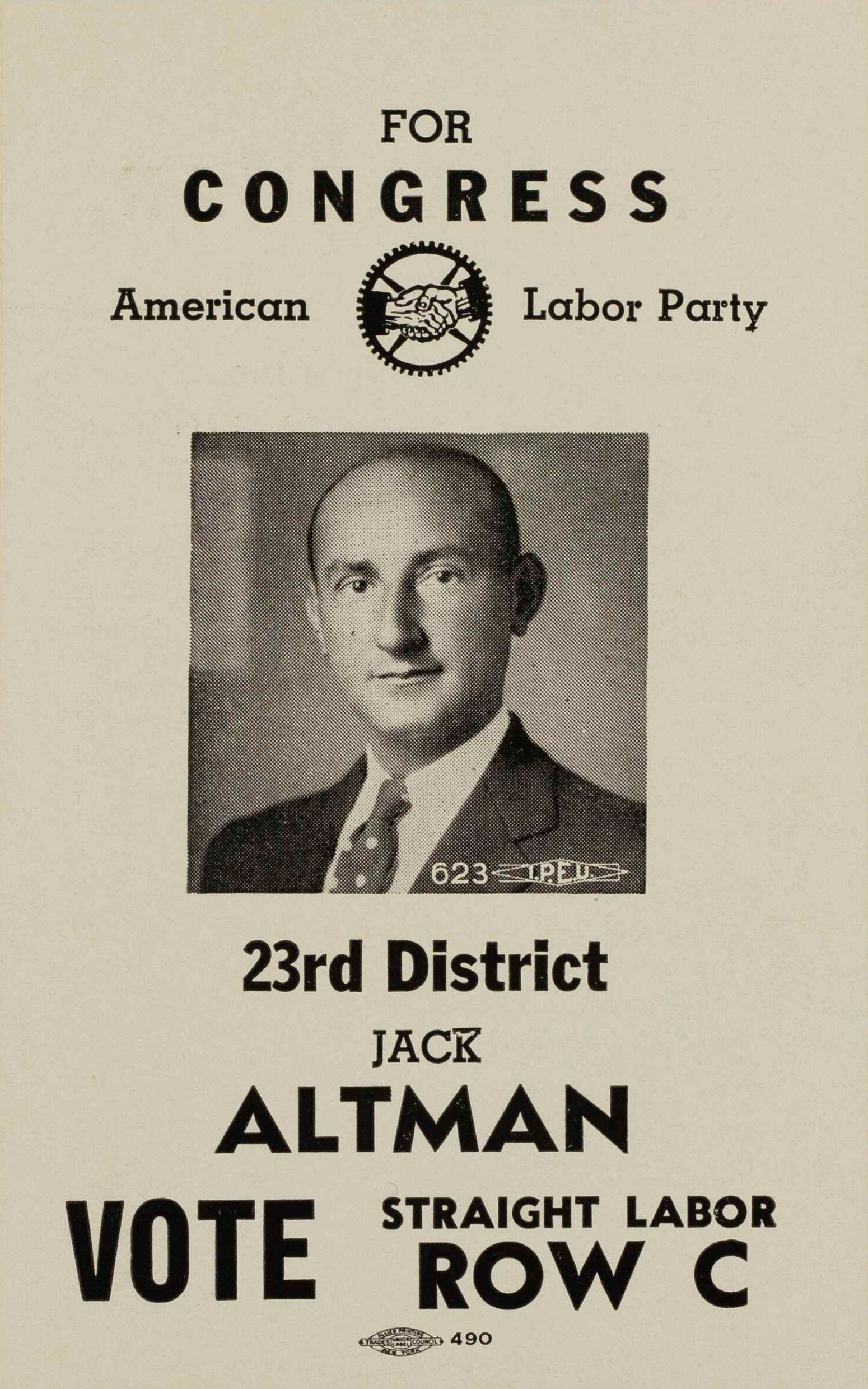
Card from Altman's 1940 campaign for New York's 23rd congressional district

Altman was a frequent candidate for public office, running for New York State Assembly in 1931, 1932, and 1934, for Manhattan Borough President in 1937, and for Congress in New York's 10th district in 1938, all under the Socialist Party ticket. He later joined the American Labor Party, standing as its candidate for Congress in the 23rd district in 1940 and for New York State Senate in 1942. In his last race, he received over 25% of the vote.

Altman worked as an organizer for the Retail, Wholesale and Department Store Union between 1942 and 1953. Altman was a member of the provisional committee of the Union for Democratic Action. He was also active in the American Council for Judaism, serving on its national board.

== Death ==
As reported in the New York Times of January 30, 1959, "Jack Altman, former chairman of the New York City Socialist Party, and a labor relations and insurance consultant" died of a heart attack on Jan 29, 1959 at the age of 53.

According to the article, Altman collapsed as he drove to his office. A brother-in-law, Leonard Lurie who was seated next to Mr. Altman, managed to stop the car.

Altman was survived his widow, Diana, and two sons, Stephen and Gregory.
