= Militant faction =

American Marxist group

- Clarity, launched in March 1937, was the organ of the so-called "Clarity caucus" of the Socialist Party's Militant faction.
- Leader: Devere Allen
- Key people: Norman Thomas
- Parent organization: Socialist Party of America

The Militant faction was an organized grouping of Marxists in the Socialist Party of America (SPA) who sought to steer that organization from its orientation towards electoral politics and towards direct action and revolutionary socialism. The faction emerged during 1930 and 1931 and achieved practical control of the organization in 1934. The existence of the "Militants" and the threat they represented to the political line of the SPA caused traditional electorally oriented members to form an organized grouping of their own, known as the "Old Guard faction." In 1935 the personal and political friction between these two basic tendencies lead to an organizational split, with the Old Guard faction leaving to establish the Social Democratic Federation (SDF). The Militant faction itself shattered in the aftermath of the 1935 party split with only a small core loyal to perennial Presidential candidate Norman Thomas remaining in the organization by the coming of World War II.

== History ==
=== State of the Socialist Party in the late 1920s ===
The 1919 Emergency National Convention of the Socialist Party of America saw the departure of the proto-communist Left Wing Section, leaving control of the party's name, emblems, and assets in the hand of the Regular faction headed by Adolph Germer, James Oneal, and Morris Hillquit. The victory proved to be Pyrrhic, with tens of thousands of members suspended or expelled by the National Executive Committee. An entire generation of the organization's most energetic young activists departed to join the ranks of the fledgling Communist Party of America and Communist Labor Party of America. Socialist Party membership plummeted from a peak of over 104,000 paid members in April 1919 to fewer than 9,000 in the first quarter of 1928.

Moreover, the party was nearly insolvent: its coffers empty, printing bill unpaid, and the organization nearly two years in arrears in the payment of its dues to the Labor and Socialist International in Switzerland.

=== Formation of the Militant faction ===
Even though the Militant faction emerged as a coherent unit in the Socialist Party late in 1930 and congealed in 1931, as early as 1926 observers were noting evidence of a fissure. Communist Party member Bertram D. Wolfe wrote in a September 1926 article tellingly entitled "The Socialist Party Furnishes Its 'Insurgents'":

"For some time there has been growing discontent manifested within the ranks of New York Socialists, especially among the younger elements, against the methods used by the [Jewish Daily] Forward crowd in fighting the Communists, in opposing the united front proposals of the Workers (Communist) Party, in splitting unions and other labor organizations and expelling progressive and left wing elements, in using gangsterism — in short, in all the methods employed by the old socialist leadership to ruin the labor movement that they can no longer rule. * * *

"Even a small section of the leadership, such men as Norman Thomas, have been criticizing these policies ... because they are causing a further loss of membership and a further disintegration of the Socialist Party.

"The New Leader is a strange paper. In one column, Norman Thomas, who apparently gets complete charge of that column in order to 'keep him quiet,' writes with fairness as fairness is understood by a Socialist tinged with liberalism and pacifism and prejudiced against the uncompromising forms of struggle which the Communists advocate, and in the rest of the paper every conceivable sort of lie and slander is written about these same Communists."

Historian of the Socialist Party David A. Shannon noted that the "radical doctrinaire Marxists" of the Militant faction differed in orientation and emphasis from their factional opponents:

"The Militants were numerically a small group, but they were an extremely vocal one. Philosophically the Militants were Marxists, as were their Old Guard opposition. But the Militants leaned much further toward Marxism as developed by Lenin than did the Old Guard, whose favorite theoreticians were Karl Kautsky and Hillquit. Yet the Militants were not Communists. They were opposed to the rigid discipline of the Third International, and they were critical of the Soviet Union's denial of civil liberties, just as were Old Guard Socialists. In many respects the ideological differences between the Old Guard and the Militants were differences of emphasis. * * *

"One important difference between the Militants and their Old Guard opponents was their viewpoints on democracy. The Old Guard was composed of convinced democrats who held that socialism would advance democracy and come to America only by democratic means. The Militants' view toward democracy was in some respects similar to that of the Communists. Democracy was to them a bourgeois quality, a device adopted by the bourgeoisie to defeat the aristocracy that was now being abandoned by capitalists as their conflict with the proletariat became more intense."

There was also a large generational component to the division of the Marxists of the Socialist Party into "Old Guard" and "Militant" camps. Historian Irving Howe, himself a young radical in the Socialist Party in the 1930s, later recalled this aspect:

"I am suspicious of 'generational' interpretations of politics, but I must confess that with regard to the Socialist Party in the thirties it is impossible to avoid at least some generational stress. The clash in style was striking. Not only did the Old Guard treat the ideas of the Militants as a repulsive sort of quasi-Bolshevism; it also found intolerable the enthusiasm of these naive young comrades, their expectation that Norman Thomas booming out the credo of 'socialism in our time' was something to be taken seriously. The youth had entered the movement in the hope of creating a new world, a new life, and now the old-timers came along, grumbling about defeats, mistakes, betrayals. Each generation spoke for its own portion of experience, and only if there had been in this country a line of socialist continuity, so that each generation would not have to start as if from the beginning might this collision have been avoided."

In an early issue of the SPA's theoretical magazine, The American Socialist Quarterly, editors Haim Kantorovitch, Anna Bercowitz, and David P. Berenberg allowed Militant faction adherent Theodore Shapiro space to declaim the Militants' political position. In this article, entitled "The 'Militant' Point of View," Shapiro portrayed the Militant faction as part of an international left wing opposition movement:

"The rise of the militant group within the American Socialist Party accompanies the growth of similar left wing groups throughout the western world. These movements are in effect an active protest against the inactive policies and tactics of the Labor and Socialist International with which our party is affiliated and are, as well, protests against the astounding inertia of so-called "Socialist leaders" the world over. International militancy is a protest against "reformism" and the deviation from the revolutionary Socialism as expounded by Marx.

"The struggle between left wing groups and those who dominate the councils of the International is a struggle that has been inherent in the movement from its very inception. The differences between these groups are fundamental both as to the concept of Socialism and the goal itself ...

"In their support of reactionary governments, in compromising alliances with non-revolutionary parties, in their attitude on the question of war, in their naive reliance on bourgeois 'democratic' institutions, in their hostility to the Soviet Republic, Social Democratic parties manifest their reformism and block the way to the Socialist goal."

In reply to this article, the editors were critical the "anti-democratic propaganda" of "Comrade Shapiro and the militants," noting that "Capitalism wants to suspend democracy" and therefore "it is in their interest to discredit the idea of democracy." However, "instead of defending, the militants help discredit and disparage democracy; the wish to be super-revolutionary is likely to make them unconscious and unwilling helpers of the capitalist class in the latter's fight against democracy." The editors of The American Socialist Quarterly were outspoken in their criticism:

"These comrades have learned their Socialism not from Marx and Engels, but from Soviet Russia; not even from Lenin but from Russian practice. That Russia is building Socialism they have no doubt; but there is no freedom in Russia, no democracy, no equality. Instead there is a dictatorship, a reign of brute terror, of suppression of free thought, free criticism, free living."

=== The Militants and their allies ===
The Militant faction made common cause in their battle with the Old Guard with another significant factional group in the Socialist Party — the so-called "Progressives" led by Norman Thomas and including such important SPA leaders as Devere Allen, Albert Sprague Coolidge, Darlington Hoopes, and Executive Secretary Clarence Senior. The Progressives, although more numerous than the Militants, were actually rather amorphous rather than a tightly disciplined faction, as historian David Shannon notes:

"The Progressives were no caucus within the party such as the Old Guard and the Militants. They were a vague group of recent members, representing many shades of opinion, who were greatly dissatisfied with the slowness, the lack of activity, of the Old Guard. they were not doctrinaire Marxists; indeed, many were not Marxian at all. Their goal was a realignment of American politics whereby there would be a party to represent labor and dirt farmers, based upon principles rather than upon thirst for office and political opportunism. This party once in office would extend democracy and civil liberties, socialize basic industries, and move rapidly in the direction of what is nowadays called the welfare state. If the American electorate should support the Socialist Party and make it such an organization, well and good; if such a party should have to be a new organization, a national farmer-labor party, then the Socialists should go into the new organization."

=== Split of the Old Guard ===
In March 1935 the combined Progressives and Militants of the Socialist Party launched a new weekly newspaper in New York City to supplant the Old Guard-dominated The New Leader — The Socialist Call. The Managing Editor of the new 12-page publication was Bruno Fischer, with Miliitant stalwart Jack Altman acting as Business Manager. The paper took direct aim at the Old Guard from the outset in declaring itself to be "the organ of revolutionary socialism":

"Revolutionary socialism aims at nothing less than the transfer of power to the working class. This, and this alone, can save the workers from tyranny and starvation, from wage-slavery and war. ...

"As capitalism decays it is preparing to rivet upon the workers its open dictatorship. It is preparing to destroy even those feeble democratic institutions that it has so far allowed to exist. ...

"Journals calling themselves 'Socialist' have failed in that they have confused socialism with reform. They have in recent years lived in eternal fear of offending labor leaders, and have therefore kept silent in the face of reaction and racketeering within the unions. In doing so they have damaged the reputation of the Socialist movement, and have lent aid and comfort to the enemies of labor. They have failed to distinguish between the 'liberalism' of Roosevelt and revolutionary socialism. There is need of a Socialist organ that can differentiate between reforms for the preservation of capitalism, and socialism."

SPA National Chairman Leo Krzycki sent the new publication his warm greetings at the time of its launch, although beseeching it to "steer clear of party controversy." The participation of Norman Thomas was even more direct, as he launched a regular weekly column in the pages of The Socialist Call, a piece called "At the Front." Other frequent contributors to the publication during its first year included Haim Kantorovitch, Samuel DeWitt, Herbert Zam, and McAlister Coleman.

== See also ==
- 1934 Declaration of Principles
- Socialist Appeal (Chicago), 1935-1937
- Socialist Appeal (New York), 1937-1941
