= 1934 Declaration of Principles =

- Created: 1934
- Ratified: 1934
- Location: Detroit
- Author(s): Militant faction
- Signatories: Devere Allen

The 1934 Declaration of Principles was a political platform of the Militant faction passed at the Socialist Party of America (SPA) May 1934 National Convention held in Detroit, Michigan. The document committed the organization to "refuse collectively to sanction or support any international war" and condemned the "bogus democracy of capitalist parliamentarism" in favor of establishment of a "genuine workers' democracy." The 1934 Declaration of Principles was instrumental in causing a split of the SPA, with its so-called "Old Guard" faction exiting the organization en masse to establish a rival organization, the Social Democratic Federation, in 1936.

== History ==
The chief author of the 1934 Declaration of Principles was Devere Allen, a pacifist follower of Socialist Party leader Norman Thomas from Connecticut. It was vocally supported by the party's organized "Militant" faction.

In closing the debate at the convention, New York "Old Guard" leader Louis Waldman railed against adoption of the Declaration of Principles:

"I warn against these dangerous, provocative proposals, which will lead the party to ruin. They are anarchistic, illegal, Communist doctrine. This is a wild, irresponsible declaration."

Then Norman Thomas went forward to close the debate in favor of adoption of the new declaration. Waldman recalls:

"When Thomas rose, he received a great ovation from the Militants, but he was pale and nervous. He had been maneuvered into a position inconsistent with his long time stance as a social reformer. He was ill-suited to be a leader of a revolutionary movement committed to violence and dictatorship. I considered him more a captive than a leader. While I felt that the leadership and encouragement he had given the Militants had helped bring the party to the brink of disaster, if not past it, I was nevertheless sympathetic to a man who had been cast in a role so alien to his past.

"But he had passed the point of no return. He rejoiced in the declaration, he said. He praised Allen. As a pacifist, he had little difficulty in making a general and eloquent statement about the horror of war, which he condemned. When he got to the question of seizure of power and the imposition of a dictatorship, he seemed lost. He declared that Fascism, which he said the declaration clearly implied was now at hand, 'left the Socialist Party no alternative but to seize power whether or not it had a majority."

The 1934 Declaration of Principles was approved at the Detroit convention by a vote of delegates representing 10,882 members in favor, and delegates representing 6,512 opposed.
