= Port Huron Statement =

Political document written by the Students for a Democratic Society

The Port Huron Statement is a 1962 political manifesto of the American student activist movement Students for a Democratic Society (SDS). It was written by SDS members, and completed on June 15, 1962, at a United Auto Workers (UAW) retreat outside of Port Huron, Michigan (now part of Lakeport State Park), for the group's first national convention. Under Walter Reuther's leadership, the UAW paid for a range of expenses for the 1962 convention, including use of the UAW summer retreat in Port Huron. A state historical marker was erected on the site in 2025.

== Origins and impact ==
SDS developed from the Student League for Industrial Democracy (SLID), the youth branch of a socialist educational organization known as the League for Industrial Democracy (LID). LID descended from the Intercollegiate Socialist Society, started in 1905. Early in 1960, the SLID changed its name into Students for a Democratic Society (SDS). The Port Huron Statement was adopted at the organization's first convention in 1962, and was based on an earlier draft by staff member Tom Hayden.

The Port Huron Statement was a broad critique of the political and social system of the United States for failing to achieve international peace and economic justice. In foreign policy, the statement took issue with the American government's handling of the Cold War, both the existential threat of nuclear war, and the actual arms race. In domestic matters, it criticized racial discrimination, economic inequality, big businesses, trade unions, and political parties. In addition to its critique and analysis of the American system, the statement also suggested a series of reforms: it proclaimed a need to reshape into two genuine political parties to attain greater democracy, for stronger power for individuals through citizen's lobbies, for more substantial involvement by workers in business management, and for an enlarged public sector with increased government welfare, including a "program against poverty." The document provided ideas of what and how to work for and to improve, and also advocated nonviolent civil disobedience as the means by which student youth could bring forth the concept of "participatory democracy."

The statement also presented SDS's break from the mainstream liberal policies of the postwar years. It was written to reflect their view that all problems in every area were linked to each other. The statement expressed SDS's willingness to work with groups whatever their political inclination. In doing so, they sought the rejection of the extant anti-communism of the time. In the concurrent Cold War environment, such a statement of inclusion for the heretofore "evil" Communist ideology, and by extension, socialist concepts, was definitely seen as a new, radical view contrasting with the position of much of the traditional American Left. The latter had developed a largely anti-communist orthodoxy in the wake of the HUAC and Army-McCarthy hearings. Without being Marxist or pro-communism, the Port Huron conference denounced anti-communism as being a social problem and an obstruction to democracy. They also criticized the United States for its exaggerated paranoia and exclusive condemnation of the Soviet Union, and blamed this for being the reason for failing to achieve disarmament and to assure peace.

The Port Huron Statement, ultimately, was a document of idealism, a philosophical template for a more egalitarian society, a call to participatory democracy where everyone was engaged in issues that affected all people - in civil rights, in political accountability, in labor rights, and in nuclear disarmament. It closed with the following: "If we appear to seek the unattainable, as it has been said, then let it be known that we do so to avoid the unimaginable." The ideals that led those gathered outside Port Huron, Michigan in 1962 to issue this call to action not only added to the discussion of what became the Great Society of the mid-60s, but helped frame the issues that fueled the rising anti-war movement, college campus activism, and the broader social movement known then as the counterculture that carried into the early 1970s in the United States.

== Argument ==
The 25,700-word statement issued a non-ideological call for participatory democracy, based on non-violent civil disobedience and the idea that individual citizens could help make the social decisions which determined their quality of life. Also known as the "Agenda for a Generation", it popularized the term participatory democracy.

It has been described as "a seminal moment in the development of the New Left" and a "classic statement of [its] principles", but it also revealed the 1960s' tension between communitarianism and individualism. In particular, the statement viewed race ("symbolized by the Southern struggle against racial bigotry") and Cold War–induced alienation ("symbolized by the presence of the Bomb") as the two main problems of modern society.

== Issues and recommendations ==
=== Reform of the Democratic Party ===
"An imperative task for these publicly disinherited groups, then, is to demand a Democratic Party responsible to their interests. They must support Southern voter registration and Negro political candidates and demand that Democratic Party liberals do the same (in the last Congress, Dixiecrats split with Northern Democrats on 119 of 300 roll-calls, mostly on civil rights, area redevelopment and foreign aid bills; and the breach was much larger than in the previous several sessions). Labor should begin a major drive in the South. In the North, reform clubs (either independent or Democratic) should be formed to run against big city regimes on such issues as peace, civil rights, and urban needs. Demonstrations should be held at every Congressional or convention seating of Dixiecrats. A massive research and publicity campaign should be initiated, showing to every housewife, doctor, professor, and worker the damage done to their interests every day a racist occupies a place in the Democratic Party. Where possible, the peace movement should challenge the "peace credentials" of the otherwise-liberals by threatening or actually running candidates against them."

=== University reform ===
The Port Huron Statement argued that because "the civil rights and peace and student movements are too poor and socially slighted, and the labor movement too quiescent", it should rally support and strengthen itself by looking to universities, which benefit from their "permanent position of social influence" and being "the only mainstream institution that is open to participation by individuals of nearly any viewpoint". However, it stated that this "will involve national efforts at university reform by an alliance of students and faculty" who "must wrest control of the educational process from the administrative bureaucracy", ally with groups outside the university, integrate "major public issues into the curriculum", "make debate and controversy". In short, "They must consciously build a base for their assault upon the loci of power."

== Cultural references ==
In 1998's movie The Big Lebowski, the main character Jeffrey "The Dude" Lebowski says, "I was one of the authors of the Port Huron Statement. The original Port Huron Statement. Not the compromised second draft."

Aaron Sorkin included a reference to the Port Huron Statement in his 2020 script for The Trial of the Chicago 7. In an exchange between the characters Abbie Hoffman and Tom Hayden: Abbie says to their lawyer, "He [Hayden] does this, it’s a pattern. Read his portion of the Port Huron Statement. He implies possessive pronouns and he uses vague noun modifiers." To which Tom replies, "You read the Port Huron Statement?" Abbie then says, "I’ve read everything you’ve published."

== See also ==
- Civil Rights Movement
- Counterculture of the 1960s
- Occupy movement
- Sharon Statement
- Students for a Democratic Society
