= Slid =

Slid may refer to:

- Slíd, one of the eleven rivers collectively known as the Élivágar in Norse mythology
- "Slid" (Fluke song), a 1993 electronica song
- Student League for Industrial Democracy (disambiguation)

== See also ==
- Slide (disambiguation)
