= Student League for Industrial Democracy =

Student League for Industrial Democracy may refer to two organizations, both student affiliates of the adult League for Industrial Democracy:

- Student League for Industrial Democracy (1930s), which changed its name to Intercollegiate League for Industrial Democracy, and which merged into the American Student Union in 1935
- Student League for Industrial Democracy (1946-1959), which subsequently changed its name to the Students for a Democratic Society
