= Harry W. Laidler =

American socialist writer, editor, and politician (1884–1970)

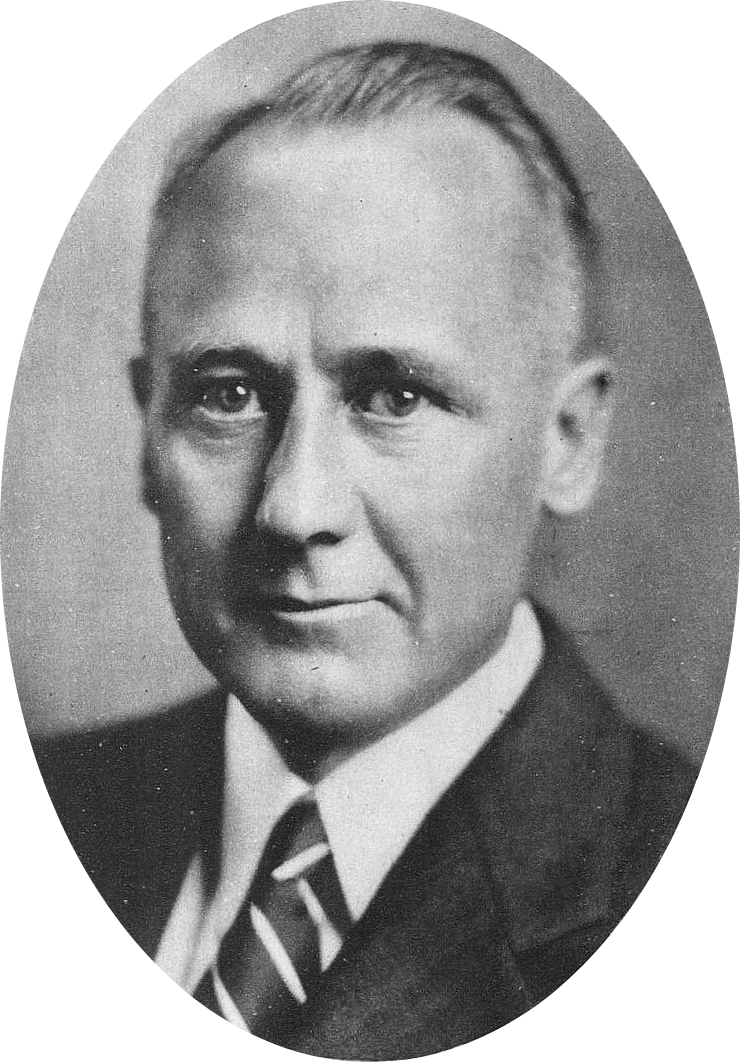
- Laidler c. 1933

Member of the New York City Council from Brooklyn At-Large
- In office January 1, 1940 – December 31, 1941
- Preceded by: Multi-member district
- Succeeded by: Multi-member district

Personal details
- Born: February 18, 1884 Brooklyn, New York, U.S.
- Died: July 14, 1970 (aged 86)
- Party: Socialist (1903–1940); American Labor (1940–1944); Liberal (after 1944)
- Education: Wesleyan University (B.A.)
- Occupation: Writer, editor, politician

Harry Wellington Laidler (February 18, 1884 – July 14, 1970) was an American socialist writer, magazine editor, and politician. He is best remembered as executive director of the League for Industrial Democracy, successor to the Intercollegiate Socialist Society, and for his close political association with perennial Socialist Party Presidential nominee Norman Thomas. He also served a two-year term on the New York City Council.

== Early years ==
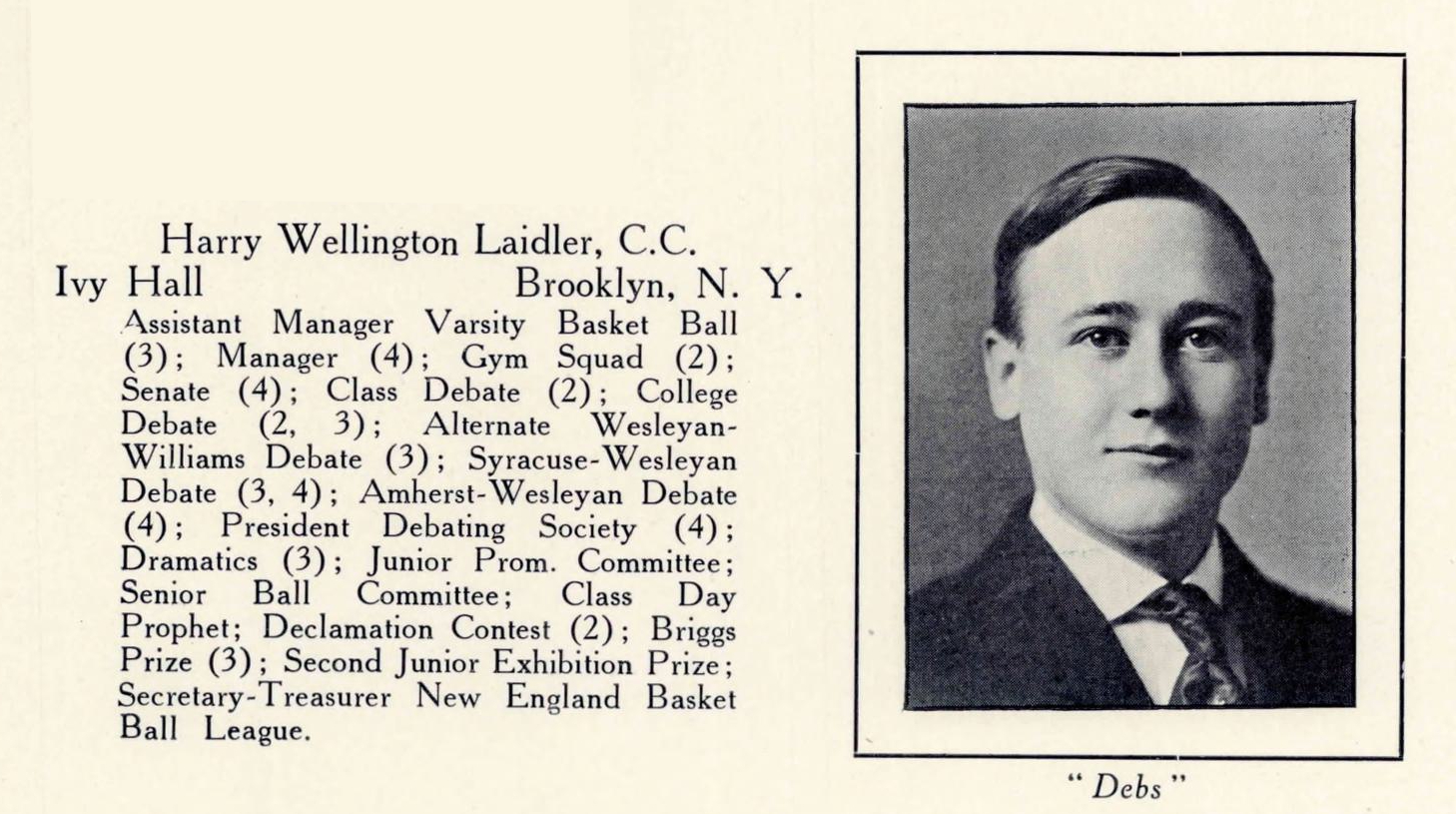
Laidler in the Wesleyan University yearbook, 1908

Harry W. Laidler was born February 18, 1884, in Brooklyn, New York, the son of a salesman. The Laidler family was comfortable, middle-class, and politically liberal. Young Harry attended public school in Brooklyn, before graduating to attend Wesleyan University, from which he obtained a Bachelor's degree in 1907.

Upon graduation, Laidler worked as a reporter for the Brooklyn Eagle newspaper, attending Brooklyn Law School at night. Laidler's graduation from law school in 1910 also marked the end of his career as a news reporter. He subsequently enrolled in Columbia University in New York City, from which he obtained his Ph.D. in 1914.

== Political career ==
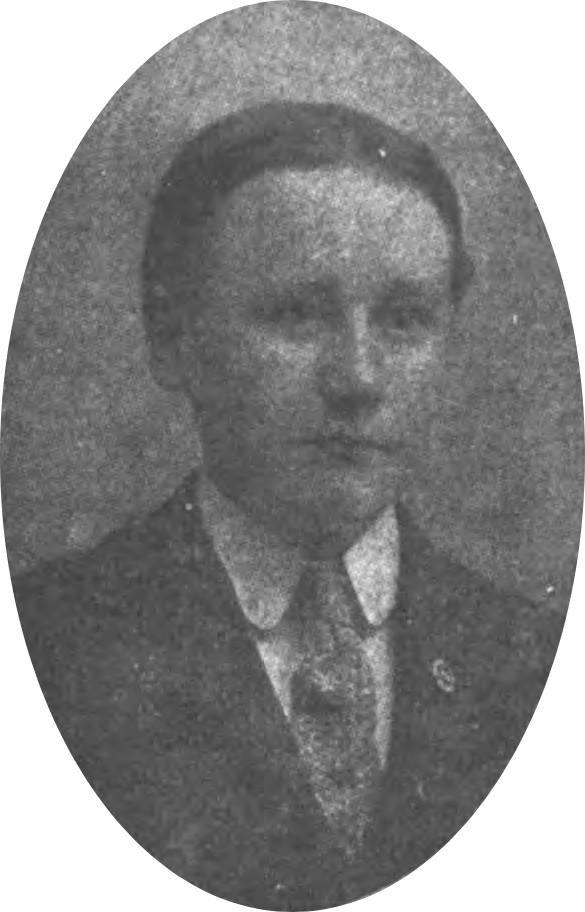
Laidler the "boy orator" as seen in Wilshire's Magazine, October 1905

Harry Laidler was a committed socialist from his teenage years, enrolling in the Socialist Party of America in 1903. In 1905 became a founding member of the Intercollegiate Socialist Society (ISS), a national organization dedicated to advancing the study of socialism on college campuses around the country through lectures, debates, and publications. Laidler was named to the ISS's executive committee as a representative of undergraduates. Upon his graduation from law school in 1910, he was named Secretary of the ISS, serving as well as editor of its magazine, The Intercollegiate Socialist, from the time of its launch in 1913. He continued to edit this publication and its successor, The Socialist Review, until 1921.

In 1921, with much of the youth section of the socialist movement departed to the Communist Party of America and Communist Labor Party, the ISS determined to change its name to the League for Industrial Democracy (LID). The name change marked a shifting of orientation, from an exclusive concentration upon college campuses to bringing socialist ideas to trade unions and the general public. Laidler was named the executive director of the revamped organization—a position which he would continue to hold until 1957.

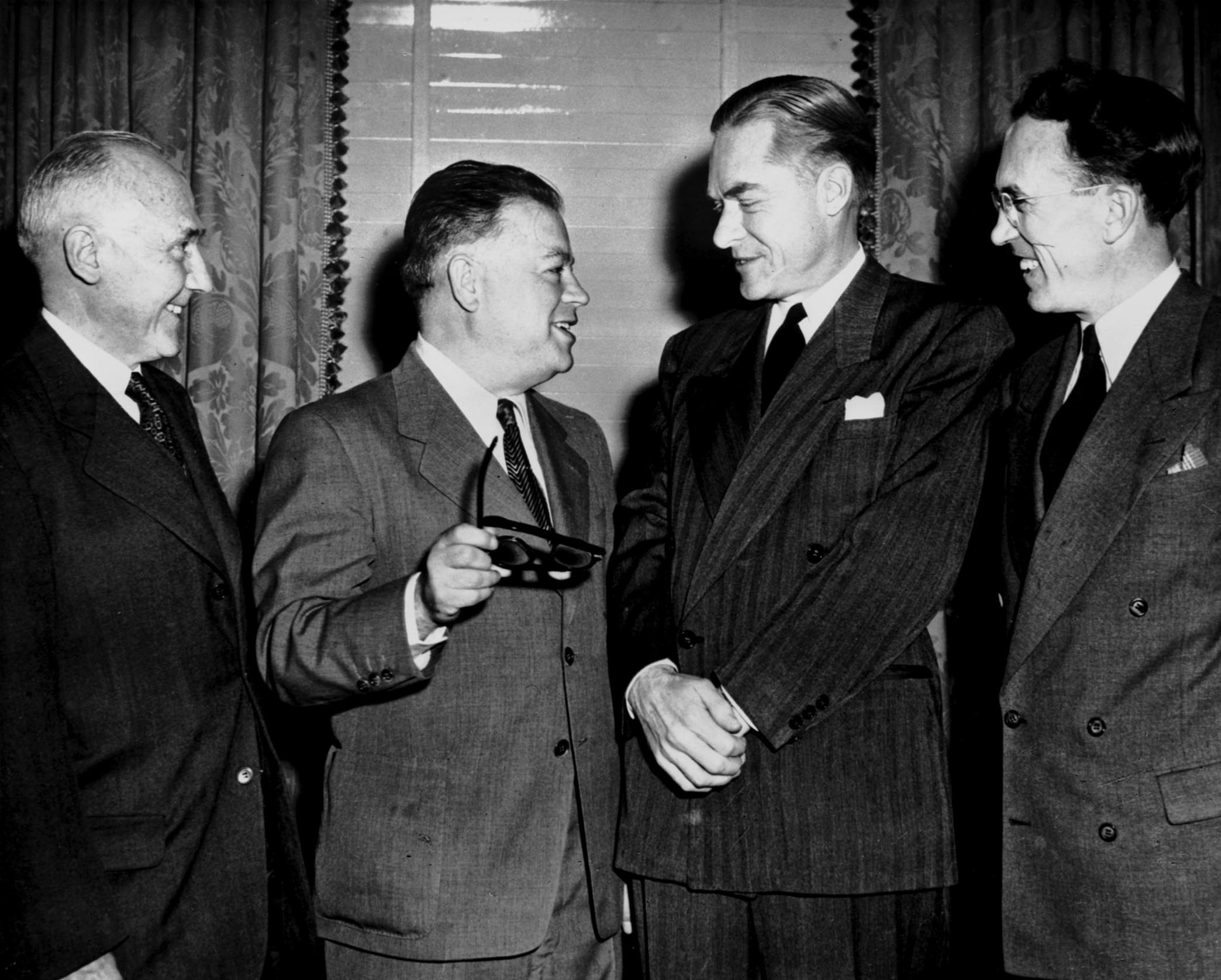
Laidler (far left) alongside David Dubinsky, Gordon R. Clapp and Tommy Douglas at a League for Industrial Democracy luncheon, 1949

Laidler was a close associate of pacifist minister Norman Thomas in the LID. Thomas was a fellow New Yorker born in the same year as Laidler, and the pair shared a middle-class upbringing and a rather academic and technocratic view towards the American Socialist movement. A trusted confidante, Laidler helped to manage Thomas' 1928 and 1932 runs for president as the nominee of the Socialist Party.

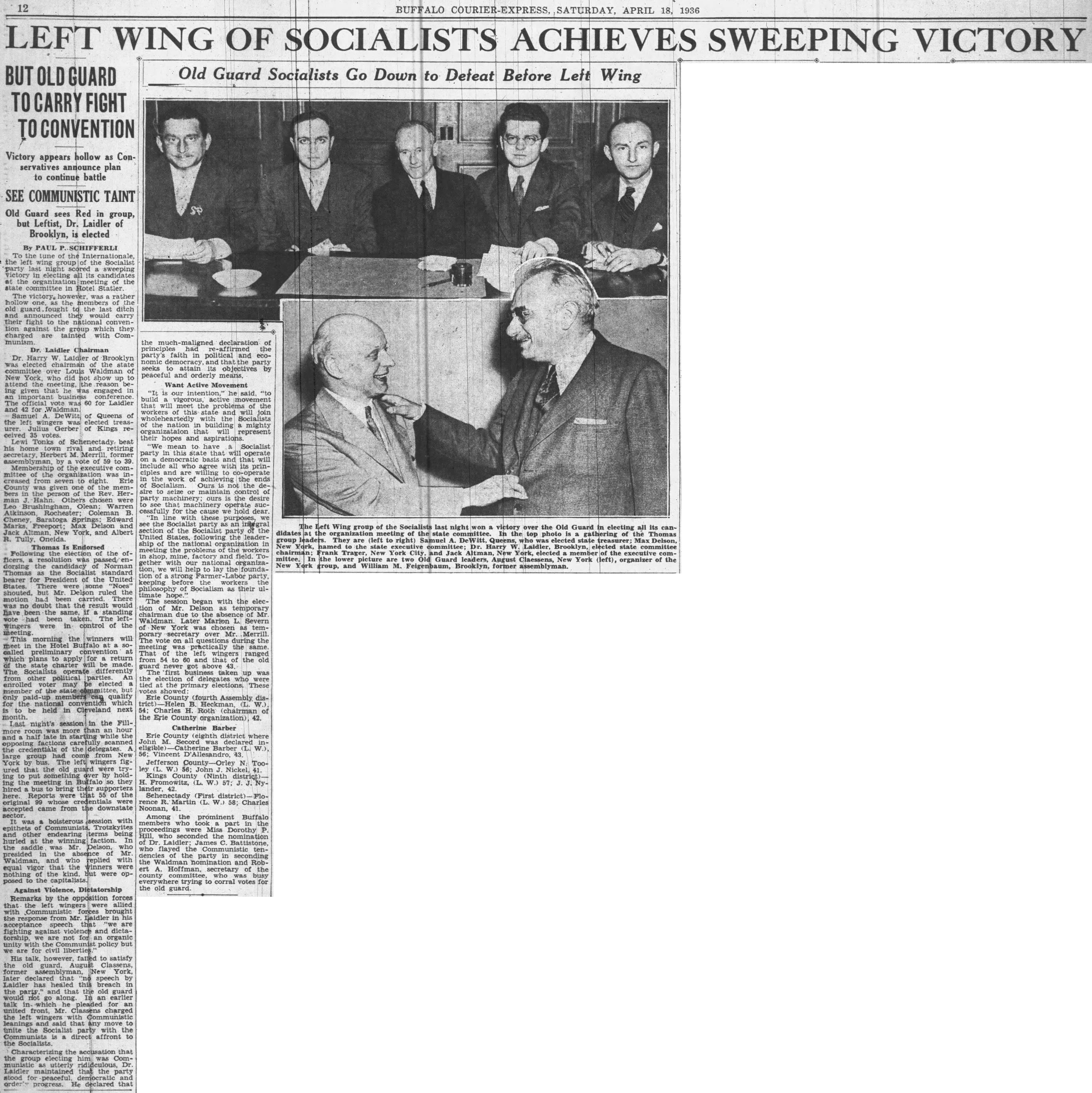
An article in the Buffalo Courier-Express detailing the victory of the Militant faction in gaining control of the Socialist Party of New York, April 18, 1936. Laidler is in the center in the top picture.

During the faction fight between a Left Wing loyal to Thomas and an organized Old Guard faction that wracked the Socialist Party from 1934 to 1936, Laidler played a key role for the young insurgents, running for and winning election as State Secretary of the Socialist Party of New York in a hotly contested race with Old Guard leader Louis Waldman.

Laidler was president of the National Bureau of Economic Research from 1930 to 1932 and again from 1948 to 1949. He also served as head of its board of directors from 1932 to 1934. He frequently contributed book reviews to scholarly journals in this period, a long list which included the American Journal of Sociology, The Annals of the American Academy of Political and Social Science, The Journal of Political Economy, and the American Economic Review.

Laidler was twice a candidate on the Socialist Party ticket, running for Governor of New York in 1936 and for U.S. Senator from New York in 1938. He was later a successful candidate of the American Labor Party for New York City Council in 1940, serving a 2-year term as an alderman.

== Death and legacy ==
Harry Laidler died on July 14, 1970, two years after his friend Norman Thomas.

== Works ==
=== Books and pamphlets ===
- Boycotts and the Labor Struggle: Economic and Legal Aspects. New York: John Lane Co., 1914. —reissued 1968
- The British Co-operative Movement. New York: Co-operative League of America, 1917.
- Public Ownership Throughout the World: A Survey of the Extent of Government Control and Operation. New York: Rand School of Social Science, 1918. —reissued 1924
- Study Courses in Socialism. New York: Intercollegiate Socialist Society, 1919.
- Socialism in Thought and Action. New York: Macmillan, 1920.
- Recent Developments in Socialism: With Bibliographies and Directory. New York: League for Industrial Democracy, 1922.
- Public Ownership, Here and Abroad, Before, during and After the War. New York: League for Industrial Democracy, 1923.
- How America Lives: A Handbook of Industrial Facts. New York: League for Industrial Democracy, 1924.
- Roads to Freedom: A Syllabus for Discussion Groups. New York: League for Industrial Democracy, 1924.
- Canada Shows How to Manage Electrical Power. New York: League for Industrial Democracy, 1924.
- The Coming of a Labor President to Mexico. Richmond, IN: n.p., 1925.
- A History of Socialist Thought. New York: Thomas Y. Crowell Co., 1927.
- Unemployment and Its Remedies. New York: League for Industrial Democracy, 1931.
- Concentration of Control in American Industry. New York: Thomas Y. Crowell Co., 1931.
- The Practical Program of Socialism. Girard, KS: Haldeman-Julius Publications, 1931.
- The Road Ahead: A Primer of Capitalism and Socialism. New York: Thomas Y. Crowell Co., 1932.
- Incentives Under Capitalism and Socialism. New York: League for Industrial Democracy, 1933.
- The City for the People. Chicago: Socialist Party, 1933.
- Socialism. Chicago: Socialist Party, 1934.
- An Appeal to White Collar Workers and the Professions. New York: Socialist Party, n.d. [c. 1934].
- Slash Your Electric Bills. New York: Socialist Party, n.d. [c. 1934].
- Socializing Our Democracy: A New Appraisal of Socialism. New York: Harper and Bros., 1935.
- America in the Depression: Supplement of How America Lives. New York: League for Industrial Democracy, 1935.
- America in the Depression and Under the New Deal. New York, Council for Social Action, 1935.
- A Program for Modern America. New York: Thomas Y. Crowell Co., 1936.
- Putting the Constitution to Work. New York: League for Industrial Democracy, 1936.
- Acceptance Speech. New York: Socialist Party, 1936.
- American Socialism: Its Aims and Practical Program. New York: Harper and Bros., 1937.
- The Consumer Cooperative Movement: A Social Interpretation. With Wallace J. Campbell. New York: League for Industrial Democracy, 1937. —reissued 1940.
- Toward a Farmer-Labor Party. New York: League for Industrial Democracy, 1938.
- Vote a Real Labor Ticket! New York: Socialist Party of New York, 1938.
- The Federal Government and Functional Democracy. New York: League for Industrial Democracy, 1940.
- Maximum Production: Warfare and Welfare. New York: League for Industrial Democracy, 1942.
- Social-Economic Movements: An Historical and Comparative Survey of Socialism, Communism, Co-operation, Utopianism and Other Systems of Reform and Reconstruction. New York: Thomas Y. Crowell Co., 1944. —reissued 1968 as "History of Socialism."
- British Labor's Rise to Power. New York: League for Industrial Democracy, 1945.
- Toward Nationalization of Industry. New York: League for Industrial Democracy, 1947.
- Labor Governments at Work: British, Scandinavian, Australasian. New York: League for Industrial Democracy, 1948.
- Our Changing Industrial Incentives. New York: League for Industrial Democracy, 1949.
- Freedom and the Welfare State. New York: League for Industrial Democracy, 1950.
- Socialism in the United States: A Brief History. New York: League for Industrial Democracy, 1952.

=== Collections edited ===
- State Socialism, Pro and Con: Official Documents and Other Authoritative Selections Showing the World-Wide Replacement of Private by Governmental Industry Before and During the War. With William English Walling. New York: Henry Holt and Co., 1917.
- New Tactics in Social Conflict. With Norman Thomas. New York: Vanguard Press/ League for Industrial Democracy, 1926.
- Prosperity? With Norman Thomas. New York: Vanguard Press/ League for Industrial Democracy, 1927.
- Wells' Social Anticipations. Edited, with introduction by Harry W. Laidler. New York: Vanguard Press, 1927.
- The Socialism of Our Times: A Symposium. With Norman Thomas. New York: Vanguard Press/ League for Industrial Democracy, 1929.
- Socialist Planning and a Socialist Program: A Symposium. New York: Falcon Press, 1932.
- Post-War Planning for Peace and Full Employment: Symposium. New York: League for Industrial Democracy, 1941.
- The Role of the Races in Our Future Civilization: Symposium. New York: League for Industrial Democracy, 1942.
- Post-War Planning for Social Justice: A Symposium. New York: League for Industrial Democracy, 1942.
- The Third Freedom: Freedom from Want. New York: League for Industrial Democracy, 1943.
- Forty Years of Education: The Task Ahead: A Symposium. New York: League for Industrial Democracy, 1945.
- A Program for Labor and Progressives: Symposium. New York: League for Industrial Democracy, 1946.
- World Cooperation and Social Progress: A Symposium. New York: League for Industrial Democracy, 1951.
- Needed: A Moral Awakening in America: A Symposium. New York: League for Industrial Democracy, 1952.

=== Articles ===
- "The New Capitalism and the Socialist," The Annals of the American Academy of Political and Social Science, vol. 149 (May 1930), pp. 12–21.
- "More Government in Business," The Annals of the American Academy of Political and Social Science, vol. 178, (March 1935), pp. 148–154.
- "New Zealand's Democracy," Far Eastern Survey, vol. 13, no. 10 (May 17, 1944), pg. 91.

== See also ==
- Intercollegiate Socialist Society
- League for Industrial Democracy
