= League for Industrial Democracy =

American democratic socialist organization

- Abbreviation: LID
- Predecessor: Intercollegiate Socialist Society
- Founded: November 1921
- Headquarters: New York City
- Executive director: Harry W. Laidler (1921–1957)
- President: Robert Morss Lovett (1921–1939); John Dewey (1939–)

The League for Industrial Democracy (LID) was founded as a successor to the Intercollegiate Socialist Society in 1921. Members decided to change its name to reflect a more inclusive and more organizational perspective.

== Background ==
=== Intercollegiate Socialist Society ===
The I.S.S. was founded in 1905 by Upton Sinclair, Walter Lippmann, Clarence Darrow, and Jack London with the stated purpose of throwing "light on the world-wide movement of industrial democracy known as socialism."

=== Name change ===
In the spring of 1921, the ISS held a vote regarding the name and goals of their organization. Harry W. Laidler announced: "the members of the Intercollegiate Socialist Society had declared themselves in favor of the change in name and purpose." In November, the organization assumed its new name and enlarged its scope to addressing society at large. They also presented their new guiding principle: "Education for a New Social Order Based on Production for Public Use and Not for Private Profit."

=== Early years ===
In its early years, the LID addressed societal problems such as poverty, child labor, work conditions, and poor housing conditions, under the leadership of notable activists: Robert Morss Lovett, Charles P. Steinmetz, Florence Kelley, and Stuart Chase. It became the base for leftwing intellectuals, otherwise known as Muckrakers. During the Great Depression of the 1930s, the LID organized radio stations and broadcasts centered around the New Deal. Throughout its history, the LID has called itself a proponent of the labor movement. The group saw this movement as a progressive force that is misunderstood by intellectuals. The goal of this is to break down these perceived boundaries and to promote "education for increasing democracy in our economic, political, and cultural life"

In 1921, Robert Morss Lovett was elected the first president of the LID. In 1939, the philosopher John Dewey was elected to succeed him.

Affiliates in the 1980s were mostly anti-communists and focus their energy on democracy building in places such as Eastern Europe, Africa, and Central America, while paying very little attention to its domestic program.

== Student affiliates ==
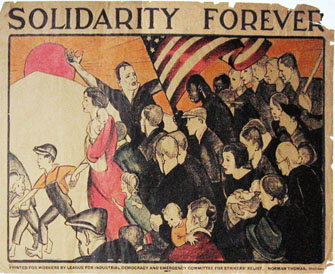
1932 poster for League for Industrial Democracy, designed by Anita Willcox during the Great Depression, showing solidarity with struggles of workers and poor in America

Its campus presence waned until the Great Depression of the 1930s led to an increase in radical student activism. The collegiate section was reorganized into an autonomous Student League for Industrial Democracy (SLID) in 1933. This merged with the Communist National Student League in 1935 to create the popular front American Student Union. LID activity on campus remained somewhat dormant until 1946, when the Student League for Industrial Democracy was reconstituted.

=== Students for a Democratic Society ===
On January 1, 1960, the SLID changed its name to the Students for a Democratic Society and began to take a more radical direction. In July 1962 Michael Harrington, then chair, and Tom Kahn clashed with Tom Hayden and Alan Haber over their Port Huron Statement, in particular its

- suggestion that the labor movement was "too quiescent, to be counted with enthusiasm" as an agent for change,
- espousal of participatory democracy and dislike of formal offices, seen as potentially undemocratic and lacking accountability, and
- failure to explicitly exclude communists from its vision of the New Left.

By 1965, SDS had separated from the LID, but it ended national activity in 1969, after it had been taken over by Maoist groups, some of which advocated and committed political terrorism.

== Sources ==
- Bernard K. Johnpoll and Mark R. Yerburgh (eds.), The League for Industrial Democracy: A Documentary History. In three volumes. Westport, CT: Greenwood Press, 1980.
- Kirkpatrick Sale, SDS. New York: Random House, 1973.
