= C. Clark Kissinger =

American communist

Charles Clark Kissinger
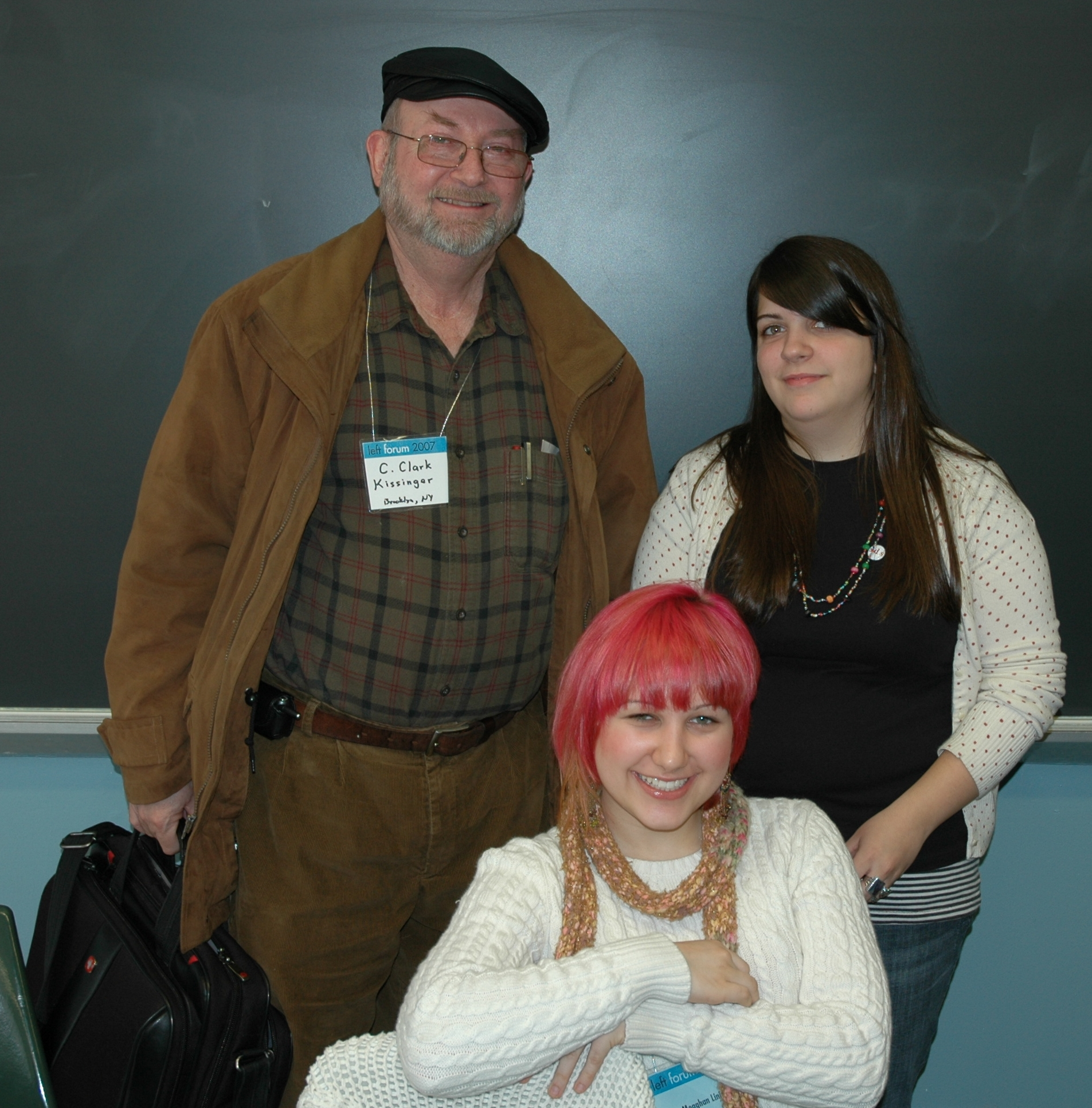
- C. Clark Kissinger (back row, on the left) at the Left Forum, March 2007.

C. Clark Kissinger (born 1940) was the National Secretary of Students for a Democratic Society in 1964–1965. He visited the People's Republic of China twice during the Cultural Revolution, and is a devoted Maoist. His writings frequently appear in Revolution, journal of the Revolutionary Communist Party, USA. He was an activist for Refuse and Resist and Not in Our Name, and is an activist for World Can't Wait.

== Early life and education ==
Kissinger graduated from the University of Chicago in 1960. He had previously attended Shimer College, a Great Books college then located in Mount Carroll, Illinois. Subsequently, Kissinger became a graduate student in mathematics at the University of Wisconsin.

== 1960s activism ==
As National Secretary of SDS, Kissinger was the principal organizer of the first March on Washington against the war on Vietnam in April, 1965. He faced heavy pressure from the League for Industrial Democracy to incorporate opposition to North Vietnam, but kept the motto of the march as simply "End the War in Vietnam", focusing on the need for immediate US withdrawal. He hoped to build SDS by being the first organization to hold a national march against the war.

In 1968, the Chicago Peace Council hired Kissinger to organize a march against the Vietnam War on April 27. Later in the year, he helped organize demonstrations against the Democratic Party National Convention, and testified at the trial of the Chicago Seven.

== Subsequent activism ==
In the early 1970s, Kissinger was a founder and national officer of the US China Peoples Friendship Association.

In 1987, Kissinger co-founded the human rights activist group Refuse & Resist!. He became head of the group's operations in support of Mumia Abu-Jamal. In that capacity, he became particularly known for successfully lobbying the City Council of Santa Cruz, California to adopt a resolution supporting a new trial for Abu-Jamal. In 2000, Kissinger served 90 days in jail after being convicted of violating his probation by speaking at a rally against the death penalty in Philadelphia. The probation had been imposed based on Kissinger's conviction for participating in a peaceful protest in support of Abu-Jamal in Philadelphia. Kissinger had requested permission from the court to speak at the rally, but it was denied.

In the 1990s, Kissinger also drew attention for his position that the participants in the 1992 Los Angeles riots were social revolutionaries rather than rioters as portrayed in the media.

In 2002, Kissinger was the coordinator of the Not In Our Name statement of conscience against the impending war on Iraq. Pro-war commentators such as Christopher Hitchens and Laura Ingraham pointed to Kissinger's involvement as indicating that opposition to the war was being organized by the far left. Subsequently, he was also the convener of the International Commission of Inquiry on Crimes Against Humanity Committed by the Bush Administration. When the commission released its findings, he was quoted as saying "We want this to be a step in the building of mass resistance to war, to torture, to the destruction of the earth."

Kissinger is currently the manager of Revolution Books in New York City.
