= National Student League =

- Abbreviation: NSL
- Predecessor: New York Student League
- Merged into: American Student Union (ASU)
- Formation: 1931
- Dissolved: December 1935
- Type: Student activist organization
- Purpose: Anti-war activism, free speech fights, protests against fee hikes, labor solidarity, and anti-fascism
- Headquarters: New York City
- Affiliations: Communist Party USA

The National Student League was a Communist led organization of college and high school students in the United States.

== Organizational history ==
=== Origins ===
The organizations founding came about as a result of a case of censorship on the campus of the City College of New York in 1931. The Social Problems Club had begun publishing a new magazine, Frontiers, in March 1931 that contained an anti-ROTC editorial. College president Frederick B. Robinson had copies of the magazine confiscated and suspended the charter of the Social Problems Club. When Club members published a leaflet protesting this, he suspended them as well.

The students formed a broad alliance with left leaning groups in other New York colleges to form a protest and letter writing campaign in favor of the suspended students, who were eventually reinstated. They organized themselves permanently as the New York Intercollegiate Student Council, composed of eleven student groups on seven local campuses. Later that fall they reorganized as the New York Student League and finally as the National Student League over the 1931-1932 Christmas break.

Unlike other "mass organizations" of the time, the initial impetus for the NSLs creation did not come from Communist Party or Young Communist League leadership, but began as a "grassroots" effort of Communist and Communist sympathizing students at CCNY and the other New York colleges. The YCL was focusing more on blue collar youth at the time and was hesitant about recruiting among "bourgeois" college youth. The YCL approved the group's creation, however, and provided some of the initial contacts to create an inter-campus organization.

=== Activism ===
The NSL began making a name for itself by involvement in the TUUL-led Harlan County miners strike. Inspired by the example of Waldo Frank and Theodore Dreiser's writers' delegation, the group decided to send a student delegation to Harlan County to provide relief for the striking miners and to investigate conditions in the area. About eighty students departed New York for Kentucky by bus on March 23, 1932. The students were met by angry crowds and police harassment and were unable to aid the strike, though the trip generated a large amount of publicity for the strike and the NSL.

That April the NSL became active in the campaign to defend Reed Harris, editor of the Columbia Spectator who had been expelled after writing a series of editorials on conditions in Columbia's dining halls. The NSL quickly came to Harris's defense, organizing protest meetings which drew hundreds of students and, on April 6, 1932, the first collegiate student strike of the decade. Despite opposition from the faculty, athletes and the local fraternities, enough pressure was kept on the Columbia administration to persuade it to re-instate Harris on April 20. The NSL participated in a number of free speech fights, protests against student fee hikes and anti-war activity until its merger with the Student League for Industrial Democracy to form the American Student Union in December 1935.

One of its most dramatic activities was organizing the National Student Strike Against War on April 13, 1934, and 1935, commemorating American entry into the First World War. The first strike, coordinated with the SLID, drew 25,000 students nationwide, 15,000 of whom were in New York City. The second demonstration, however, in April 1935, drew 175,000 students, 160,000 of whom outside of New York, and was co-sponsored by the National Student Federation of America, the National Council of Methodist Youth, YMCA, YWCA, the Interseminary Movement, and the youth section of the American League Against War and Fascism, among others.

An important aspect of the two annual strikes was an Americanized version of the Oxford Pledge, in which students pledged "We will not support the government of the United States in any war it may conduct." This became a point of tension in the period of negotiation on the merger with SLID, because the NSL, following the Comintern line after the Seventh World Congress in summer 1935, came out in favor of a Popular front against fascism and Collective security which seemed at odds with the isolationist and pacifist spirit of the pledge.

=== Merger ===
With the NSL and the SLID working together so often, sentiment in favor of amalgamation began to form within both groups. The NSL took the first steps toward unity by inviting the SLID to the Student Congress Against War in Chicago in December 1932. Though organized on the basis of the Communist-led World Committee Against War and Fascism that had been held that August in Amsterdam, the NSL succeeded in toning down the Third Period anti-socialist rhetoric, and succeeded in getting the SLID behind the Congress, as well as many pacifist organizations. The NSL's conference later that month officially proposed a merger.

Despite being rebuffed, the NSL passed another pro-amalgamation resolution the next year. The SLID was initially suspicious of the NSL's proposals; SLID regarded itself as the more genuinely democratic group and was wary of the NSL's uncritical view of the USSR. Nevertheless, after the success of the April 1935 peace strike and growing sentiment in favor of anti-fascist unity in the face of repression, the SLID merged with NSL and a group of unorganized liberal students to form the American Student Union in December 1935.

== Publications ==
- Student Conference on Negro Student Problems: Report on the Conference and the Program and Resolutions, Adopted at Columbia University, April 17, 1933. New York: National Student Committee Negro Student Problems, 1933.
- Building a Militant Student Movement: Program of the National Student League. New York: National Student League, 1934.
- Students Fight War. New York: National Executive Committee of the National Student League, 1935.
