= Student League for Industrial Democracy (1946–1959) =

- Abbreviation: SLID
- Predecessor: Student League for Industrial Democracy (pre-1935)
- Successor: Students for a Democratic Society
- Formation: 1946
- Dissolved: January 1, 1960; 66 years ago
- Type: Student activist organization
- Parent organization: League for Industrial Democracy
- Affiliations: National Student Association (from 1948); International Union of Socialist Youth (associate member, from 1952); Young Adult Council (from 1953)

The Student League for Industrial Democracy (SLID) of 1946 to 1959 was the second incarnation of the League for Industrial Democracy's student group. It changed its name to the Students for a Democratic Society on January 1, 1960, and severed its connection to the LID in 1965.

== Origins ==
After the autonomous Student League for Industrial Democracy merged with other groups to form the American Student Union in 1935, the League for Industrial Democracy still tried to keep a campus presence. In the late 1930s and early war years they organized summer institutes to educate students in union organizing and sponsored lecture tours by Joel I. Seidman and LeRoy Bower. After the war, with the campus population swelling with returning veterans on the GI Bill, renewed interest in the LID began to be felt at the grassroots. The first post-war campus chapter was founded by Frank Wallick at Antioch College. The LID engaged Jesse Cavileer and Elizabeth Healy to begin an organizing tour of the country's colleges, setting up SLID chapters at City College of New York, Brooklyn College, Harvard, and Cornell. During the Christmas break of 1946-1947 a provisional conference was held at the Rand School to reconstitute SLID. It was attended by representatives of 30 colleges and three high schools. Eric Hayden was elected temporary chairman and Gustav Papenek temporary vice-chairman. An executive committee was also elected.

== Activism ==
=== 1940s ===
Forty delegates from twelve schools attended the SLIDS first official post-war convention in April 1947 at the Labor Temple in New York. Papanek was elected president, John Roche vice-president and Hannah Kaiser secretary. The convention passed a resolution banning all "totalitarians" from membership, a measure designed to keep out Communists and other infiltrators. The Cornell chapter was tasked with publishing a national organ, SLID Voice. SLID enjoyed popularity in the immediate post-war years, before the concept of the Cold War and McCarthyism had set in. By 1948 it had 700 members.

The group's activities during this period included collecting funds to aid striking workers, walking on picket lines, toured Saskatchewan (which had recently elected a social democratic government) successfully protesting against segregation at the University of Michigan, less successfully against censorship of student publications and organizing an annual leadership institute at Port Huron, Michigan at a facility jointly owned by the Michigan CIO and the UAW. Internationally the group led protests against the 1948 coup in Czechoslovakia and repression against student activists in East Germany.

The SLIDs second official post-war convention was held in December 1947 at Wayne State University in Detroit, in conjunction with a conference on "Community Sources of Prejudice". Fifty-one delegates from 16 colleges were present. The following year four regional committees: Ohio, Michigan, metropolitan New York and Up-state New York. Most of the organizers had no difficulty establishing SLID recognition on campus. The SLIDs final convention of the decade was held at Freedom House in New York were some 20 chapters were represented.

=== 1950s ===
The fortunes of the group declined sharply in the 1950s, and near the end of the decade it had under 100 active members. Because of the escalating Cold War abroad and the dramatic rise and decline of the Henry Wallace Progressive movement at home, the SLID canceled its 1949 convention. Instead they met in April 1950, at the Rand School, where they approved more plans for summer institutes and student opinion surveys. They also began to co-sponsor a lecture series with the Young Peoples Socialist League and Students for Democratic Action called "Conflicting Ideologies of Our Time" which featured such speakers as Daniel Bell, Aaron Levenstein and Ruth Fischer. SLID also acquired one of their most famous leaders that year, James Farmer, who became Student Field Organizer.

By the June 1951 convention in Detroit membership was down to 500. Farmer set out on an energetic organizing tour of the Midwest from October 1951 to October 1952, visiting 22 colleges and 10 high schools. The next spring he also toured the West Coast. In February 1953 Harry Lewak became an organizer in New York. Through these efforts the SLID was able to maintain an active presence on several important campuses, including Antioch, Oberlin, Harvard and Wayne, but the organization was still in decline. In reference to groups situation, its 1953 convention announced the beginning of "Operation Bootstrap", a series of initiatives to revive the group.

Factional problems also hindered the SLIDs progress. Bogdan Denitch, a Shachtmanite member of YPSL, organized a "Red Caucus" within SLID and took control of the CCNY Evening Session chapter. This group tried to change the nature of SLID toward a more Leninist "disciplined" group. After a two-year fight with the National executive Committee they were expelled.

By the mid to late 1950s SLID had about 100 members and possibly three active chapters, the most important one at Yale. The 1957 convention drew 39 delegates and the 1958 convention only 13. A report of an organizing tour of the mid-west in 1938 recorded on functioning chapter at Madison, Wisconsin, three to eight members at Ann Arbor, and one member each at Oberlin, Ohio State, Indiana, Purdue and Minnesota.

The fortunes of the group began to turn around in the late 1950s when Al Haber joined the SLID chapter at Ann Arbor. He was able to launch a radical student political party VOICE. Haber was elected SLID vice-president in 1959, and became, successively, field organizer and president in 1960. At his suggestion the group changed its name to the Students for a Democratic Society.

== Affiliations ==
SLID was represented at the founding convention of the National Student Association at Madison, Wisconsin in September 1948, and remained affiliated through the 1950s. According to Andre Schiffrin, leader of the Yale chapter and later SLID president, none of the SLIDers were aware of that groups ties to the CIA. In early 1952 SLID became an associate (non-voting) member of the International Union of Socialist Youth. It had to be an associate member because of its status as a tax exempt "educational" association, which allowed union subsidies to LID and SLID. In 1953 SLID affiliated to the Young Adult Council, the US division of the World Assembly of Youth.

== Publications ==
- Once upon a time-- New York, N.Y. : The League, 1950
- Campus rebels; a brief history of the Student League for Industrial Democracy. by Harold Lewack New York, Student League for Industrial Democracy 1953
- S.L.I.D. organizers manual by Harold Lewack and Andre Schiffrin New York, N.Y. : Student League for Industrial Democracy, 1955
- Subsidization of the arts : a survey of governmental aid to music, art and the theater in the free world by Emmett Groseclose New York, N.Y. : Student League for Industrial Democracy, 1955 (SLID Research tracts #1)
- Steward training in C.I.O. unions by Mildred Bersh New York, N.Y. : Student League for Industrial Democracy, 1955 (SLID Research tracts #2)
- The worker priests by Marie Therese Dubalen New York, N.Y. : Student League for Industrial Democracy, 1955 (SLID Research tracts #3)
- The quiet revolution, a study of the Antigonish Movement. by Harold Lewack New York, N.Y. : Student League for Industrial Democracy, 1955 (SLID Research tracts #4)
- Distribution of income in the United States by Gabriel Kolko New York, N.Y. : Student League for Industrial Democracy, 1955 (SLID Research tracts #5)
- Resolutions Approved by the 1957 National Convention of the Student League for Industrial Democracy, New York City. New York: Student League for Industrial Democracy, 1957
- Background papers # 1, 2 & 3, Summer Institute of the Student League for Industrial Democracy : University of Wisconsin, Madison, Wisc., July 7-13, 1958. New York: Student League for Industrial Democracy, 1958
