= Refuse & Resist! =

American human rights activist group

Refuse & Resist! ("R&R!") was a human rights activist group founded in New York City in 1987 by Emile de Antonio, Dore Ashton, Dennis Brutus, John Gerassi, Abbie Hoffman, William Kunstler, C. Clark Kissinger, Conrad Lynn, Sonia Sanchez, Rev. Fernando Santillana, and other activists who were concerned that the American government, epitomized by U.S. President Ronald Reagan, advocated a far right-wing political program directed against the political rights of its people. Artist Keith Haring created R&R!'s logo in 1988. The organization's national office was located in New York City, with chapters at various times in Atlanta, Georgia; Chicago, Illinois; Honolulu, Hawaii; Los Angeles, California; Miami, Florida; Philadelphia, Pennsylvania; Milwaukee, Wisconsin; Cleveland, Ohio; New York City and the San Francisco Bay Area. The organization officially dissolved in 2006. At that time, the national office closed, and the organization's files transferred to the Tamiment Library at New York University.

Refuse & Resist! opposed censorship, war, acts of police brutality, and advocated in support of political prisoners and against the death penalty. The organization advocated reproductive rights and played an active role in the defense of abortion clinics. It also supported rights for undocumented immigrants. The group did not endorse candidates for elected public office.

== Governance and methods ==
The organization was made up of affiliated independent organizations, individuals, local chapters, and less formal national 'networks' organized around specific initiatives or interests. The central form of the organization was a National Council which met periodically to "identify new reactionary attacks and to encourage resistance to them."

From September 1987 through early 2002, Refuse & Resist! published the print periodical CounterAttack and from 1995 until 2006 it maintained the Refuse & Resist! website as media for information about political and social events of concern in the United States and internationally.

In 1988, R&R! organized Resist in Concert! at the New York Palladium, with performances by Sinéad O'Connor, Afrika Bambaataa, De La Soul, Ikey C & Easy-Ad, Karen Finley, Lenny Kaye, Shinehead, and others.

In addition to the Resist in Concert! initiative, Refuse & Resist! involved and supported progressive art and artists, including supporting artists and arts organizations whose work was the object of governmental repression. Visual and performing artists, especially in New York and Los Angeles, were active in the Artists' Network of Refuse & Resist! and experimented with ways to integrate political themes of resistance with aesthetic expression.

R&R! initiated a periodic Courageous Resister Award to recognize important individual acts of resistance and in support of civil rights and civil liberties. Recipients included health care workers, activists against police brutality, artists, and even small towns. The first awards were presented at Resist in Concert! 1988, by Susan Sarandon, Robbie Conal, and Philip Agee.

R&R! organized public demonstrations and other forms of protest in support of abortion rights, immigrants' rights, political prisoners, and for other causes. For example, R&R! activists were actively involved in demonstrations against the 1991 invasion of Iraq and marched with thousands in the streets of New York City to protest the politics of the 2004 Republican National Convention.

== Campaigns ==
R&R! organized against many forms of censorship. For example, when in 1989 the U.S. Congress adopted the so-called Jesse Helms Amendment, which required the National Endowment for the Art not to fund "obscene or indecent" art, R&R! organized both the "Jesse Helms Degenerate Art Show" and the "New Blasphemy Forum" in New York City as forums for artists to express opposition to the new restrictions. Likewise, R&R! came to the defense of artists, such as Ice T, whose art was the object of censorship.

R&R! opposed the invasion of privacy and government surveillance. For example, when the 1990 Census was conducted, R&R! organized public demonstrations across the U.S., in which census forms were burned in protest of what they saw as intrusive questions asked on the forms.

R&R! upheld reproductive freedom for women and posed the slogan "Abortion on Demand & without Apology!" In this activity, they frequently defended physicians and women's health clinics. In response to the judicial opinions in Webster v. Reproductive Health Services and Rust v. Sullivan, R&R! deliberately disrupted two sessions of the U.S. Supreme Court, which was the first time that court had ever experienced public protest. In related events, activists occupied the offices of U.S. Congressman Henry Hyde and the National Right to Life Committee, both whom opposed abortion. During the 1990s, R&R! were vocal and uncompromising opponents of Operation Rescue, a group known for staging protests and civil disobedience against abortion clinics. Refuse & Resist! also co-initiated the National Day of Appreciation for Abortion Providers in 1996, which has since become an annual event.

R&R! supported the defense of Mumia Abu-Jamal, an early member, who was accused and convicted of murder in 1982. Citing suppressed and allegedly falsified evidence presented against Mumia, R&R! joined with many others in exposing his trial and conviction as political persecution and a vendetta conducted by the Philadelphia Police Department. R&R! was active in the international "Free Mumia" campaign. in 1995, R&R initiated a series of "Philly Freedom Summers" in which students and other youth converged in Philadelphia, to raise public awareness and support for Abu-Jamal and for a new trial. It was during the first summer that they spoke out against Pennsylvania Governor Tom Ridge, who signed a death warrant for Abu-Jamal that June. That August the execution order was stayed, but Abu-Jamal remains in prison pending the outcome of his appeal.

R&R! supported the rights of all immigrants, raising the slogan "We Are All Illegals!" Activists often protested at the offices of the Immigration and Naturalization Service (INS) and at the United States Coast Guard base in Miami, Florida, in opposition to the return of Haitian refugees back to Haiti. In Texas, activists were arrested for climbing the fences of a 'secret' INS detention facility and exposing its activities.

R&R! organized the first National Conference Against the War on Drugs. They revealed photographs of alleged "boot camps" supposedly being used to incarcerate youths as punishment for what they felt were victimless drug crimes.
