= A History of Socialist Thought (Laidler book) =

1927 book by Harry Laidler

- Author: Harry Laidler
- Subject: History of socialism
- Publisher: Thomas Y. Crowell Company
- Publication date: 1927
- Pages: 713

A History of Socialist Thought is a 1927 history book by Harry Laidler.

== Bibliography ==
- Brissenden, P. F. (1928). "Review of A History of Socialist Thought". Political Science Quarterly. 43 (3): 464–468. doi:10.2307/2142987. ISSN 0032-3195. JSTOR 2142987.
- Edwards, Lyford P. (1927). "Review of A History of Socialist Thought". American Journal of Sociology. 33 (3): 494–495. doi:10.1086/214466. ISSN 0002-9602. JSTOR 2765328.
- K., E. M. (1928). "Skippety-Skip Socialism". The Sewanee Review. 36 (4): 510. ISSN 0037-3052. JSTOR 27534342.
- Marburg, Anita (1929). "Review of A History of Socialist Thought". Social Service Review. 3 (2): 333–334. doi:10.1086/630556. ISSN 0037-7961. JSTOR 30009354.
- Meriam, R. S. (1928). "Review of A History of Socialist Thought; The Natural History of Revolution". The American Political Science Review. 22 (1): 195–197. doi:10.2307/1945082. ISSN 0003-0554. JSTOR 1945082.
- Meusel, Alfred (1929). "Review of A History of Socialist Thought". Weltwirtschaftliches Archiv. 30: 182–184. ISSN 0043-2636. JSTOR 40413943.
- Wehrwein, George S. (1927). "Review of A History of Socialist Thought". The Journal of Land & Public Utility Economics. 3 (4): 425. doi:10.2307/3138957. ISSN 1548-9000. JSTOR 3138957.
