= Reed Harris =

American writer and government official (1909–1982)

Reed Harris (November 5, 1909 – October 15, 1982) was an American writer, publisher, and U.S. government official who served as deputy director of the United States Information Agency.

== Life and career ==
Harris was born on November 5, 1909, in New York City. He attended Staunton Military Academy and in 1932 graduated from Columbia College, where he edited the school newspaper, the Columbia Spectator. His college classmates voted him "most likely to succeed". He was a member of the Student League for Industrial Democracy.

In the fall of 1931, he characterized the college football program as a "semiprofessional racket". He published inflammatory articles in which he exposed the Nacoms and criticized the university's administration. He was expelled in April 1932, but following student protests he was readmitted twenty days later. In the fall of 1932, he published King Football: The Vulgarization of the American College (1932), an exposé of commercialism in college football and an attack on higher education that accused United States schools of turning out "regimented lead soldiers of mediocrity". "To put forth winning football teams," he wrote, "alumni, faculty and trustees will lie, cheat and steal, unofficially." He called the players "privileged mugs", said the faculty had a "percentage of utter numbskulls", attacked Columbia President Nicholas Murray Butler, and praised college newspaper editors and Soviet Russia. The book included a defense of academic freedom that included the right of communists to teach.

Harris worked as a freelance journalist in New York City until 1934, when he joined the Works Progress Administration, where he helped edit Project, a magazine that publicized the work of the Federal Emergency Relief Administration, and later became assistant director of the Federal Writers' Project. He resigned effective July 1, 1938, unhappy with the FWP's leadership for failing to rein in its more militant left-wing staff members.

Harris edited travel books for a short time at Robbins Travel House. In 1939 he became an administrative officer for the National Emergency Council, a body tasked with inter-agency coordination. He was planning chief for the Office of War Information (OWI) from 1942 to 1944, then joined the air force, and returned to the OWI in 1945 when it became part of the State Department. In 1950, he became deputy director of the International Information Administration (IIA), the parent agency of the Voice of America.

Reed Harris testifying before the McCarthy committee, February, 1953

For three days in February and March 1953, he testified before Senator Joseph McCarthy's Permanent Subcommittee on Investigations. McCarthy quoted from King Football and Harris denied that it represented his current opinions. Harris disavowed ever believing in communism except in the sense of collectivism in "convents and monasteries". According to Time, "Harris showed a bureaucrat's tendency to engage in long-winded arguments with his pursuers." He accused McCarthy of using one-sided testimony to charge the IIA with supporting communism and said McCarthy's efforts were harming anti-communist propaganda efforts. At one point he told McCarthy: "It is my neck, my public neck, you are trying very skillfully to wring."

Two IIA employees testified that they had prevented State Department officials from suspending Hebrew-language broadcasts to Israel in 1952 and 1953, when it was important to attack Soviet anti-semitism. Harris explained it as a budget decision based on the ineffectiveness of the service and that the decision was suspended only to allow a new administration to make the decision after taking office in 1953. Others charged that several IIA employees received important posts despite failing security tests, including Theodore Kaghan, Ed Schechter and Charles Lewis.

Some of Harris' testimony was televised, but the American Broadcasting Company (ABC) network aired only part of his rebuttal to McCarthy, even after Harris had complained of unfair coverage. ABC instead showed "a commercially-sponsored giveaway show" designed "to amuse the housewives", according to a New York Times writer, who wrote: "The episode showed more clearly than anything else how both Senator McCarthy and television are putting show business considerations above the minimum canons of fair play and responsible journalistic behavior....The tyranny of time is always a problem in broadcasting. But this tyranny must not be extended to a deadly serious inquiry where men's reputations are at stake and national policy is in the balance."

Harris resigned on April 14, 1953, effective April 24, saying he had planned to return to private business for a long time and had delayed doing so while he prepared a statement of his accomplishments and documentation of his loyalty through fifteen testimonial letters, which he sent to Sen. McCarthy's Subcommittee. In response, McCarthy said "resignation" was the wrong word to describe it, that it was "the best thing that has happened there in a very long time" and added: "I only hope that a lot of Mr. Harris' close friends will follow him out." IIA head Robert L. Johnson expressed regret at Harris' departure and wrote to him: "If I were you, I would be a very proud man today. So many of us are neophytes in the service of our country while you are completing seventeen years of devotion to the responsibilities of government."

For several years, Harris headed a Washington-based company called Publications Services Inc. In 1962, Edward R. Murrow, director of the United States Information Agency, the successor to the IIA now independent of the State Department, appointed him deputy director.

== Personal life ==
Harris married the former Martha Tellier of Cambridge, New York. They had three children.

Harris died on October 15, 1982, in Holy Cross Hospital in Silver Spring, Maryland. He had a heart ailment and Alzheimer's disease.
