= Alan Haber =

American activist (born 1936)

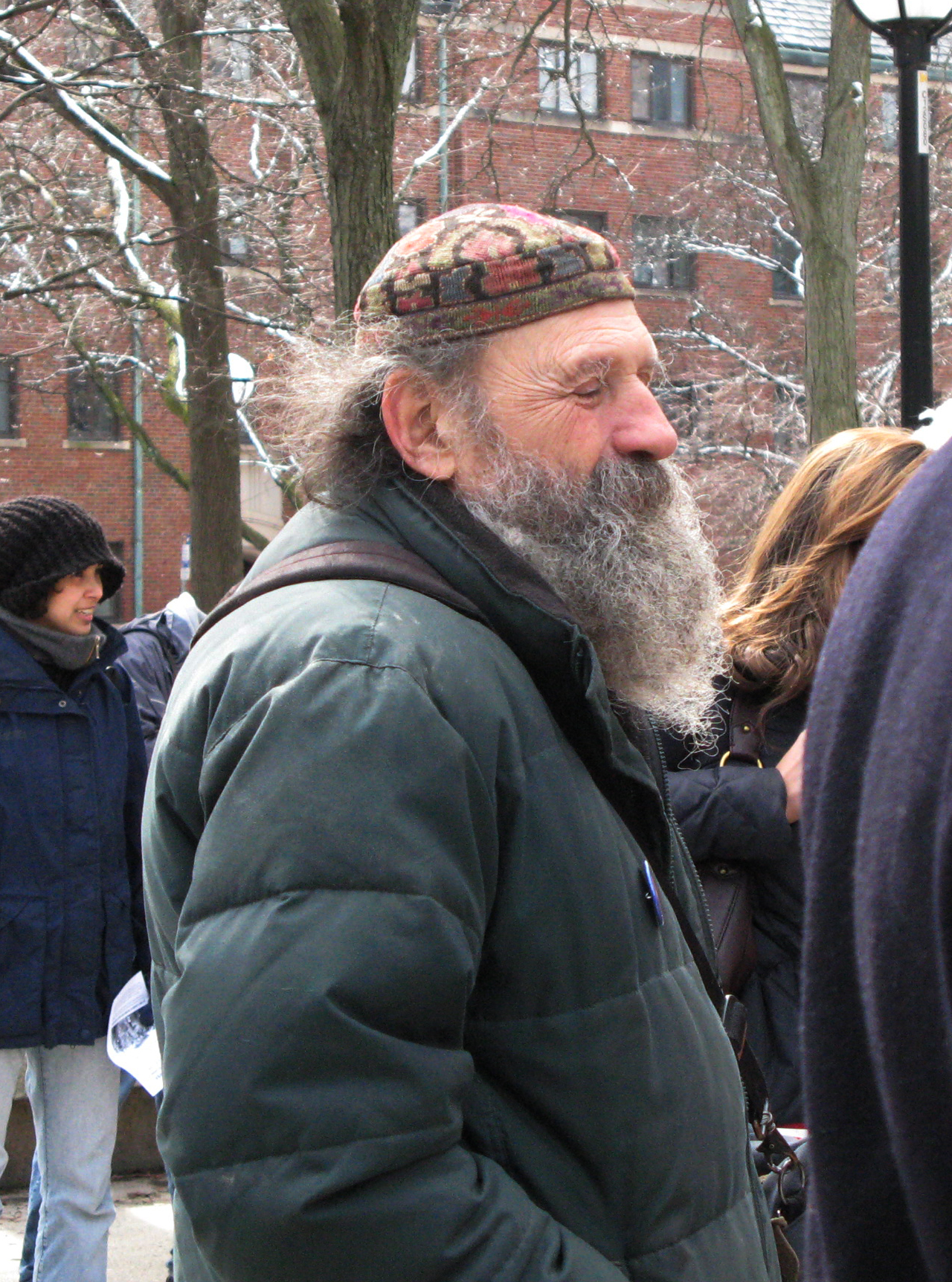
- Haber in 2007
- Born: July 29, 1936 (age 90)
- Education: University of Michigan (BA)
- Occupations: Activist; Cabinetmaker
- Known for: First president of Students for a Democratic Society

Robert Alan Haber (born July 29, 1936) is an American activist. In 1960 he was elected the first president of the now-defunct Students for a Democratic Society, a left-wing student activist organization. FBI files at the time indicated his official title as Field Secretary. Described variously at the time as "Ann Arbor's resident radical" and "reticent visionary", Haber organized a human rights conference in April of that year which "marked the debut of SDS" and invited four organizers of the 1960 NAACP sit-ins against segregated lunch counters in Greensboro, North Carolina.

== Early life and education ==
Haber "came from a leftist background". His father, William Haber, was an economics professor at the University of Michigan. Haber's parents named him after former Wisconsin governor, congressman and senator Robert M. La Follette Sr., advocate of the Wisconsin Idea political reforms in the late 19th century and early 20th century. Haber has one brother.

In 1954, Haber enrolled at the University of Michigan. He graduated in 1965.

== Activism ==
Haber, then head of the Radical Education Project, speaks to sit-in participants at the University of Michigan on 3 December 1966

Haber's political activism began in the mid-1950s. He worked unsuccessfully to bring concert singer and blacklisted political activist Paul Robeson to University of Michigan campus, protested the firing of three U-M professors for their refusal to sign a loyalty oath, and picketed Ann Arbor Woolworth’s and Kresge’s stores for refusing to serve African Americans in the Jim Crow south.

Haber attended the National Student Association convention in Minneapolis in August 1960. There he witnessed a dramatic intervention by Sandra Cason (Casey Hayden) urging support for the fledgling Student Non-Violent Coordinating Committee (SNCC). She recalls that Haber "scooped" her up for the SDS, and that she in turn drew in Tom Hayden, editor of the University of Michigan newspaper. While collaborating with Haber, Hayden was the principal author of the Port Huron Statement, refined and adopted at the first Students for a Democratic Society (SDS) convention in June 1962.

Haber was increasingly disaffected by the factionalism that marked the SDS as it mobilised on-campus opposition to the Vietnam War. By 1969, after Haber had moved to Berkeley, Calif., SDS splintered with the Weather Underground faction turning to violence. Haber regretted that the movement had "turned very hard edged."

Haber makes a living as a cabinetmaker.

He helped found the Berkeley, California Long Haul Infoshop, an anarchist resource center and community space.

== Personal life ==
Haber lives in Ann Arbor, Michigan with his partner Odile Hugonot-Haber.
