= Intercollegiate League for Industrial Democracy =

- Abbreviation: ILID (1921–1933); SLID (1933–1935)
- Predecessor: Intercollegiate Socialist Society
- Merged into: American Student Union
- Successor: Student League for Industrial Democracy (1946)
- Formation: 1921
- Dissolved: 1935
- Type: Student activist organization
- Headquarters: New York City
- National Chairman: Maurice Newfield (1932)
- Parent organization: League for Industrial Democracy

The Intercollegiate League for Industrial Democracy (known from 1933 as the Student League for Industrial Democracy) was the official youth section of the League for Industrial Democracy and a de facto junior section of the Socialist Party of America during the 1920s and the first half of the 1930s. The organization merged with a student organization sponsored by the Communist Party, USA in 1935 to form the American Student Union.

== Organizational history ==
=== Background ===
In 1921 the Intercollegiate Socialist Society (ISS) was transformed into the League for Industrial Democracy (LID). With the change in name, the organization broadened its scope to become a more of a general educational society that included not only collegians and alumni, but also non-collegians in its ranks and activities. The organization continued to arrange campus lectures, as well as publishing pamphlets and off-campus speaking tours, but paid little attention to the organization of active campus groups. League student organizations continued at the University of Wisconsin, Columbia, Vassar, Yale, Harvard, the University of Texas, and elsewhere, but the emphasis of the national organization remained on building a non-campus movement in tangent with the Socialist Party.

By 1929 student members of the LID were outnumbered by non-student members. An Intercollegiate Student Council existed within the group to coordinate the activities of college students, but this was "poorly organized and somewhat inactive," according to historian Robert Cohen.

=== Depression era activity ===
The coming of the Great Depression had a radicalizing influence on many students, who saw world capitalism in a state of chaos. Members of the Intercollegiate LID energized by the 1932 Presidential campaign of Norman Thomas, as well as competition with the Communist-led National Student League.

In 1932 the student members of the LID held their own national convention which abolished the old Intercollegiate Student Council of the LID and elected instead a new National Executive Committee and national chairman, Maurice Newfield.

The new independent organization began to issue a new national magazine, Revolt, (later named Student Outlook) and in 1933 formally adopted for itself the name "Student League for Industrial Democracy" (SLID).

Between 1933 and 1935 SLID participated in protests over violations of student free speech, the reception of a "good will tour" of students from Fascist Italy, the Italian invasion of Ethiopia and instances of racial discrimination, often in conjunction with the Communist Party-led National Student League (NSL).

One of the group's most dramatic activities was organizing the National Student Strike Against War on April 13, 1934 and 1935, commemorating American entry into the First World War. The first strike, coordinated only with the NSL, drew 25,000 students nationwide, 15,000 of which were in New York City. The second demonstration however, in April 1935, drew 175,000 students, 160,000 outside of New York, and was co-sponsored by the National Student Federation of America, the National Council of Methodist Youth, YMCA, YWCA, the Interseminary Movement, the youth section of the American League Against War and Fascism, among others. An important aspect of the two annual strikes was an Americanized version of the Oxford Pledge, in which students pledged "We will not support the government of the United States in any war it may conduct."

=== Principles ===
The Student League for Industrial Democracy proclaimed its goal to be the establishment of "a classless cooperative society in which men will have an equal opportunity to achieve the good things of life." It took a Fabian approach to this long-term objective, advocating a minimum program which included the organization of labor, expansion of merit-based academic scholarships, defense of civil liberties and academic freedom, and opposition to "any manifestation of militarism in education, especially the R.O.T.C."

=== Merger ===
With the Student League for Industrial Democracy and the Communist-led National Student League working together so often, there arose sentiment in favor of amalgamating the two organizations. The NSL proposed this first in December 1933, and again the next year. The leadership of the SLID, however, was weary of the NSL uncritical view of the Soviet Union and less than democratic nature of the NSL.

Due to the unprecedented size of the April 1935 student strike, however, pressure from within the SLID ranks became difficult for its more cautious leadership to contain. This was especially true on the West Coast, were the local SLID members felt it that anti-fascist unity was a pressing need in the wake of a local red scare. With its California chapters already planning an amalgamation conference for the fall, in June 1935 the SLID National Executive Committee relented buy appointed a committee to discuss the merger with representatives from the NSL.

By October they arrived at an agreement to merge the two organizations at a convention that December into a new group to be named the American Student Union.

== Publications ==
- Joseph Lash The campus strikes against war New York: Student League for Industrial Democracy, 1935.
- Harold Lewack, Students in Revolt: The Story of the Intercollegiate League for Industrial Democracy. New York: League for Industrial Democracy, 1933.
- Kenneth Meiklejohn, Peter Raymond Nehemkis, Southern labor in revolt New York City: Intercollegiate Student Council of the League for Industrial Democracy, 1930.
- Proceedings of Annual Convention, Student League for Industrial Democracy : December 1934, Northwestern University. New York: The League, 1934.
- Italian intellectuals under fascism : facts and documents New York: The League, 1934.
- Handbook of the Student League for Industrial Democracy : history, program, organizational guide New York: The League, 1935.
