= American Student Union =

American student organization

- Abbreviation: ASU
- Formation: December 1935
- Dissolved: 1941
- Merger of: National Student League (NSL); Student League for Industrial Democracy (SLID)
- Type: Student activist organization
- Affiliations: American Youth Congress

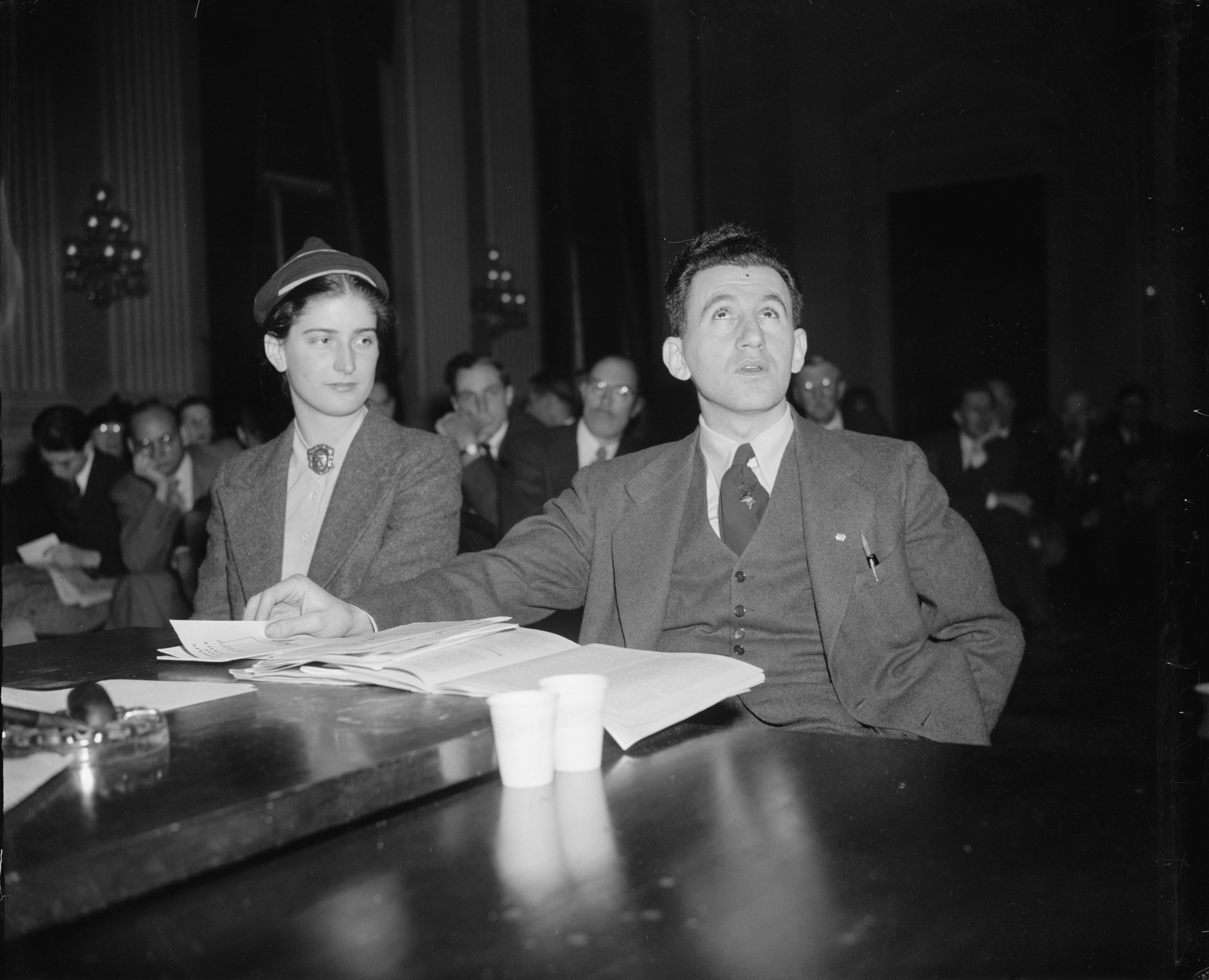
Agnes Reynolds and Joseph P. Lash of the American Student Union before the Dies Committee, 1939.

The American Student Union (ASU) was a national left-wing organization of college students of the 1930s, best remembered for its protest activities against militarism. Founded by a 1935 merger of Communist and Socialist student organizations, the ASU was affiliated with the American Youth Congress. The group was investigated by the Dies Committee of the United States House of Representatives in 1939 over its connections to the Communist Party USA. With the group's Communist-dominated leadership consistently supportive of the twists and turns of Soviet foreign policy, the Socialist minority split from the group in 1939. The organization was terminated in 1941 and reformed in 2022.

== Organizational history ==
=== Establishment ===
Following the rise of Adolf Hitler in Germany, the party line of the world communist movement was changed from the ultra-radicalism of the so-called "Third Period", which shrilly condemned Social Democrats as "Social Fascists", to a new phase of broad left wing cooperation known as the Popular Front. Efforts immediately followed on the part of the Communist-adjacent National Student League (NSL) to unite with its Socialist counterpart, which in the middle 1930s was effectively the Student League for Industrial Democracy (SLID).

Initial peace feelers extended by the Communists to the Socialists were rejected in December 1932, but with the European situation worsening two joint conferences of the rival left wing groups were held in 1933—one in Chicago under Communist auspices and another in New York City headed by the League for Industrial Democracy. The two groups decided to retain their separate existence but to work together on matters of common concern, which paved the way for several joint activities which took place in 1934 and the first half of 1935.

In June 1935 Joseph P. Lash of the SLID proposed at a meeting of the organization's governing National Executive Committee that the organization should appoint a committee to negotiate a formal merger with the NSL. The NEC of SLID was divided on the matter, but after extensive debate ultimately resolved to appoint a six-member negotiating committee.

Following negotiations between the two participating groups, a Unity Convention of the NSL and SLID was held over the Christmas holidays at the YMCA building in Columbus, Ohio. The American Student Union was thus born. Louis E. Burnham organized the first chapters to appear on black college campuses.

=== Change of line on pacifism ===
In January 1938 the third annual convention of the ASU, held at Vassar College in Poughkeepsie, New York, changed the position of the organization on war. Previously a pacifist organization which endorsed the so-called "Oxford Pledge" against conscription and militarism, the position of the ASU was brought into line with the foreign policy of the administration of Franklin D. Roosevelt, based upon the notion of collective security.

Some opponents of this change were livid and charged that the change was made by bloc voting by members of the Communist Party, as exemplified by the following passage from the press of Jay Lovestone's rival Independent Communist Labor League:

"At the outset, it was apparent to all that the Young Communist League controlled the convention in the form of a well-disciplined group, docile, responding to the guidance of the Stalinist wire-pullers. Every attempt on the part of the various advocates of the Oxford Pledge to introduce substitute motions or amendments, as is done in all parliamentary procedure, was efficiently squelched by the Stalinist chairman, with the help of his gloating compatriots on the floor."

The vote in favor of changing the political line of the organization on the war question was passed by a vote of 382 to 108.

=== Atrophy and dissolution ===
There was discord in the ASU over the organization's changing position to European armament after 1938, with the Socialist-oriented members generally favoring continuation of the organization's historic opposition to militarism and Communist-oriented members arguing in favor of rearmament and collective security in Europe. The break came the following year, however, with the November 1939 Soviet invasion of Finland. The ASU leadership, consisting by that time of a Communist majority, dutifully supported the military action of the Soviet Union, prompting the Socialist minority to split the organization.

The ASU continued forward as a more clearly defined Communist youth organization from that date and entered a period of organizational decline. The group held its final convention in 1941.

== Publications ==
- Toward a "Closed Shop" on the Campus. New York: American Student Union, 1936.
- The Campus: A Fortress of Democracy. New York: American Student Union, 1937.
- The Dismissal of Bob Burke: Heidelberg comes to Columbia. New York: American Student Union, 1938.
- Keep Democracy Working by Making It Serve Human Needs: Report of Proceedings of Fourth National Convention, American student Union, College of the City of New York, New York City, December 27–30, 1938. New YorK: American Student Union, 1939.
- The Student in the Post-Munich World. New York: American Student Union, 1939.
- Oberlin: The War Years. New York: American Student Union, 1940.
- "Twaddle," A Story in Pictures. New York American Student Union, 1940.
- ASU: Now We Are 6. New York: American Student Union, 1940.
