= Intercollegiate Socialist Society =

American socialist student organization (1905–1921)

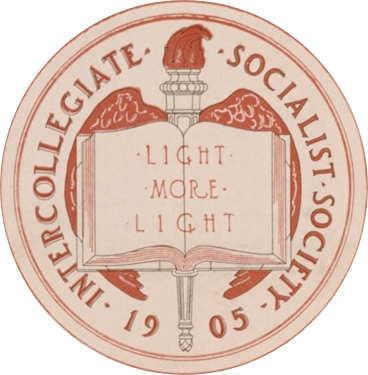
- Abbreviation: I.S.S.
- Successor: League for Industrial Democracy
- Formation: September 12, 1905; 121 years ago
- Founder: Upton Sinclair; Walter Lippmann; Clarence Darrow; Jack London
- Dissolved: 1921
- President: Jack London
- Vice-Presidents: Upton Sinclair; J. Graham Phelps Stokes

The Intercollegiate Socialist Society (ISS) was a socialist student organization active from 1905 to 1921. It attracted many prominent intellectuals and writers and acted as an unofficial student wing of the Socialist Party of America. The Society sponsored lecture tours, magazines, seminars and discussion circles all over the US to propagate socialist ideas among America's college population. The group expanded into a philosophy in the 1920s that did not focus exclusively or even primarily on college students. To symbolize the shift in emphasis, the group changed its name to the League for Industrial Democracy in 1921.

== History ==
=== Establishment ===
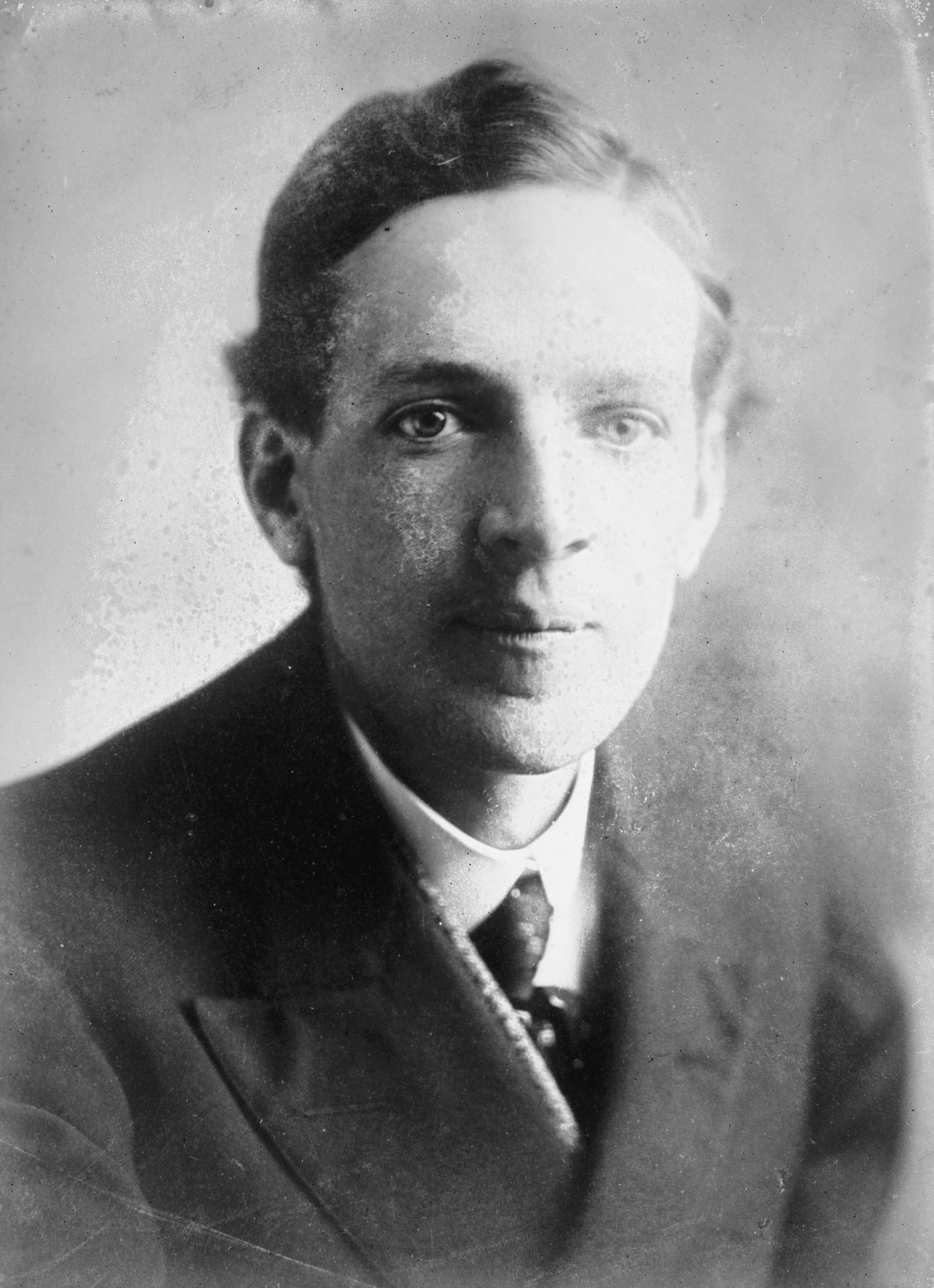
The Intercollegiate Socialist Society was the brainchild of left-wing novelist Upton Sinclair.

Supporters of the Socialist Party of America (SPA) were heartened by the results of the Presidential election of 1904, which saw the party's candidate, Eugene V. Debs, win approximately 400,000 votes. One supporter in particular, novelist Upton Sinclair, was motivated to help advance the socialist idea among the political leaders of tomorrow by establishing a new organization targeted at college students. Sinclair made contact with a number of leading public intellectuals of the day, gaining formal endorsements for a new national college socialist organization from a number of important figures, including novelist Jack London, millionaire financier James Graham Phelps Stokes, socialist republican William English Walling, magazine publisher B. O. Flower, attorney Clarence Darrow, writer Charlotte Perkins Gilman, publicist Leonard D. Abbott, abolitionist hero Thomas Wentworth Higginson, and Harry W. Laidler.

Over the signatures of these and other prominent public figures, in the Spring of 1905 Sinclair issued a call for the formation of a new organization, a group to be called the Intercollegiate Socialist Society. Their original call was written as follows:

In the opinion of the undersigned the recent remarkable increase in the Socialist vote in America should serve as an indication to the educated men and women in the country, that Socialism is a thing concerning which it is no longer wise to be indifferent. The undersigned, regarding its aims and fundamental principles with sympathy, and believing that in them will ultimately be found the remedy for many far-reaching economic evils, propose organizing an association, to be known as the Intercollegiate Socialist Society, for the purpose of promoting an intelligent interest in Socialism among college men, graduate and undergraduate, through the formation of study clubs in the colleges and universities, and the encouraging of all legitimate endeavors to awaken an interest in Socialism among the educated men and women of the country.

The new organization gathered for the first time shortly after the start of the new academic year, meeting on September 12, 1905, in a room at a restaurant in lower Manhattan. About one hundred supporters of the new organization attended this meeting, chaired by Sinclair, including a number of prominent socialist intellectuals. The gathering elected Jack London as the first president of the organization, Sinclair as first vice-president, and millionaire philanthropist J. Graham Phelps Stokes as second vice-president, with anti-child labor activist Owen R. Lovejoy chosen as treasurer.

The Intercollegiate Socialist Society set goals for its organization. It sought to promote an intelligent interest in Socialism among college men and women, familiarize students with the inherent evils of [the] American economic and social system based on laissez-faire policies, and promote the establishment of a socialist order.

=== Structure ===
Rules were laid down as to how to structure the collegiate chapters of the Intercollegiate Socialist Society, organizing students on each campus into individual chapters who would fund the central organization through a small percentage of their membership dues collected to the national Society. Chapters would appoint officers, consisting of a President, two Vice Presidents, a Secretary, and a Treasurer, who would be elected annually by the vote of the entire society. The Society's activities would be overseen by these appointed individuals along with six additional members who would form an Executive Committee.

=== Development ===
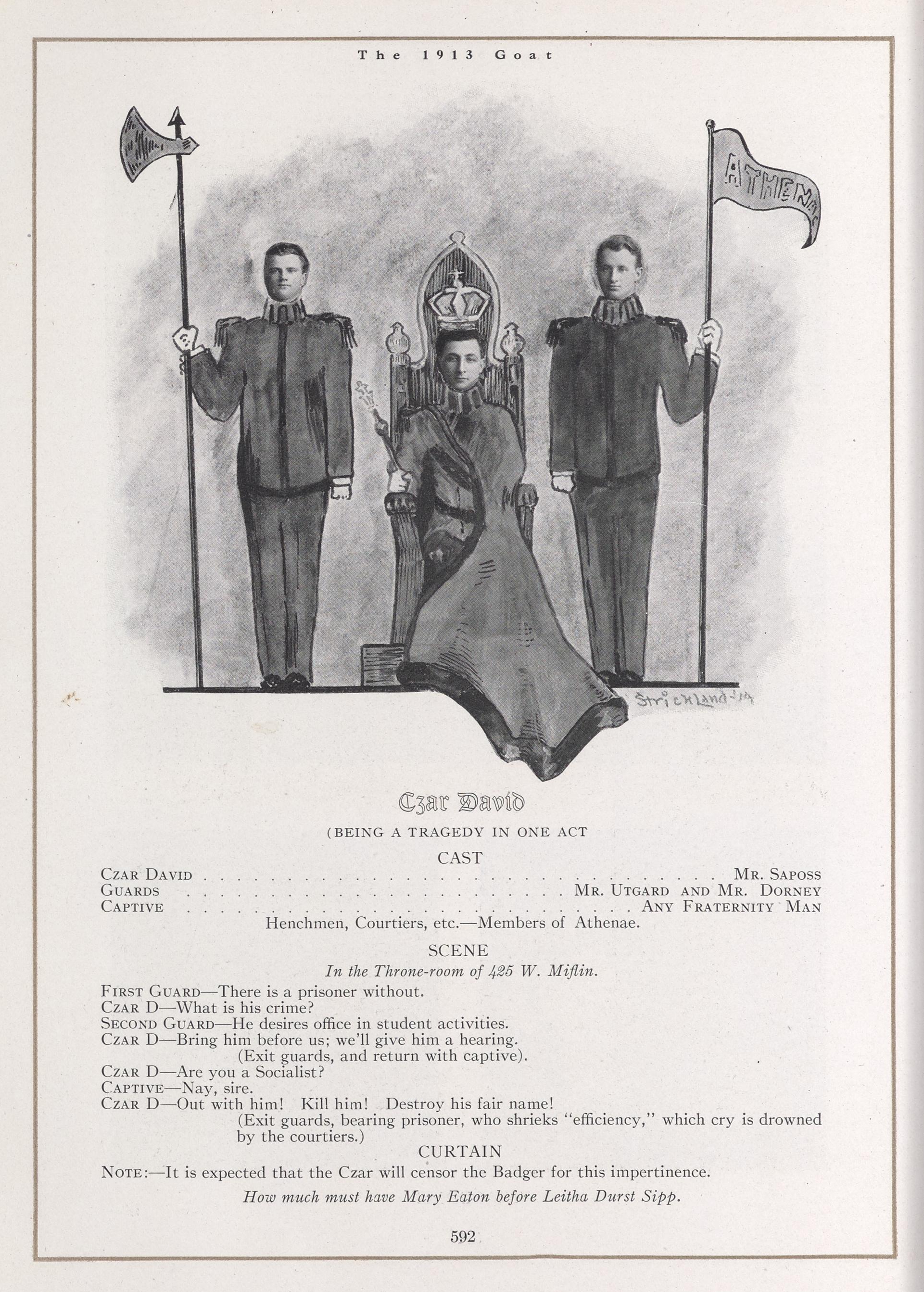
Czar David (Being a Tragedy in One Act), a satirical article making fun of David J. Saposs as chairman of the Socialist Club at the University of Wisconsin–Madison, 1913

The Intercollegiate Socialist Society organized slowly at first, as chapters were banned in most colleges and universities by conservative administrators who had the power to prohibit establishment of student organizations. Chapters slowly came to existence, frequently with names that did not signify its connection to the Intercollegiate Socialist Society at all, an example being the Wesleyan Social Study Club of Wesleyan University, which was one of the first collegiate organizations associated with the Intercollegiate Socialist Society as well as a chapter established at Columbia University.

Following these clubs, other affiliated socialist clubs were formed at Harvard University, Princeton, Barnard College, New York University Law School, and the University of Pennsylvania. The college socialist clubs discussed current issues as well as distributed socialist propaganda and arranged lectures on their campuses to try to get more support the socialist cause.

=== Transformation ===
In 1921, the Society recognized that socialism had become extremely unpopular in the United States after the violent Russian revolution. While its objectives to promote socialism in the United States didn't change, the name was changed to the League for Industrial Democracy. In 1960 the League gave birth to Students for a Democratic Society, the principal representation in the United States of the New Left.

== See also ==
- Young People's Socialist League (1907)
- League for Industrial Democracy
