= Jack Bergen =

American politician (1907–1992)

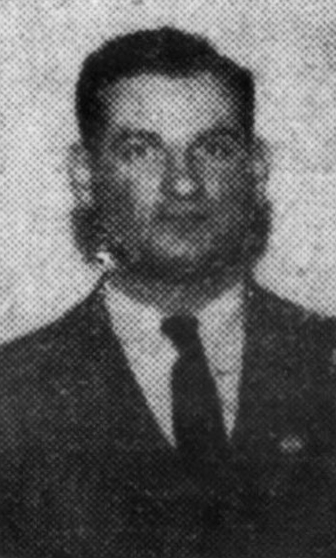
Bergen c. 1934

Jack Charles Bergen (January 17, 1907 – December 22, 1992) was an American politician based in Bridgeport, Connecticut. An active Socialist Party of America member (secretary of the local branch), he was elected to the city school board and in 1934 was elected to the Connecticut House of Representatives as part of the Socialist sweep of local elections under Mayor Jasper McLevy, while working as a Federal Emergency Relief Administration supervisor. He later broke with McLevy over the latter's decision to bolt the SP and join the Social Democratic Federation.
