= J. B. Matthews =

American political activist (1894–1966)

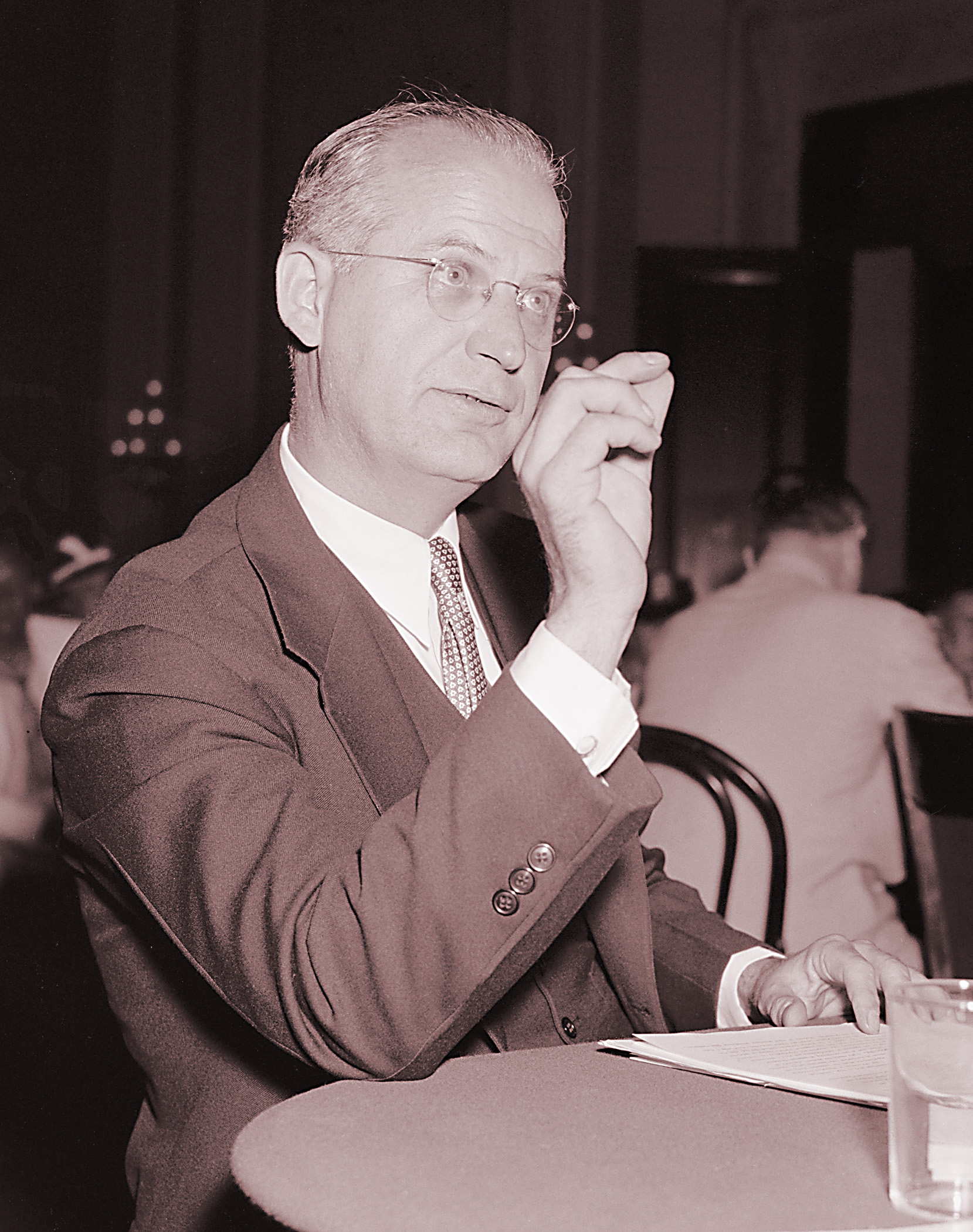
- Matthews testifying before the Dies Committee in 1938
- Born: Joseph Brown Matthews; June 28, 1894; Hopkinsville, Kentucky, US
- Died: July 16, 1966 (aged 72); New York City, New York, US
- Education: Asbury College; Drew University; Columbia University
- Spouses: Grace Ison (m. 1917); Ruth E. Shallcross (m. 1936); Ruth Inglis (m. 1949)

Joseph Brown "Doc" Matthews Sr. (1894–1966), best known as J. B. Matthews, was an American linguist, educator, writer, and political activist. A committed pacifist, he became a self-described "fellow traveler" of the Communist Party USA in the mid-1930s, achieving national prominence as a leader of a number of the party's so-called "mass organizations". Disillusionment with communism led to anti-communist testimony before the Dies Committee in 1938. He then served as chief investigator for the House Committee on Un-American Activities, headed by Martin Dies Jr., consultant on Communist affairs for the Hearst Corporation, and by June 1953 research director for Joseph McCarthy's Permanent Subcommittee on Investigations of the United States Senate. When Matthews published claims that the Protestant clergy comprised a base of support of the American Communist movement, he was forced to resign. This was regarded as McCarthy's first big defeat, signaling that his position was starting to weaken among his colleagues.

== Background ==
Joseph Brown Matthews was born on June 28, 1894, in Hopkinsville, Kentucky, of French Huguenot, Scottish, and English ancestry. Matthews' paternal grandfather was killed fighting for the Confederacy during the American Civil War, with his father subsequently orphaned shortly after the war and left to fend for himself at a very young age. He was raised as a fundamentalist Methodist. His father was the initiator of a local Sunday school that was serviced twice a month by one of the church's circuit riders. Matthews later recalled that the world-view of his early years was a simple one: "I knew nothing about class struggle, conscious race prejudice, economic royalists, or maladjusted personalities. Everything dark was simple as sin, and men needed only to repent and be saved in order to set everything right." In 1910, Matthews enrolled in Asbury College in Wilmore, Kentucky, from which he graduated in 1914. During these undergraduate years, Matthews majored in Greek and Latin, although he later recalled that he was more preoccupied with extra-curricular activities such as sports, music, debate, college publications, and literary societies.

Following graduation, Matthews spent six years in Java, part of today's Indonesia, where he taught in one of the Chinese Nationalist schools established there after the fall of the Manchu dynasty in 1911. Matthews saw this experience as pivotal for his own intellectual development, writing in his memoirs:

My real education began in Java. Java introduced me to ethnology, anthropology, the cultural pluralism of the race, the history and varied institutions of religions, and a serious study of languages.

While in Java, Matthews spent the bulk of his free time working seriously at linguistics, soon mastering the Javanese language. He became the editor of a Javanese-language newspaper while there, as well as editing the Methodist Hymnal into that language, contributing over 100 of his own translations.

Upon his return to the United States, Matthews enrolled in Drew University, a private United Methodist–affiliated institution in New Jersey, where he studied languages at the graduate level, including Arabic, Hebrew, Aramaic, Sanskrit, and Persian. During this interval, Matthews was influenced by the social gospel movement in American Christianity, which emphasized the application of Christian ethics towards the solution contemporary social problems. It was through this searching for answers to the social issues of the day, such as militarism, poverty, and racism, that Matthews was exposed to the ideas of political radicalism for the first time. In 1923, Matthews graduated from Drew with a Bachelor of Divinity degree. In 1924, he obtained a Master of Arts degree the next year at Columbia University in New York City. He also earned a Master of Theological Studies degree in 1924 from Union Theological Seminary, affiliated with Columbia, from which he graduated magna cum laude.

== Career ==
Following graduation, Matthews joined the faculty of Scarritt College, a Methodist training school for missionaries and Christian teachers located in Nashville, Tennessee. During this time, Matthews was active in the independent presidential campaign of Robert M. La Follette—a progressive labor-oriented challenge to the more conservative candidates of the Republican and Democratic parties. Matthews addressed crowds throughout Tennessee in 1924 as one of the La Follette campaign's leading public speakers. Throughout the 1920s, Matthews served on the faculty of an array of church-oriented institutes and training schools, usually established for a short period during the spring and summer months. During these brief stints in front of fresh audiences, Matthews attempted to expound his beliefs in pacifism and improved race relations. He was ultimately forced to leave his permanent teaching post because of a "furor over an interracial party held in his home, at which whites were reported to have danced with Negroes."

=== Activism ===
In 1928, Matthews was one of approximately 500 delegates to the first World Youth Peace Congress, held in the Netherlands. He was elected as chairman of the gathering and later earned plaudits for his efficient conduct of the group's sessions. While Matthews' support of the 1924 La Follette presidential bid marked his first formal left-wing political activity, his real political career began in the summer of 1929 when he was named one of two Executive Secretaries of the pacifist Fellowship of Reconciliation (FIR). Matthews continued to serve in this capacity until 1933. On November 6, 1929, Matthews joined the Socialist Party of America, effectively headed by Norman Thomas, himself a noted pacifist, former clergyman, and FIR associate He was a periodic contributor as a writer for the Socialist and pacifist press, publishing material in the New York weekly The New Leader and Norman Thomas's The World Tomorrow, (where Esther Shemitz, wife of Whittaker Chambers worked). Among other pacifist activities, Matthews served as the Secretary of the Pacifist Action Committee, treasurer of the Joint Peace Council, and on the executive committee of the Emergency Peace Committee in addition to being a member of the Interorganizational Council on Disarmament and the Peace Patriots. He also spoke periodically to such groups as the National Council for Prevention of War, the Fellowship of Youth for Peace, and the War Resisters League.

Matthews was involved in various trade union activities as well. He was a member of A. J. Muste's Conference for Progressive Political Action and a speaker at Muste's Brookwood Labor College and sat on the governing body of the National Committee Against Labor Racketeering. Matthews also was active in the fight against racism as a member of the National Association for the Advancement of Colored People and a speaker to the National Urban League. He advanced the cause of free speech through membership in the American Civil Liberties Union.

In 1932, Matthews stood as the Socialist Party's candidate for the New York State Assembly for a district located in Queens. He was an adherent of the Militant faction of the Socialist Party and was chairman of its Revolutionary Policy Committee and sat on the board of directors of the League for Industrial Democracy.

=== "Fellow traveler" ===
Matthews' association with the Socialist Party and its auxiliaries proved to be short-lived, however. In 1933, he was a speaker at a rally at Madison Square Garden sponsored by the United States Communist Party as part of its united front campaign, action which led to a reprimand and eventually to the suspension of Matthews for "conduct unbecoming a member" of the Socialist Party. Thereafter, he moved increasingly into the Communist Party's orbit, although he later claimed never to have been an official member of the CPUSA. Thereafter, he was named the head of the American League Against War and Fascism, a mass organization of the Communist Party derided by detractors as a so-called "Communist front".

Matthews helped to launch the American Friends of the Chinese People (AFCP). He also served on the national committee of the American Youth Congress (AYC) and the National Student League (NSL), two of the Communist Party's efforts to make inroads with American students. Matthews was also a speaker for the Unemployed Leagues, the CPUSA-sponsored mass organization directed at the unemployed, International Labor Defense, the party's legal defense organization, and the Teachers' Anti-War Conference, as well was a member of the national committees of the National Tom Mooney Council of Action and the National Scottsboro Committee of Action.

Matthews visited the Soviet Union no fewer than five times during the late 1920s and early 1930s. He wrote extensively for the Communist press, contributing material to the Daily Worker (including a front page denial of the reality of the massive famine in Ukraine in 1932–33), Soviet Russia Today (edited by Jessica Smith, wife first of Harold Ware and then of John Abt), and The New Masses (whose editors included Whittaker Chambers.

Matthews' participation in organizations closely linked to the Communist Party led Richard Rovere to derisively describe Matthews as "the world's champion fellow traveler, joining Communist fronts as compulsively as a pie-eating champion eats pies," according to Richard Rovere.

Although conservative public intellectual William F. Buckley Jr. contended that J. B. Matthews himself coined the term "fellow traveler", in reality the phrase was an anglicization of a Russian word in common currency since the time of the Russian Revolution of 1917 — poputchik (literally: "one who walks the same path"). Regardless of this misconception of the phrase's origin, Matthews unquestionably helped popularize the term in so describing himself in the title of his repentant 1938 memoir.

=== Anti-communism ===
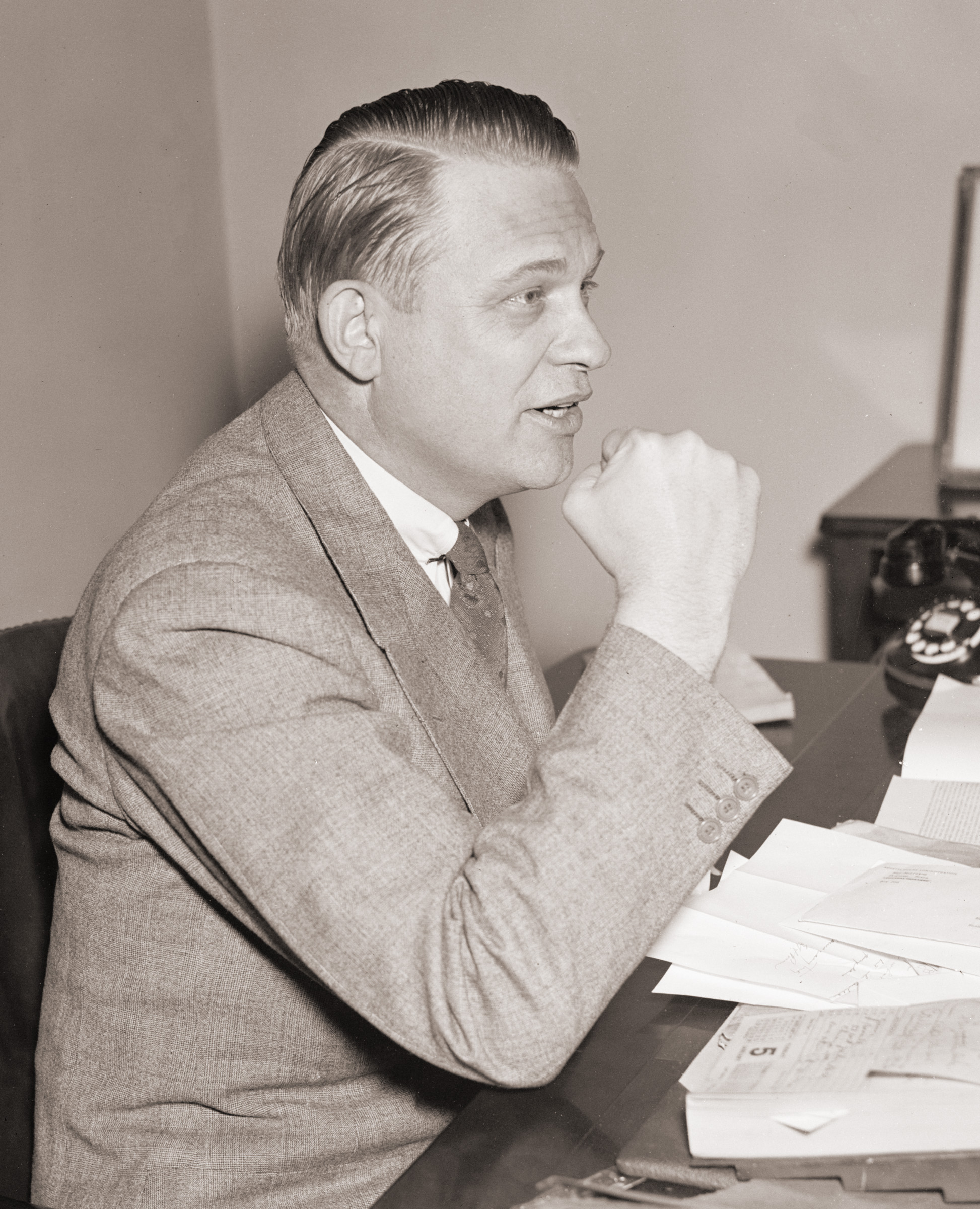
From 1938 to 1944, US Congressman Martin Dies Jr. headed a House Special Committee on Un-American Activities (AKA the "Dies Committee"), on which Matthews served as research director

Matthews became among the first anti-communist informers to testify before House Special Committee on Un-American Activities, commonly known as the Dies Committee. Matthews went on to become the research director for the Dies Committee, opening up a new career for him as a professional anti-communist investigator.

With the Dies Committee seemingly scheduled for termination in 1944, Matthews scrambled to preserve the material that he had compiled through an official committee publication. Over 2,100 pages were rushed to the printer and published in seven volumes, which together were known as Appendix IX of the committee's report. Appendix IX included a massive list of 22,000 names of individuals and their organizational connections to "subversive" organizations—many of whom were not themselves communist. Matthews was jubilant about his achievement, declaring Appendix IX to be "the most significant contribution ever made on the subject of communism."

The raw and undifferentiated nature of Matthews' Appendix IX, which listed communists alongside liberals and even centrists in a single list, led to a firestorm of criticism and a quick effort at the document's recall. The US Government Printing Office had already distributed a number of sets to members of the Dies Committee, government agencies, and private individuals, however, making the volume's complete suppression impossible. Appendix IX remains today a bibliographic rarity. He continued to work for the Committee on Un-American Activities until 1945, at which time he left to become a consultant for the Hearst Corporation.

Matthews became a symbol of the repentant former Communist who rendered expert service to the US government in its crackdown against what it perceived to be a network of underground subversion. In his column of October 6, 1947, syndicated columnist George Sokolsky wrote:

I have among my friends and acquaintances literally dozens of men and women who during the Hitler-Stalin Alliance were so ashamed of Soviet cynicism that from ardent Communists they became ardent anti-Communists. Such a man was Dr. J.B. Matthews, while never a Communist, was associated with that party as a fellow traveler ... In fighting Communists, our Government is absolutely dependent upon the ex-Communists ... If the government is seriously trying to tackle the Communist menace, then the first step is to employ qualified experts.... Amateurs can bring only discredit upon the government. Every effort should be made to ensure the cooperation and protection of friendly witnesses....

In 1947 the state of Washington established its own Joint Legislative Fact-Finding Committee on Un-American Activities, established on the model employed previously in California. This so-called "Canwell Committee" took aim at proving the radical connections of such local figures and institutions as Harry Bridges, the Seattle Labor School, the Seattle Repertory Playhouse, and various left-wing members of the faculty of the University of Washington. Matthews was among those national experts on communism brought into the state to give testimony before this committee.

In 1951, Matthews published an influential article in the American Legion Magazine entitled "Did the Movies Really Clean House?" in which he asserted that a large cadre of Communist Party members and sympathizers remained in the ranks of the movie industry. Matthews listed some 66 examples in his article, including names and the movie with which each was associated—effectively "graylisting" each.

=== McCarthyism ===
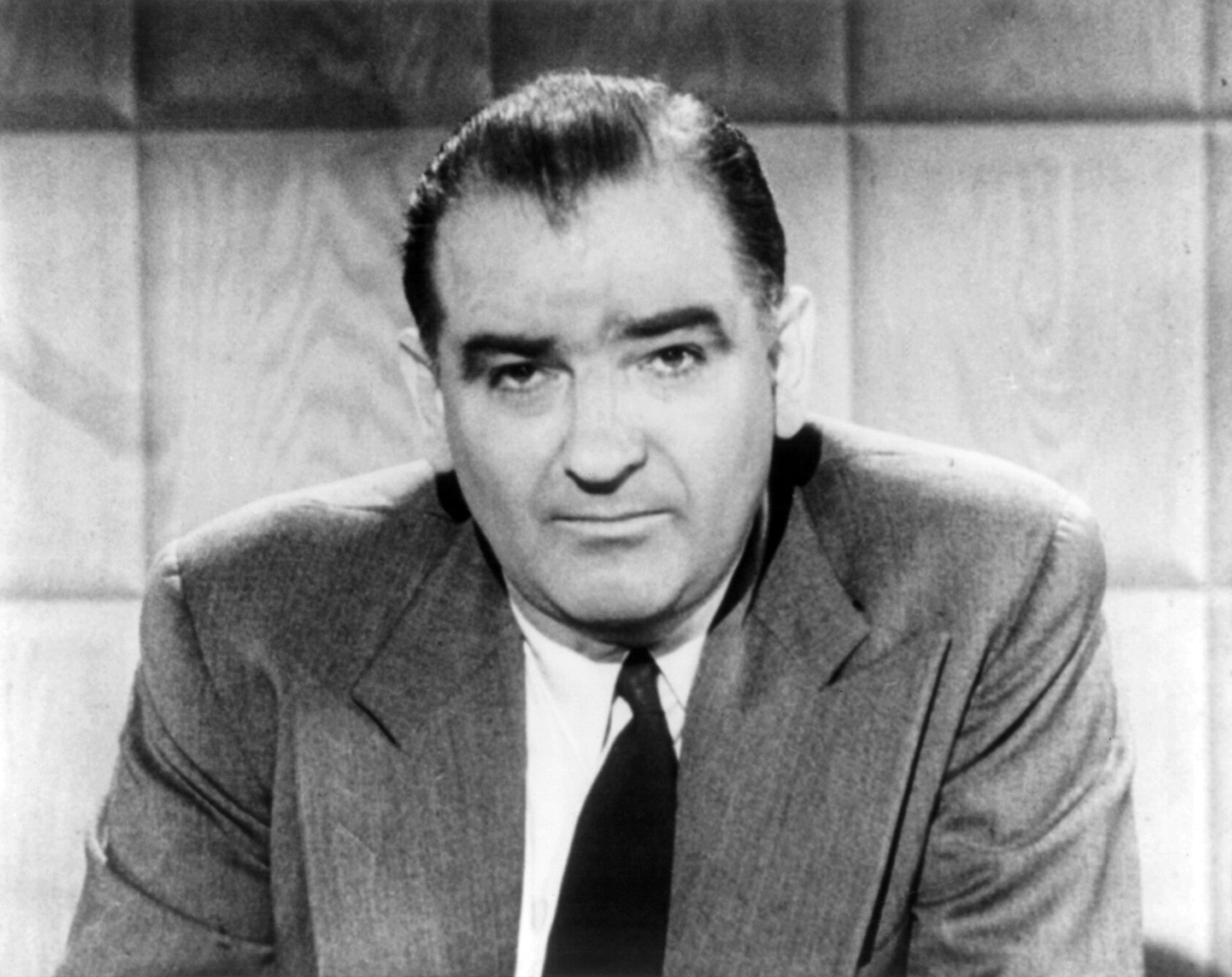
Senator Joseph McCarthy, Chairman of the Senate Committee on Government Operations

In June 1953, Matthews was appointed as research director to Senator Joseph McCarthy's Senate Committee on Government Operations and its Permanent Subcommittee on Investigations. The choice was a controversial one given Matthews' high-profile role in exposing Communists, which had made him a target of many on the left. The appointment to the McCarthy committee's staff coincidentally coincided with the appearance of a provocative article by Matthews in the July 1953 issue of The American Mercury, entitled "Reds in Our Churches". In this article, Matthews claimed "the largest single group supporting the Communist apparatus in the United States today is composed of Protestant clergymen."

One of the clergymen attacked was the Methodist bishop of Washington DC, G. Bromley Oxnam, a friend of Harry Byrd. The Senate Minority Leader Lyndon Johnson told Hubert Humphrey that attacking one of Byrd's friends would be the "beginning of the end for McCarthy. On the floor of the Senate Byrd demanded that Matthews "give names and facts to sustain his charges or stand convicted as a cheap demagogue. Other Southern Democrat members of the conservative coalition that controlled the Senate, such as Stennis and Maybank also attacked McCarthy.

These published charges enraged the ranking Democratic member of McCarthy's committee, Senator John McClellan of Arkansas, who together with his colleagues, Stuart Symington and Henry "Scoop" Jackson, marched into McCarthy's office and demanded that Matthews be fired. McCarthy refused and reiterated his support for Matthews.

The fight between Republican committee chair McCarthy and the Democrats over Matthews exploded into page one national news. Officials of the National Council of Churches, the United Lutheran Church, and the Southern Baptist Convention issued statements denouncing the Matthews appointment, and letters and telegrams opposing Matthews began to pour into congressional offices.

On July 7, 1953, the committee battled for 90 minutes over the appointment, with McCarthy refusing to back away from Matthews and claiming that he was a "non-professional" member of the staff that could be hired or fired at his sole discretion, while the Democratic minority cited the provisions of the Legislative Reorganization Act of 1946, which placed the hiring and firing of committee staff within the purview of the majority of the committee.

A deal was brokered by Vice President Richard M. Nixon, himself a veteran of the House Committee on Un-American Activities, in which Matthews would hand in his resignation in exchange for complete future authority for McCarthy to hire and fire committee staff. This arrangement proved acceptable to Democratic leaders and Matthews resignation was accepted on the evening of July 9, 1953. President Dwight D. Eisenhower released the contents of telegraphic communications with religious leaders to the press (e.g., The New York Times) in which the President acknowledged the validity of their criticism of Matthews' charges.

== Personal life and death ==
In 1917, Matthews married Grace Ison. In 1923, he married Ruth E. Shallcross. In 1949, he married Ruth Inglis. Inglis was a fellow consultant for the Hearst Corporation. She was treasurer, assistant publisher, and trustee of Consumers' Research. She was a professor of sociology at the University of Washington and research editor of Combat, a subsidiary of National Review. She helped launch Deadline Data on World Affairs and she was a staff member of the US House Committee on Internal Security.

Although he suffered from Parkinson's disease during his last years, which was reported as the cause of death in an obituary published in The New York Times, Matthews actually died of a brain tumor in New York City on July 16, 1966, aged 72. Matthews outlived his son, who he named after himself. On April 12, 1959, J. B. Matthews Jr. murdered his three teenage children with a baseball bat at their Springfield, Virginia home and seriously wounded his wife before killing himself with a knife.

== Legacy ==
Matthews' papers are housed in Durham, North Carolina, at the Duke University Rare Book, Manuscript, and Special Collections Library. The papers include a massive 479 linear feet of material, consisting of 307,000 individual items. An on-line finding aid is available.

Two additional accumulations of Matthews' papers may or may not be extant. In 1964, with his health in decline, Matthews left the employ of the Hearst organization and sold a substantial part of his files to the Church League of America based in Wheaton, Illinois, before passing to Jerry Falwell's Liberty University in Lynchburg, Virginia. This material may today currently reside at the Tamiment Institute at New York University. A further group of papers were sold to the Freedom Foundation of Valley Forge, Pennsylvania, in 1972: the whereabouts of this latter material remain unknown.

== Works ==
- Christianity The Way. Garden City, NY: Doubleday, Doran & Co., 1929.
- Youth Looks at World Peace: A Story of the First World Youth Peace Conference (The Netherlands, 1928). New York: American Committee World Youth Peace Congress, 1929.
- Traffic in Death: A Few Facts Concerning the International Munitions Industry. New York: League for Industrial Democracy, 1934.
- Fascism. With R.E. Shallcross. New York: League for Industrial Democracy, 1934.
- "Must America Go Fascist?" Harpers, June 1934, pp. 1–15.
- Partners in Plunder: The Cost of Business Dictatorship (with R.E. Shallcross). Washington, NJ: Consumers' Research, 1935.
- Guinea Pigs No More. Washington, NJ: Consumers' Research, 1936.
- Odyssey of a Fellow Traveler. New York: Mount Vernon Publishers, 1938. —Memoir.
- Doctor Matthews' amazing statement : before the Dies' Committee investigating un-American activities New York : American Immigration Conference Board
- Special Committee on Un-American Activities, House of Representatives, Investigation of Un-American Propaganda Activities in the United States: Appendix—Part IX, Communist Front Organizations, Second Section. Washington: US Government Printing Office, 1944.—Prepared by Matthews.
- "Did the Movies Really Clean House?" American Legion Magazine, December 1951, pgs. 12, 51–56, 93
- Tactics and Methods of Communism in America: A Harding College Freedom Forum Presentation. Searcy, AR: National Education Program, Harding College, n.d. [1952].
- "Communism and the Colleges", The American Mercury, May 1953, pgs. 111–4
- "Reds and Our Churches", The American Mercury, July 1953, pgs. 3–13
- "Moscow's Medicine Men," The American Mercury, October 1953, pgs. 58–62
- "Red Infiltration of Theological Seminaries", The American Mercury, November 1953, pgs. 31–6
- "Now They're for Stevenson", National Review, February 1956, pgs. 20–1.
- "Relief for America's Reds" American Legion Magazine, October 1957, pgs. 14–5, 43–6
- Communism and the NAACP. Atlanta: Georgia Commission on Education, n.d. [c. 1958]
