= Algernon Lee =

American socialist politician and educator

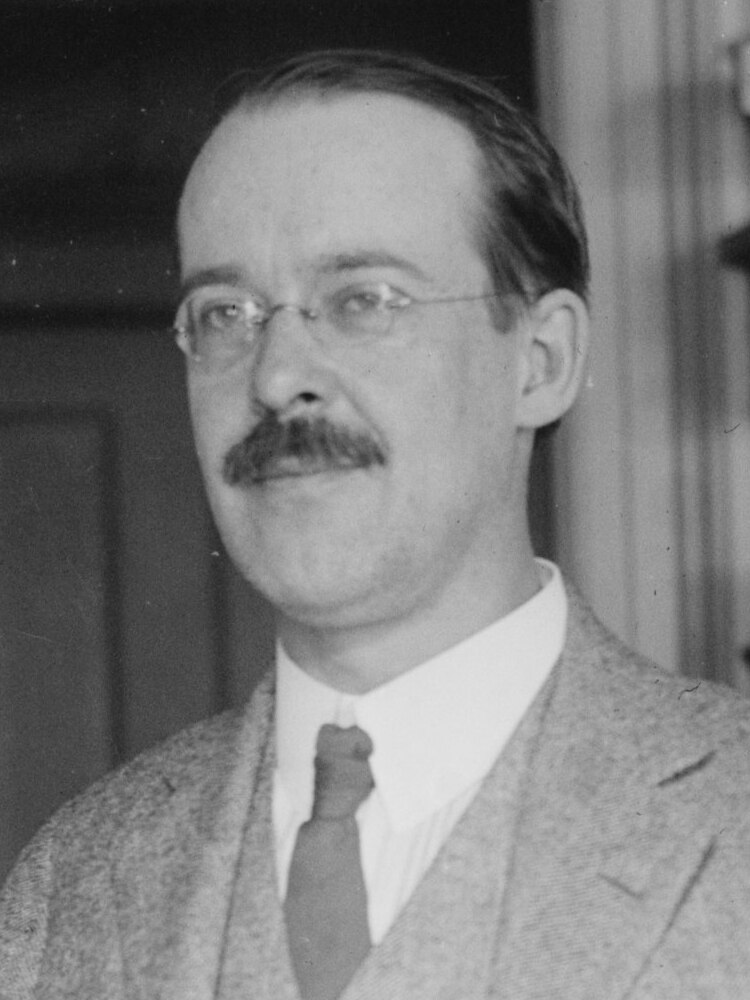
- Lee c. 1920

Member of the New York City Board of Aldermen from the 8th district
- In office November 3, 1921 – December 31, 1921
- In office January 1, 1918 – December 31, 1919

Personal details
- Born: September 15, 1873 Dubuque, Iowa, U.S.
- Died: January 5, 1954 (aged 80) Amityville, New York, U.S.
- Party: SLP (1895–1899); SDP (1899–1901); SPA (1901–1936); SDF (from 1936)
- Other political affiliations: American Labor Party; Liberal Party of New York
- Education: University of Minnesota
- Occupation: Politician, educator, journalist

Algernon H. Lee (September 15, 1873 – January 5, 1954) was an American socialist politician and educator. In addition to serving as a member of the New York City Council (then the New York City Board of Aldermen) during World War I, Lee was one of three co-authors of the controversial anti-war resolution at the 1917 St. Louis emergency convention of the Socialist Party of America. He is best remembered as the Director of Education at the Rand School of Social Science for 35 years.

== Biography ==
=== Early years ===
Algernon Lee was born September 15, 1873, in Dubuque, Iowa, the son of a millwright and carpenter. He was educated in public schools in Fishkill, New York, and Minneapolis, Minnesota.

Lee attended the University of Minnesota from 1892 through 1897. While a university student, Lee joined the Socialist Labor Party of America (SLP), first enrolling in the party's ranks in 1895.

=== Socialist journalist and educator ===
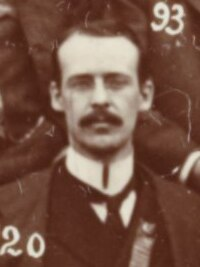
Lee at the first Socialist Party of America convention in Chicago, 1904

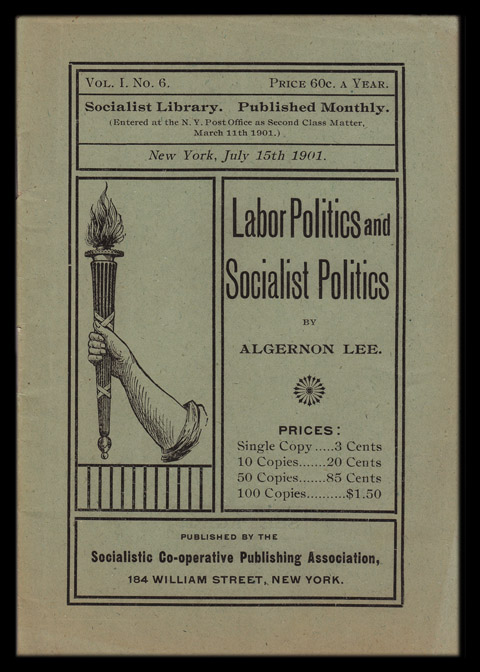
Cover of Algernon Lee's 1901 pamphlet, Labor Politics and Socialist Politics, published just prior to the formation of the Socialist Party of America.

Lee became the Minnesota State Secretary of the Socialist Labor Party in 1898 and he edited a socialist newspaper in Minneapolis called The Tocsin. He was not long in that role, however, as he chose to leave the party during the bitter party split of 1899, joining the so-called Springfield faction of the Social Democratic Party of America. Lee moved to New York City in 1899 to work as a paid editor of The Worker, continuing in that position with its successor, The New York Call, established in 1908.

Lee was a founding member of the Socialist Party of America (SPA), established in the summer of 1901 when the two organizations calling themselves the "Social Democratic Party" joined forces at a Unity Convention held in Indianapolis, Indiana.

Lee left The Call in 1909 to join the staff of the Rand School of Social Science, an educational institute closely linked to the SPA, as its Educational Director. Lee remained in this position for the rest of his life. In May 1920, he presided over the graduation of the second-largest class ever at Rand, whose members included: John J. Bardsley, William D. Bavelaar, Annie S. Buller, Louis Cohan, Harry A. Durlauf, Clara Friedman, Rebecca Goldberg, William Greenspoon, Isabella E. Hall, Ammon A. Hennsey, Hedwig Holmes, Annie Kronhardt, Anna P. Lee, Victoria Levinson, Elsie Lindenberg, Selma Melms, Hyman Neback, Bertha Ruvinsky, Celia Samorodin, Mae Schiff, Esther T. Shemitz, Nathan S. Spivak, Esther Silverman, Sophia Ruderman, and Clara Walters.

During the first two decades of the 20th century, Algernon Lee was recognized as one of the Socialist Party's leading members. He was a frequent delegate to socialist gatherings, both national and international. In addition to attending nearly every National Convention of the SPA, Lee was elected a delegate of the party to the 1904 Amsterdam Congress, the 1907 Stuttgart Congress and the 1916 Hague Congress of the Second International. Lee was also selected to join Victor L. Berger and Morris Hillquit as delegates of the SPA to a May 1917 general conference of Socialists held in Stockholm on the question of world peace, but was blocked from attending the gathering when the trio were refused passports to travel by Secretary of State Robert Lansing, who characterized the gathering as "a cleverly directed German war move."

Lee was a consistent opponent of American entry into World War I and he, together with his political co-thinker Morris Hillquit and future Communist leader C. E. Ruthenberg was one of three co-authors of the vigorously anti-militarist St. Louis resolution at the 1917 Emergency National Convention in that city.

Lee was also a delegate of the SPA to the 1922 Frankfurt Congress of the Labour and Socialist International.

=== Political campaigner ===
Lee was a frequent candidate for political office on the ticket of the Socialist Party. Candidate for Mayor of New York City in 1905. In 1909, he was a candidate for the New York State Assembly from the 6th District. Lee was elected a member of the New York City Board of Aldermen in 1917, serving one term from 1918 to 1919. He was narrowly defeated for re-election in 1919, but after a two-year recount process it was discovered he and one other Socialist, Edward F. Cassidy, had actually won. By the time they took their seats on November 3, 1921, their terms were almost over.

In 1916, Lee was the Socialist candidate for Governor of New York. He was twice a Socialist candidate for Congress: in the 14th District in 1920, and in 1926 in the 13th District. Lee also ran for U.S. Senator from New York in 1922. He was three times the Socialist Party's nominee for the New York State Senate, running in 1928 and 1930 in the 14th District, and in 1932 in the 17th District. Lee was also a delegate to New York convention to ratify the Twenty-first Amendment to the United States Constitution, which ended Prohibition, in 1933.

During the internal struggle which swept the Socialist Party during the second half of the 1930s, Lee sided with the so-called "Old Guard faction", headed prominently by Louis Waldman and James Oneal. He was a member of the "Provisional Executive Committee" of the Committee for the Preservation of the Socialist Party in 1934. Lee left the Socialist Party with his "Old Guard" comrades to help form the Social Democratic Federation (SDF) in 1936. Lee remained affiliated with the SDF for the rest of his life and also participated in the activities of the Liberal Party of New York.

From 1939 through 1948, Lee wrote and delivered a weekly radio broadcast on national and international affairs for the SDF's radio station, WEVD. In contrast to his anti-militarist position towards World War I, Lee was an active supporter of American entry into World War II and served on his local draft board.

=== Death and legacy ===
Algernon Lee died on January 5, 1954, in Amityville, New York, on Long Island. He was 80 years old at the time of his death.

== Works ==
- Lectures on the Development of Society. Minneapolis, MN: Socialist Educational Club, 1898.
- Labor Politics and Socialist Politics. New York: Socialistic Co-operative Publishing Association, July 1901.
- "Socialism in America" in American Almanac and Year Book, 1903. New York: New York American and Journal, Hearst's Chicago American, and San Francisco Examiner, 1903.
- A Study Course in Socialism. New York: Rand School of Social Science, Correspondence Dept., n.d. [c. 1913].
- "Tidings of the Times," Metropolitan Magazine, vol. 37, no. 5 (March 1913), pp. 56–57.
- Social History and Economics: Twenty-two Lessons. New York: Rand School of Social Science, Correspondence Dept., 1915.
- "Story of the Rand School" in Samuel Untermeyer et al., The Case of the Rand School. New York: Rand School of Social Science, 1919.
- The Essentials of Marx, including The Communist Manifesto and Wage-Labor and Capital; Value, Price and Profit and Other Selections. . Editor. New York: Vanguard Press, 1926. Reissued 1927, 1946.
- Issues Between the Parties. With Frederick Morgan Davenport and Lindsay Rogers. Chicago: University of Chicago Press, n.d. [1932].
- Debate: Should the United States Keep Out of Anti-Fascist War? With Harry Elmer Barnes. New York: Rand School of Social Science, 1939.
- On to Social Democracy! : "Rugged Individualism" Out of Date — Dictatorship even Worse than Capitalism — We Must Socialize our Democracy. New York: Social Democratic Federation, n.d. [c. 1940].
