= Edward Buckingham (disambiguation) =

Edward Buckingham (born 1948) was Attorney General of the Northern Mariana Islands from 2009 to 2012.

Edward Buckingham may also refer to:

- Edward T. Buckingham (1874–1942), mayor of Bridgeport, Connecticut
- Ed Buckingham (fl. 2007–2011), politician in Newfoundland and Labrador, Canada
- Eddie Buckingham, character in the Australian television show Neighbours
