= Myron Kolatch =

20th-century American magazine editor

- Born: September 26, 1929 (age 96)
- Occupation: Magazine editor
- Years active: 1953–2006
- Employer: The New Leader
- Predecessor: James Oneal, Sol Levitas

Myron Kolatch (born September 26, 1929) is an American magazine editor, who was managing editor and then executive editor of The New Leader from 1960 to its closure in 2006.

== Background ==
Kolatch was born on September 26, 1929, in the United States; his parents were also born in the US.

== Career ==
During the Korean War, Kolatch served in the United States Army (1951–1953).

In 1953, Kolatch joined the staff of The New Leader magazine (1923–2006), long run by Sol Levitas (who, among other things, was a member of the American Committee for Cultural Freedom). In 1957, he was an editor. In 1960, he became managing editor; in 1961, he became executive editor.

Assuming leadership of the magazine, Kolatch also inherited a scandal. The New Leader was co-publishing with Farrar Straus an anti-Communist book of essays. Book of the Month Club had selectedStrategy of Deception: A Study of Worldwide Communist Tactics, edited by Jeane J. Kirkpatrick. Then, it became known, the book had received secret funding from the United States Information Agency. Although Kirkpatrick was serving at the time as "consultant for various Government agencies," she claimed no knowledge of the secret funding.

Kolatch hired Diane Ravitch as a writer; other writers included Daniel Bell and Nathan Glazer. He also hired Stanley Edgar Hyman as book reviewer with a regular column called "Writers and Writing."

In 1963, TIME magazine describe the magazine as "a Manhattan-based biweekly with a circulation of only 28,500, wields influence out of all proportion to its size."

In 1965, the magazine received some funding from the Tamiment Library after the sale of its Tamiment camp.

Kolatch remained executive editor until the magazine's closure in 2006.

== Personal life ==
On politics, during a 2007 interview, Koltach said, "I have an uneasy feeling that Putin may be a twenty-first century variety of Stalin."

On publishing, during the same interview, Kolatch said:

Yes, there is and that is one of the reasons we did it as a PDF [on The New Leader website], so that you could print it and have it in your hand. Since I was a kid I was very interested in the whole growth and development of typography and moveable type, and I was in print shops, so I care a lot about graphic design. I care about the appearance of the magazine, and I don't want anybody messing with it.

== Works ==
After The New Leader's reportage on Yugoslavian writer Mihajlo Mihajlov landed him in 1964, Kolatch wrote a foreword to his book, published in 1966.

- Moscow Summer by Mihajlo Mihajlov with foreword by Myron Kolatch (1966)

== See also ==
- The New Leader
