= The New Leader =

American political and cultural magazine

- Former editors: Suzanne La Follette, Sol Levitas, James Oneal (founding editor)
- Categories: Politics and culture
- Frequency: bi-weekly
- First issue: 1924
- Final issue: 2006 (print); 2010 (digital)
- Company: American Labor Conference on International Affairs
- Country: USA
- Based in: New York, New York
- Language: English
- Website: Archived website
- ISSN: 0028-6044

The New Leader (1924–2010) was an American political and cultural magazine.

== History ==
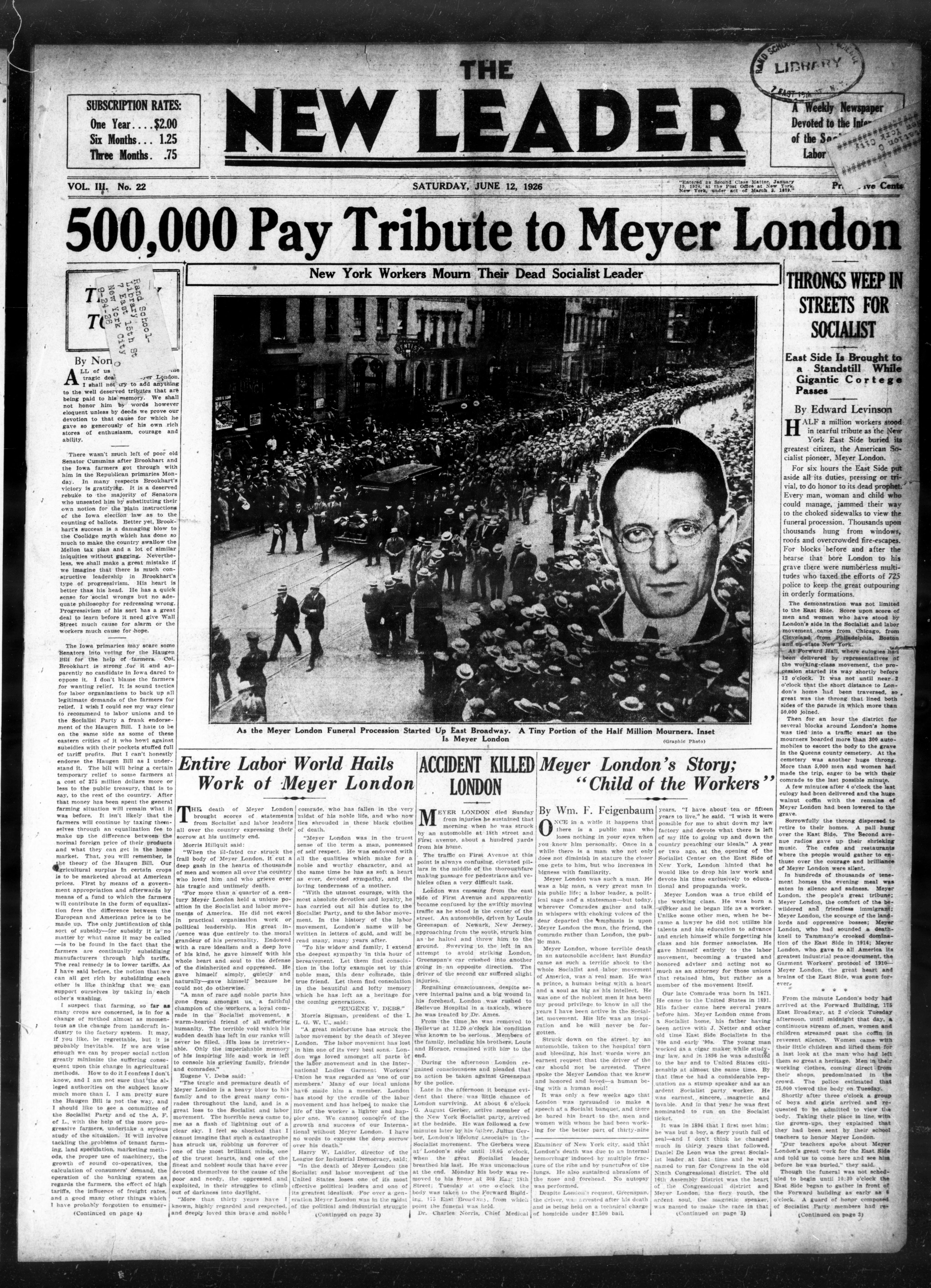
Front page of The New Leader, June 12, 1926, depicting the funeral of congressman Meyer London

The New Leader began in 1924 under a group of figures associated with the Socialist Party of America, such as Eugene V. Debs and Norman Thomas. It was published in New York City by the American Labor Conference on International Affairs. Its orientation was liberal and anti-communist. The Tamiment Institute was its primary supporter.

In its second decade, the magazine's overall politics shifted:

Under [Samuel "Sol"] Levitas's editorship, during years when the much-higher-circulation Nation and New Republic often ran acrobatic apologies for Stalin, The New Leader became a bi-weekly platform for what was then known as liberal anti-Communism.

== Editors ==
- 1924-1940: James Oneal, founding editor
- 1936-1960: Sol Levitas, managing editor
- 1940-1960: Sol Levitas, executive editor
  - 1945-1950: Liston M. Oak, managing editor
  - 1950-1960: Suzanne La Follette, managing editor
  - 1960-1961: Myron Kolatch, managing editor
- 1960-2006: Myron Kolatch, executive editor

== Contributors ==
Its contributors were prominent liberal thinkers and artists. The New Leader was the first to publish Joseph Brodsky and Aleksandr Solzhenitsyn in the United States. It was one of the first to publish Martin Luther King Jr.'s 1963 "Letter from Birmingham Jail". Other contributors, who were generally paid nothing or only a modest fee, included James Baldwin, Daniel Bell, Willy Brandt, David Dallin, Milovan Djilas, Theodore Draper, Max Eastman, Ralph Ellison, Sidney Hook, Hubert Humphrey, George F. Kennan, Murray Kempton, Irving Kristol, Melvin Lasky, Richard J. Margolis, Reuben Markham, Claude McKay, C. Wright Mills, Hans Morgenthau, Daniel Patrick Moynihan, Albert Murray, Ralph de Toledano, Reinhold Niebuhr, George Orwell, Bertrand Russell, Cyril Joad, Bayard Rustin, Arthur M. Schlesinger Jr. and Tony Sender.

== Closure ==
The New Leader ceased print publication after the January/April 2006 double issue. A bimonthly online version was published from January/February 2007 to May/June/July/August 2010.

Longtime Editor Myron Kolatch conducted an interview with Columbia University's The Current in 2007. He discussed the history of journals of ideas (The New Leader, Partisan Review, The New Republic, National Review) and their role in politics and intellectual discourse. Kolatch's "Who We Are and Where We Came From", adapted from the last print issue, covers some of the same topics.

== See also ==
- Anti-Stalinist left
- New York intellectuals
