= James Oneal =

American historian (1875–1962)

James J. Oneal
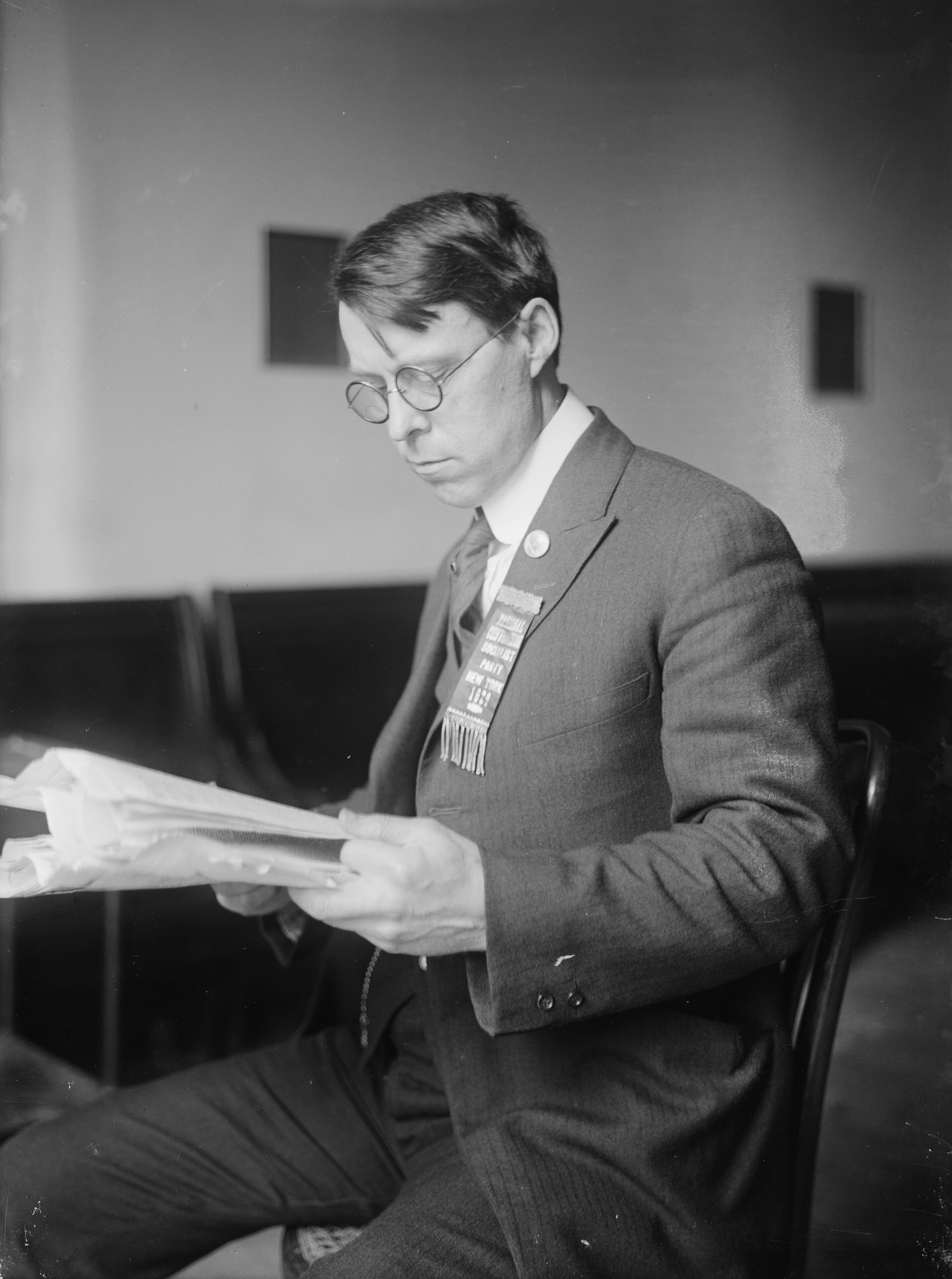
- Oneal in 1920

State Secretary of the Socialist Party of Massachusetts
- In office 1915–1917

State Secretary of the Socialist Party of Indiana
- In office 1911–1913
- In office 1901–1903

Personal details
- Born: March 13, 1875 Indianapolis, Indiana, U.S.
- Died: December 12, 1962 (aged 87) Seattle, Washington, U.S.
- Party: Socialist Labor (1895–1897); Social Democratic (1897–1901); Socialist (1901–1936); Social Democratic Federation (1936–1962)
- Occupation: Journalist, historian, activist

James J. Oneal (March 13, 1875 – December 12, 1962), a founding member of the Socialist Party of America (SPA), was a prominent socialist journalist, historian, and party activist who played a decisive role in the bitter party splits of 1919–21 and 1934–36.

== Early years ==
Oneal was born March 13, 1875, in Indianapolis, Indiana, the son of an iron worker. Upon the death of his father, Oneal was forced to leave school to go to work in a steel mill to help support his family. Oneal attended public school only to the 6th grade, relying instead upon self-education.

Oneal was an early convert to social democratic politics, joining the Socialist Labor Party of America in 1895 before leaving to join the Chicago-based Social Democratic Party of America (SDP) of Victor L. Berger and Eugene V. Debs shortly after its founding in 1897. Long a resident of Terre Haute, Indiana, Oneal was a close personal friend of his neighbor Debs.

Oneal was a delegate to the 1900 convention of the SDP and to the 1901 Unity Convention at which the Socialist Party of America (SPA) was born. He was also elected as the first State Secretary of the Socialist Party of Indiana, state affiliate of the SPA, shortly after establishment of the new party. The following year Oneal was elected to the governing National Committee of the SPA as the representative of the Socialist Party of Indiana.

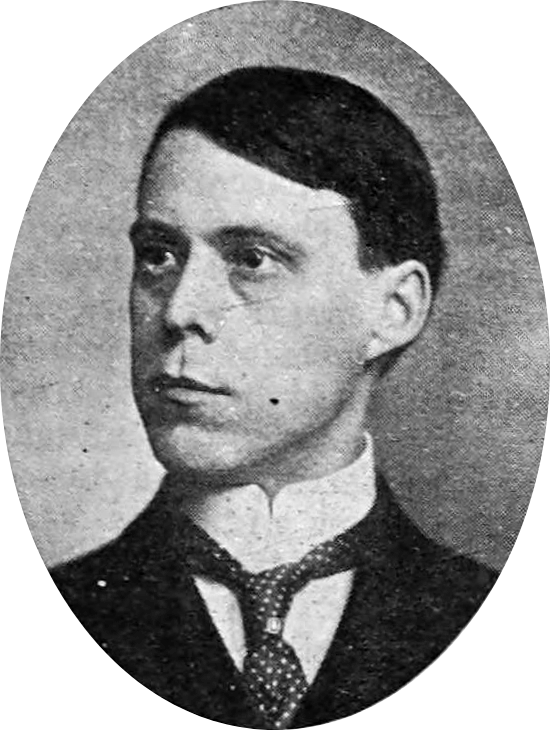
Oneal c. 1910

In 1903, Oneal moved to Omaha and went to work in the party's National Office as an assistant to Executive Secretary William Mailly. He continued in that role until 1905, at which time he left to become the Associate Editor of the New York Worker, forerunner of the great Socialist daily, the New York Call. After leaving the Worker in 1908, Oneal returned home to Indiana, where he was elected the State Secretary of the SP of Indiana from 1911 to 1913. By 1915, Oneal had relocated again, this time to Massachusetts, where he was elected State Secretary of that party in 1915, continuing in that post until 1917.

Oneal attended virtually every convention of the SPA as a delegate, including the seminal Emergency National Conventions of 1917, as a delegate from Massachusetts, and 1919, as a delegate from New York. Oneal also ran for office on the Socialist ticket, standing for President of the Brooklyn Board of Aldermen in 1919.

Oneal's main occupation in these years was that of Socialist journalist. From 1918 until the end of the publication in 1923, Oneal was the editorial writer for the SPA daily, the New York Call. In that role he was extremely influential during the factional party turmoil which erupted in 1919, a power made even more forceful when combined with the voice and vote which Oneal held on the party's governing 15 member National Executive Committee, to which he was elected in 1918. After the demise of the daily Call, Oneal was instrumental in starting its weekly successor, The New Leader, and he served as editor of that long-running publication from its establishment in 1924.

== 1919 controversy ==
Jim Oneal as he appeared in the official group photo of the 1919 Socialist Party National Convention.

The inner-party political situation during the war years has long been caricatured as a struggle between an ultra-revolutionary Left Wing and a "conservative" Right Wing. In actuality, the political views within the party's so-called Right Wing were more akin to a rainbow than a dichotomy. Perspectives among Party Regulars ranged from Christian socialism and tepid Sewer Socialism on the one hand to staunch support for the anti-militarist resolution adopted at the 1917 St. Louis emergency national convention and an earnest desire to initiate socialist society via the ballot box. James Oneal's own orientation in these years was closer to the latter pole, along with other main political leaders of the party, such as Eugene V. Debs, Morris Hillquit, Adolph Germer, and John M. Work. The true "Right Wing" of the party (exemplified by a large section of the publicists associate with the party, including Allan L. Benson, Charles Edward Russell, John Spargo, Emanuel Haldeman-Julius, and Carl D. Thompson) peeled away in 1917–18, as American participation in the European conflict became a reality and Woodrow Wilson's argument that this was indeed a "war to make the world safe for democracy" made converts.

As the war drew to a close, accentuated with a Bolshevik victory in Russia in November 1917, the revolutionary socialist Left Wing began to organize with a view to transforming the Socialist Party of America into a form better able to establish the dictatorship of the proletariat and a soviet form of government, but by September 1919 they had been expelled and became the Communist Labor Party of America under the direction of Alfred Wagenknecht and L.E. Katterfeld and the Communist Party of America headed by C. E. Ruthenberg.

== 1934-36 Old Guard controversy ==
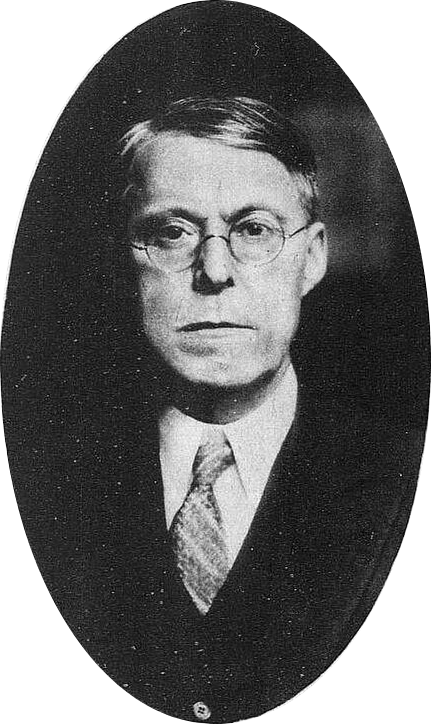
Oneal c. 1933

In 1934, Oneal played a role as a prominent member of the so-called "Old Guard" faction, which opposed the new Declaration of Principles passed by the party's Detroit Convention of 1934. Oneal used his positions as editor of The New Leader and official at the Rand School of Social Science effectively in bolstering the Old Guard's Committee for the Preservation of the Socialist Party, working with Chairman of the Socialist Party of New York Louis Waldman to lock up these party assets in the hands of his faction.

Oneal raised funds to publish a polemical pamphlet, issued under his own name in 1934, which took aim at his factional opponents. Oneal mocked the Thomasites as "'militant' liberals" capable only of winning the temporary allegiance of shallow college students, dismissed the Militant faction as "pseudo-Marxists and phrasemongers," and alleged that the Revolutionary Policy Committee (U.S.) were nothing more or less than practitioners of "Lovestone Communism" and were acting as a "dual organization in the party." He furthermore lambasted the League for Industrial Democracy, a bastion of the Thomas faction, as "a parasite on the Socialist Party and a dangerous dual organization" and specified instances in which the Thomas-dominated National Executive Committee of the SP had violated the party constitution.

Oneal's pamphlet included a coupon which readers could tear out, fill in, and mail to him, pledging the allegiance of the sender "as one with you for constructive party work and progress." The coupons accumulated doubtlessly proved invaluable as the Old Guard faction left the SP to establish itself as the Social Democratic Federation of America.

The Old Guard-dominated Socialist Party of New York was expelled en bloc by the National Executive Committee of the SPA in 1936 and Oneal and The New Leader followed. The New York organization originally reconstituted itself as the "People's Party," before becoming the New York state section of the Social Democratic Federation of America at a state convention held at the end of March 1937. A national convention to formally establish the SDF was scheduled for the end of May 1937, with Oneal named "Acting National Secretary" in the run up to this foundation meeting.

== Parting of ways with The New Leader ==
The relationship between the New Leader staff and the SDF political leadership was never completely cordial because of differing opinions as to editorial policy. While Editor Oneal was a strong SDF partisan but he clashed personally and philosophically with the publication's business manager, Sol Levitas, a former Menshevik vice mayor of Vladivostok. In December 1937, Levitas persuaded the paper's board of directors to change his title to "Executive Editor," a move which prompted a letter of resignation from the pugnacious Oneal. An uneasy truce continued between the two men, with Oneal working only 3 days a week owing to a slight stroke which he had suffered.

Finally, in the spring of 1940, the differing orientations of Oneal and Levitas came to a head. Oneal charged that the "secrecy, deception and direct sabotage" of Levitas were undermining his editorial authority. Levitas sought to water down the social democratic element of a publication to such an extent that "the reader will have to use very powerful glasses to find it." In April 1940, Oneal quit the publication for good, declaring that the paper had become a tepid liberal publication instead of a social democratic organ which worked to bolster the SDF organization.

== Death ==
Oneal died on December 12, 1962, in Seattle, Washington.

== Bibliography ==
=== Books and pamphlets ===
- The Workers in American History (2nd edition, 1910; expanded 3rd edition, 1912; 4th edition, 1921).
- Militant Socialism (1912).
- Sabotage, or, Socialism vs. Syndicalism. St. Louis, MO: National Rip-Saw, 1913.
- Labor and the Next War (1923).
- A History of the Amalgamated Ladies' Garment Cutters' Union, Local 10 (1927).
- American Communism: A Critical Analysis of Its Origins, Development and Programs (1927; revised and expanded edition with G.A. Werner, 1947).
- The Next Emancipation of Labor (1929).
- Labor's Politics. Chicago: Socialist Party of America, 1930. — leaflet
- Why Unions Go Smash! (1930).
- The Austrian Civil War (1934).
- Some Pages of Party History (1934).
- Socialism versus Bolshevism (1935).
- An American Labor Party: An Interpretation (1936).
- America's Responsibility (1942).
- Socialism's New Beginning. New York: Socialist Party-Social Democratic Federation, 1958.

=== Articles and leaflets ===
- "The Working Class," Missouri Socialist, vol. 1, no. 42 (Nov. 2, 1901), pg. 2.
- "The New Americanism," The Class Struggle [New York], vol. 2, no. 3 (May–June 1918), pp. 289–295.
- "'Left Wing' Convention is as Secret as Paris Conference," Milwaukee Leader, vol. 8, no. 186 (July 15, 1919), pg. 5.
- "Report to the National Convention of the Socialist Party of America by the Special 1919 Election Investigating Committee: Chicago, IL — Aug. 31, 1919," New York Call, vol. 12, no. 250 (Sept. 7, 1919).
- "The Communist Hoax," The American Mercury, vol. 1, no. 1 (Jan. 1924), pp. 79–84.
- "What is Our Socialist Duty?" The Socialist World [Chicago], vol. 5, no. 9 (September 1924), pp. 9–11.
- "The Communist Record," The Socialist World [Chicago], vol. 5, no. 10 (October 1924), pp. 3–4.
- "The Call of May Day," The Socialist World [Chicago], vol. 6, no. 5 (May 1925), pp. 7–8.
- "Eugene Debs and Socialist Party Policies," The New Leader [New York], November 13, 1926, pp. 3–4.
- "The Socialists in the War," The American Mercury, vol. 10, whole no. 40 (April 1927), pp. 418–426.
- Farmers! Your Enemy Is Capitalism: Your Friends Are the Working People Everywhere; Unite and Fight for Liberation! (n.d., 1930s).
