= Jasper McLevy =

American politician (1878–1962)

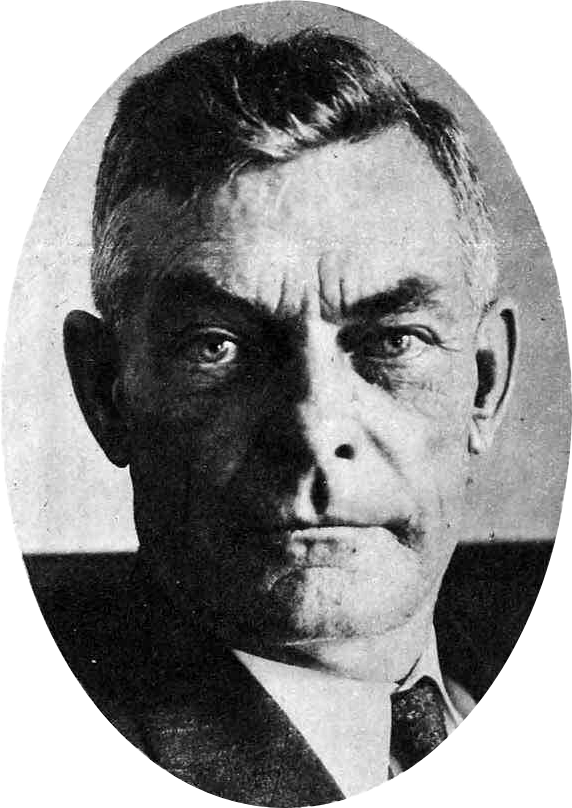
- McLevy c. 1939

43rd Mayor of Bridgeport, Connecticut
- In office November 13, 1933 – November 11, 1957
- Preceded by: Edward T. Buckingham
- Succeeded by: Samuel J. Tedesco

Personal details
- Born: March 27, 1878 Bridgeport, Connecticut, U.S.
- Died: November 20, 1962 (aged 84) Bridgeport, Connecticut, U.S.
- Party: Social Democratic Federation (after 1936); Socialist (until 1936)
- Spouses: Mary Flynn (m. 1912; died 1915); Vida Stearns (m. 1929)

Jasper McLevy (March 27, 1878 – November 20, 1962) was an American politician who served as mayor of Bridgeport, Connecticut, from 1933 until 1957. He was a member of the Socialist Party, later leaving in protest to join the Social Democratic Federation.

== Early years ==
Jasper McLevy was born to Scottish immigrants Hugh and Mary Stewart McLevy in Bridgeport on March 27, 1878. McLevy worked first as a roofer, learning the trade from his uncle after his own father died when he was 14. After reading Edward Bellamy's futuristic, utopian novel Looking Backward, he became a socialist, and helped form the Bridgeport Socialist Party in the early 1900s. The 24-year-old idealist first ran for the Connecticut General Assembly under the Socialist banner in 1902, collecting 215 votes. He ran another 20 unsuccessful campaigns for local, city, state and federal offices over the following years, including nine tries at mayor, the last in 1931. In all these races he ran as a Socialist at a time when socialists were portrayed as anarchists and bomb-throwers.

== Mayor of Bridgeport ==
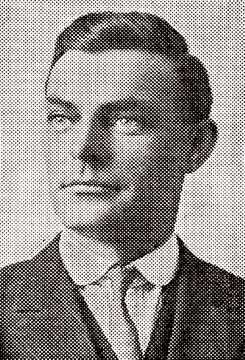
Portrait of Mayor Jasper McLevy from the 1936 convention program of the Socialist Party

In the early 1930s, Bridgeport, an industrial city in southern Connecticut, was plagued by corruption and hard hit by the Great Depression. In 1931, voters had ousted the incumbent Republican mayor for Democrat Edward Buckingham and McLevy only lost by a couple thousand votes. By 1933, dissatisfaction had spread to both parties and McLevy trounced the competition, bringing along a Socialist majority on the Board of Aldermen, Bridgeport's city council. While people familiar with local politics had seen the writing on the wall in the 1931 results, the national media was astonished to find the Socialists in control in a New England city.

Contrary to the fears of some, capital did not flee Bridgeport and McLevy began upon a reform agenda rather than a revolution. In a time of reduced revenue due to the Depression and, with city coffers depleted by corruption, McLevy managed to meet the city's obligations and balance the books, even reducing taxes. He withheld the lucrative contract for trash hauling, instituting municipal trash collection, saving the city hundreds of thousands of dollars. He took over Pleasure Beach where concessionaires had been reneging on taxes and rent for years. He began the process of putting all city purchases out for competitive bidding. In one instance when asphalt suppliers all supplied identical bids, he threatened to create a municipal asphalt supplier and broke their cartel. He championed transparency, opening all board and commission meetings to the press and the public ("Operation Goldfish Bowl"). He sold the expensive limousine his predecessor had used. He instituted a merit system in the police and fire departments. McLevy went on to be reelected eleven times.

While he was a Socialist, McLevy was known for his fiscal restraint. When asked, after a snow storm, when the city would begin plowing snow, McLevy allegedly replied, "God put the snow there, let him take it away." McLevy gained a reputation for balancing budgets, reducing spending and micromanaging city affairs. In the vernacular of the time, McLevy was referred to as a "sewer socialist", a pragmatist who focused on the details of running a city.

In the shadow of McLevy's victory, Bridgeport elected several Socialists to the state legislature in 1934.

Even though he was now residing in the mayor's office, McLevy continued to be a perennial candidate for higher office. In a 1938 gubernatorial campaign, he was called a spoiler when his votes made the difference in Republican Raymond E. Baldwin's ouster of incumbent Democrat Wilbur L. Cross.

In 1941, Wesleyan University awarded McLevy an honorary degree.

In 1957, after twenty-four years of service, McLevy was defeated in his bid for reelection as mayor by Samuel J. Tedesco. He ran again, unsuccessfully, in 1959, but finally retired from politics in 1960 due to illness.

== McLevy and the Socialists ==
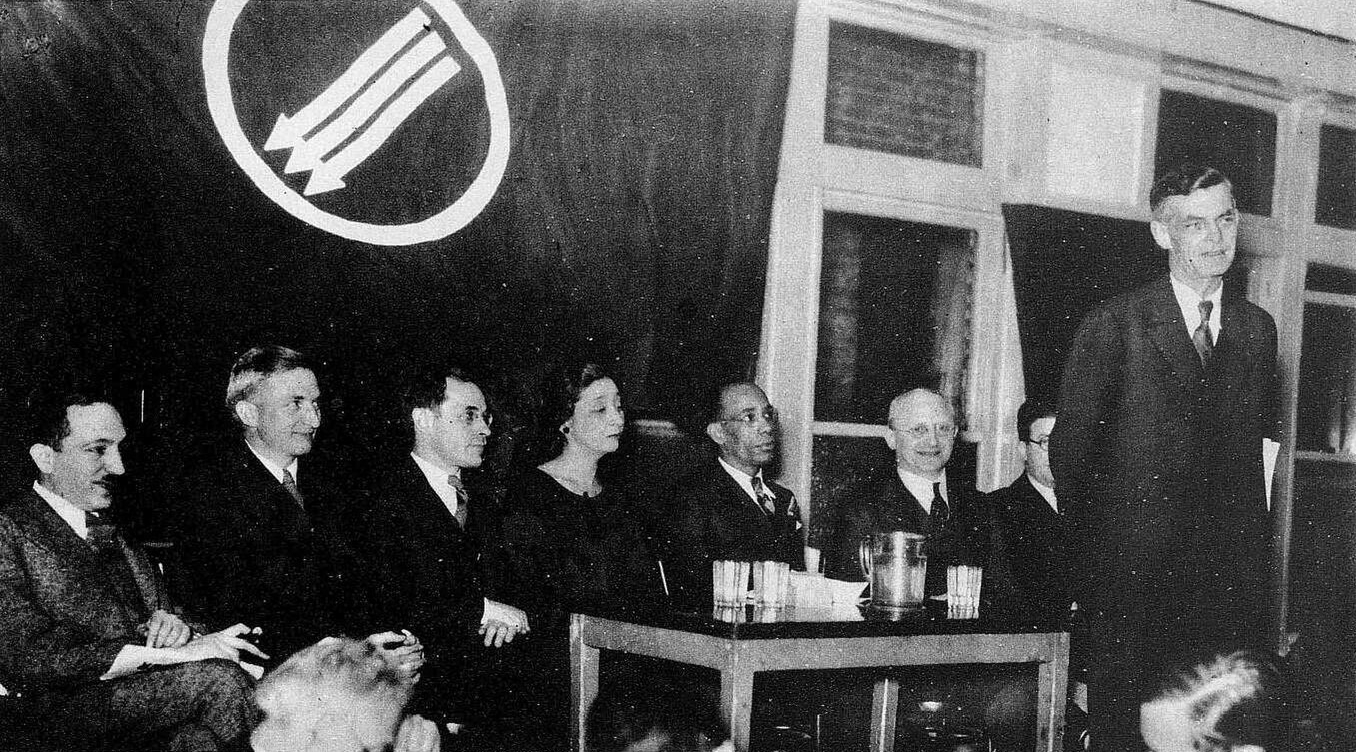
McLevy speaks at the opening of the Bronx Socialist Centre, November 1933. (Seated, L-R): Samuel Orr, Arnold Freese, Henry Fruchter, Gertrude W. Klein, Frank Crosswaith, George Steinhart, Matthew M. Levy.

As early as 1936, left-wing socialists, such as party leader Norman Thomas, accused McLevy, a member of the Old Guard, of paying only "lip service" to socialism. Ultimately, those disagreements led to McLevy taking the Connecticut Socialists out of the National Party briefly in 1938 and permanently in 1950.

McLevy was a member of the conservative wing of the Socialist Party. He was a member of the Provisional Executive Committee of the Committee for the Preservation of the Socialist Party, established in 1934 in response to the defeat of the Old Guard faction at the 1934 Convention of the Socialist Party in Detroit. When that faction lost in its bid to defeat the radical Declaration of Principles adopted in Detroit in referendum balloting of the SP's rank and file, the more conservative Party members broke away to form the Social Democratic Federation. McLevy joined them and disaffiliated his state party from the national Socialists. This caused friction between McLevy and other local Socialists who stayed with the party, including journalist Devere Allen, a close associate of party leader Norman Thomas, and state representative Jack Bergen.

== Death and legacy ==
McLevy died on November 20, 1962.

His papers are archived at the University of Bridgeport.

McLevy is remembered today as perhaps Bridgeport's second-most famous mayor (the first being P. T. Barnum). McLevy Hall and McLevy Green between Broad and Main Street at State Street are both named for Jasper McLevy.

In 1953 August Claessens, a close ally of McLevy and fellow member of the Social Democratic Federation, described the career and personality of Jasper McLevy as such in his book "Didn't We Have Fun!":

Jasper McLevy has been reelected to so many terms that one loses count. Definitely, Jasper was not elected and reelected because the Bridgeport citizens wanted socialism. McLevy's first election was a revolt against a shameless state of corruption and mismanagement cursing the city in which he lived. Jasper is an old, respected and familiar character in Bridgeport. A roofer by trade, a very simple and honest soul, a Scotch-man by lineage, he is noted for his canny shrewdness and sharp business sense. Jasper is also a grand mixer. There is not a civic or social function that he misses. He used to participate — I don't know if he is still able to get around — at every wedding, funeral, house warming and clambake — and go home sober. But his utter simplicity, his complete late of official pride and pomp, and his democratic disposition and good humor, endear him to every Bridgeport man and woman. It looks as if the old party opponents will defeat McLevy only by shooting him.

== See also ==
- List of elected socialist mayors in the United States
- Irving Freese, Socialist mayor of Norwalk, Connecticut, and Jasper McLevy's nephew by marriage.
