= Sol Levitas =

20th-century American magazine editor

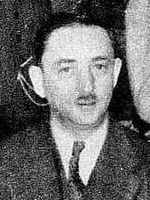
- Levitas in 1937
- Born: Samuel Moisewitch Levitas; 1894; Russian Empire
- Died: January 3, 1961 (aged 66–67); New York City, New York, U.S.
- Occupation: Magazine editor
- Years active: 1940-1950
- Employer: The New Leader
- Predecessor: James Oneal
- Successor: Myron Kolatch

Sol Levitas (1894–1961) was an American magazine editor, an "old-line Socialist" and "Russian refugee journalist" who served as managing editor of The New Leader (1940–1950) and "shaped the journal's character."

== Background ==
Sol Levitas was born Samuel Moisewitch Levitas in 1894 in the Russian Empire.

== Career ==
Levitas became a Socialist at age 15, became a Menshevik and close friend of Alexander Kerensky. In 1916, he first visited Chicago but returned home after the overthrow of the Romanov dynasty in February 1917. After the Bolshevik Revolution, he was imprisoned several times. In 1923, dressed as a Red Army colonel, he fled to New York City. He joined the Socialist Party of America and wrote for the Jewish Daily Forward and the Leader.

On January 19, 1924, the first issue of The New Leader hit newsstands. In 1930, Levitas became its business manager. In 1936, after years of infighting, editor James Oneal left Levitas in charge. In 1939, Levitas attacked the Molotov–Ribbentrop Pact. In 1943, he criticized Upton Sinclair for signing a petition in support of the Soviet Union. In 1945, Levitas criticized all accommodation with the USSR (e.g., the Yalta Conference). By 1949, the magazine was in dire financial straits. In 1950, Levitas said that "friends" were contributing to the magazine and in 1957 said that amount with $15,000 per year.

== Personal life and death ==
Levitas married Esther Fera. Their children were a daughter, Nora, and a son, Mitchel R. Levitas, New York Times editor and 1959 Nieman Fellow.

Levitas died age 66 on January 3, 1961, in New York City.

== Legacy ==
In 1960, former US Assistant Secretary of State and member of FDR's "Brain Trust, Adolf A. Berle, wrote that Levitas made The New Leader "a wellspring of first-hand information on foreign affairs." He noted, "In particular, he wished to prevent the crystallization into accepted history of untrue myths propagated by propaganda services."

In 1984, Sidney Hook and Arnold Beichman wrote that "what distinguished The New Leader, under Sol Levitas, from other publications was that its writers consistently involved themselves with other questions of the day, what Mr. Glazer felicitously calls the large areas of the public realm, such as technology, nuclear arms, ethnic relations, trade unionism and other issues."

== See also ==
- The New Leader
- James Oneal
- Myron Kolatch
