= Revolutionary Policy Committee (U.S.) =

The Revolutionary Policy Committee (RPC) was an offshoot of the so-called "Militant" faction in the Socialist Party of America during the middle-1930s. The group sought to transform the SP into a revolutionary socialist organization from its origins as a social democratic political party.

== History ==
=== Formation of the faction ===
The Revolutionary Policy Committee (RPC) was an organized far left faction in the Socialist Party's factional war of 1934 to 1937. While it shared the name and basic objectives of a similar faction in Great Britain established in 1931, the American RPC seems to have been launched only in April 1934. The RPC made itself known with the publication of a thin 12-page pamphlet entitled An Appeal to the Membership of the Socialist Party, a document which prominently featured the names and party positions of about 80 members of the Socialist Party. Prominent sponsors of the 1934 appeal to the membership included Roy Reuther of Detroit, as well as Franz Daniel, Mary Hillyer and J. B. Matthews of New York City, in addition to the National Industrial Organizer of the Young People's Socialist League, Joseph Zameres. According to James Oneal, Frances A. Henson acted as secretary of the faction during its initial phase.

According to historian Constance Ashton Myers, the Revolutionary Policy Committee was spearheaded by a "Lovestoneite infiltrator," Irving Brown. Chairman of the group was J.B. Matthews, a former Methodist missionary who would later become chief investigator for the House Committee on Un-American Activities headed by Martin Dies, Jr.

=== The 1934 Appeal to the Socialist Party ===
The RPC's Appeal was intended to reorient the Socialist Party towards revolutionary socialism from its previous parliamentary tradition. Capitalism was portrayed as a "collapsing structure," all efforts at disarmament "abortive," fascism victorious in Europe, and a "certainty of world catastrophe" imminent. The appeal declared

"The Socialist Party can become the effective instrument for bringing about Socialism only if it changes its present principles and tactics. The small growth in membership and the poor showing at the polls are objective evidence that the program and policies of the Party are not adequate. More important, however, the failure of social democracy to take power in Germany, where the Socialists had gained the support of large numbers of the working people, raises grave questions as to its theoretical soundness."

The RPC provocatively declared that it made "no fetish of legality" in exercising its desire to establish a "Workers' Republic." The April 1934 Appeal asserted:

"Once socialists are in possession of the state machinery by the mandate of the workers, their task is to secure and insure the governmental power for the victorious revolution by arming the workers for its defense against all possibility of a counter-revolutionary resistance, and to proceed to transform the economic and social basis of society."

The RPC demanded that the Socialist Party make "ceaseless efforts toward united action against common enemies" through "united fronts on specific issues." It was, however, highly critical of the Communist Party USA, declaring its so-called "united front from below" tactics had "been proven to be disruptive of the development of a revolutionary labor movement." To oppose this, it postulated that the Socialist Party take the lead in "counteracting these tactics" by "promoting united fronts of all working class organizations for struggle on specific political issues such as: political prisoners, race discrimination, impending war, dangers of fascism, etc."

The April 1934 Appeal also hailed the Soviet Union as the "land of proletarian dictatorship" and demanded that "the Socialist Party must pledge itself to defend the victories for Socialism which have been achieved in the USSR."

The 1934 Appeal was influential in steering the June 1934 Detroit Convention of the Socialist Party towards a radical new Declaration of Principles, a document ultimately written by Norman Thomas' associate Devere Allen.

The RPC proved to be the proverbial "red flag" to the SP's social democratic "Old Guard" faction, with James Oneal declaring its April 1934 Appeal to be "more definitely Communist than the Left wing manifesto which split the Socialist Party and out of which came two Communist parties." At the same time when the Old Guard was itself organizing itself as the Committee for the Preservation of the Socialist Party with an Executive Secretary, office, "Provisional Executive Committee," and mailing list, Oneal rather hysterically charged the RPC as being a "party within the party" and a "dual organization in the party!" "The RPC is Lovestone Communism," Oneal declared, noting that "the Lovestone organization is supporting the Communist elements in the Socialist Party." "Those who support the RPC program should join one of the four Communist sects," Oneal urged, "We cut out the cancer in 1919; there is no reason for us tolerating it in 1934."
