= The Current (magazine) =

Magazine from Columbia University

- Categories: Politics and culture
- Frequency: biannual
- Founded: 2005
- Country: United States
- Based in: New York City
- Language: English
- Website: www.columbia-current.org

The Current is a magazine of contemporary politics, culture, and Jewish affairs at Columbia University (New York, United States). Launched in December 2005 by Bari Weiss, The Current publishes essays and features on a broad range of subjects including Literary & Arts, Politics, and culture. There is also a Creative section in every issue.

The Current has conducted interviews with Muhammad Yunus, Stanley Fish, Myron Kolatch, Seyla Benhabib, Judith Butler, and others. Its editorials have addressed issues such as university speech codes, controversial campus speakers, corporate divestment, humanitarian activism, the Saffron Revolution in Burma, the history of the Student Struggle for Soviet Jewry, and various histories of racial and ethnic integration at Columbia University.
