= Social Democratic Federation (United States) =

American political party (1936–1956)

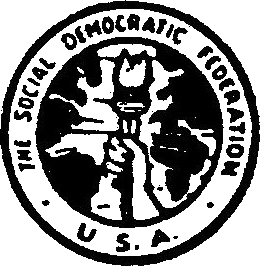
- Founded: 1936
- Dissolved: 1956
- Preceded by: CPSP
- Merged into: SPA (majority)
- Succeeded by: DSF (minority)
- Ideology: Social democracy
- Political position: Left-wing

The Social Democratic Federation of the United States of America (SDF) was a political party in the United States, formed in 1936 by the so-called "Old Guard" faction of the Socialist Party of America. The SDF later merged again with the Socialist Party in 1957 to form the Socialist Party-Social Democratic Federation (SP-SDF).

== History ==
=== Origins of split ===
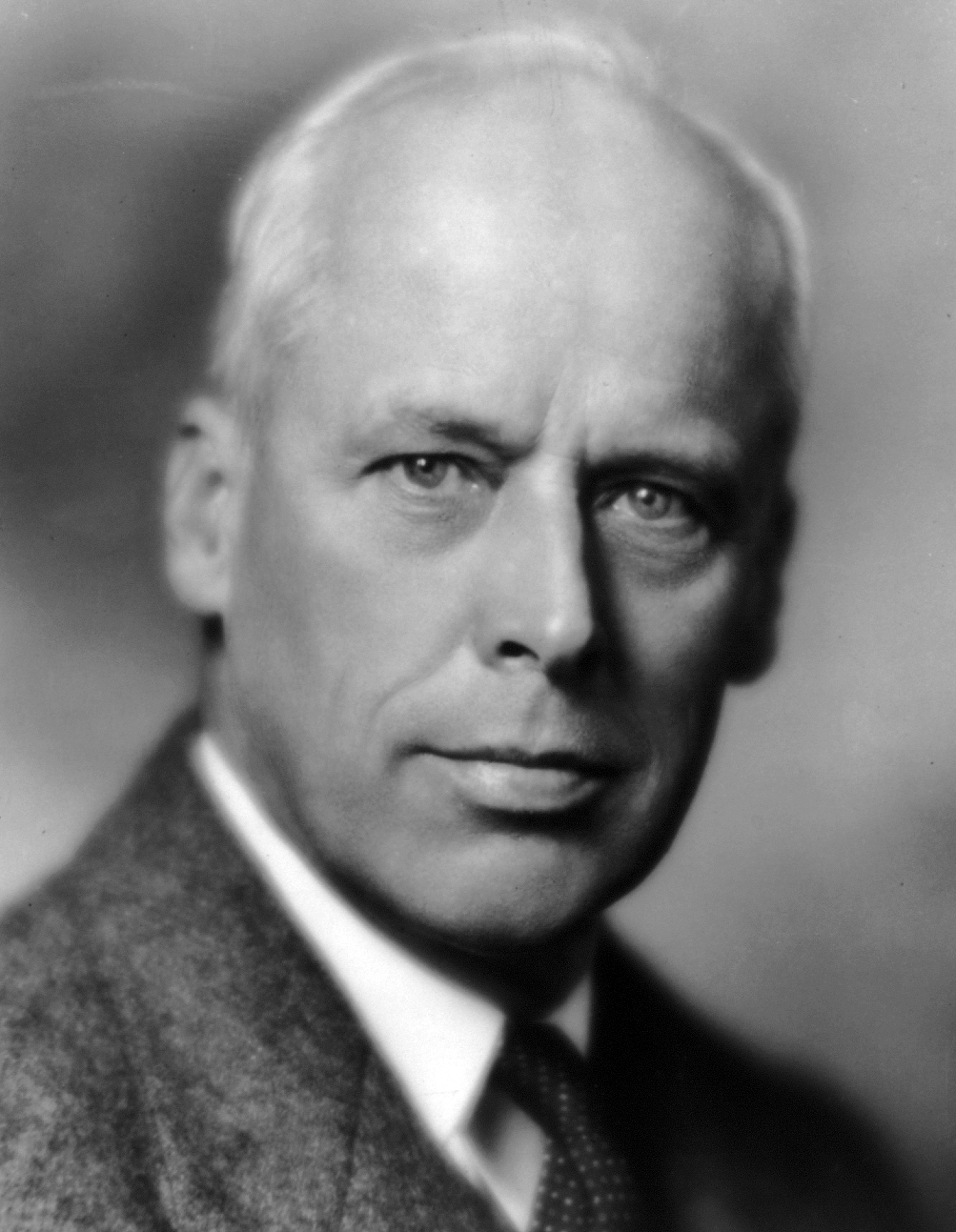
Norman Thomas c. 1937

Social Democratic Federation leader Louis Waldman noted in his memoirs that while the official split of the Socialist Party that resulted in the creation of the Social Democratic Federation took place in 1936, "the crucial events occurred at the party's national convention in Detroit in 1934." It was at this national gathering that the ongoing factional war between a youthful "Militant" faction favoring aggressive advocacy of revolutionary tactics and joint action with the Communist Party won the day and pushed through a new Declaration of Principles, leading the SPA's right wing faction, known as the "Old Guard" to abandon the organization. Throughout the 1930s the Socialist Party had achieved moderate growth, its paid membership returning to the 25,000 level and its candidate for President of the United States Norman Thomas polling nearly a million votes in the election of 1932.

Waldman recounted the main points of departure between the radical youth of the party and the staid older elements:

It all began with the formation of groups in the Socialist Party that wanted to commit it to direct action. "Direct action" means that an organized group will take any action, illegal as well as legal, that it believes will bring about the reform, changes, or objective it seeks. The general strike for political purposes, sabotage, the use of violence, the spread of fear, the paralysis of industry, trade, commerce, and even government are examples...
The direct-action groups in the Socialist Party called themselves Militants; some formed the Revolutionary Policy Committee; others used other names.
When they first appeared on the scene, they wore blue shirts and adopted the upraised arm and the clenched fist as a form of salute. They insisted that the party coin flamboyant slogans, organize street demonstrations, arrange great protest rallies, and in general, do the things that the Communists had made popular in their day-to-day activities. The Militants also proposed that, as the Communists had done, we form separate organizations for the unemployed, youth, tenants, and housewives, as if those groups had interests distinct from those of the workers as a whole...
In due time, organizations of students, youths, tenants, housewives, and the unemployed formed by the Socialist group entered United Fronts with like organizations under Communist auspices. The fronts became transmission belts for the Communists... Most of the fronts sought to carry out the objectives of Soviet foreign policy, to glorify the Soviet system, and to spread confusion in the ranks of society.
We were convinced that by engaging in United Front activities, we, who were opposed to Communist aims, would soon become witting or unwitting parties to the furtherance of those aims and to the destruction of democracy.

The National Executive Committee of the Socialist Party also established a department aimed to direct the activities of Socialists in the trade unions, a tactic which smacked of quasi-Communist tactics to the members of the Old Guard faction.

=== "Old Guard" splits ===
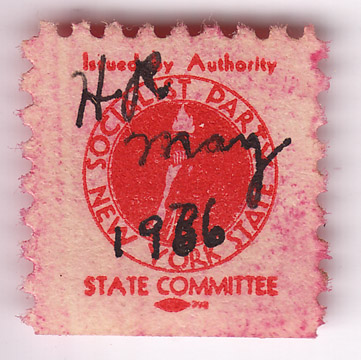
The Socialist Party of New York issued its own dues stamps for several months during the first half of 1936.

The "Old Guard" faction was further provoked by the adoption of a policy document known as the "Declaration of Principles" by the Socialist Party's 1934 national convention, held in Detroit. The 1934 Declaration of Principles was merely the result of a long process, in the view of the Old Guard leadership, its call for the "development of the dictatorship of workers and peasants" particularly galling to the faction's anti-communist sensibilities. In closing the debate on the matter for the Old Guard at the Detroit convention, New York state party chairman Waldman had condemned the Declaration in no uncertain terms, accusing the Declaration of advancing "dangerous, provocative proposals" which advanced an "anarchistic, illegal, Communist doctrine."

After the passage of the Declaration of Principles and the closing of the convention, the Old Guard returned home. On behalf of the Socialist Party of New York, chairman Waldman immediately issued a statement disavowing the actions of the Detroit convention:

We repudiate the essential features of the Declaration of Principles adopted at the Socialist National Convention insofar as they depart from the traditional socialist position and commit the Socialist Party to the use of violence and extralegal means.
As between the program of orderly, peaceable, constructive, and intelligent political action and the insurrectionary, destructive, and violent methods proposed by the left wing, Socialists will have no difficulty in making their choice."

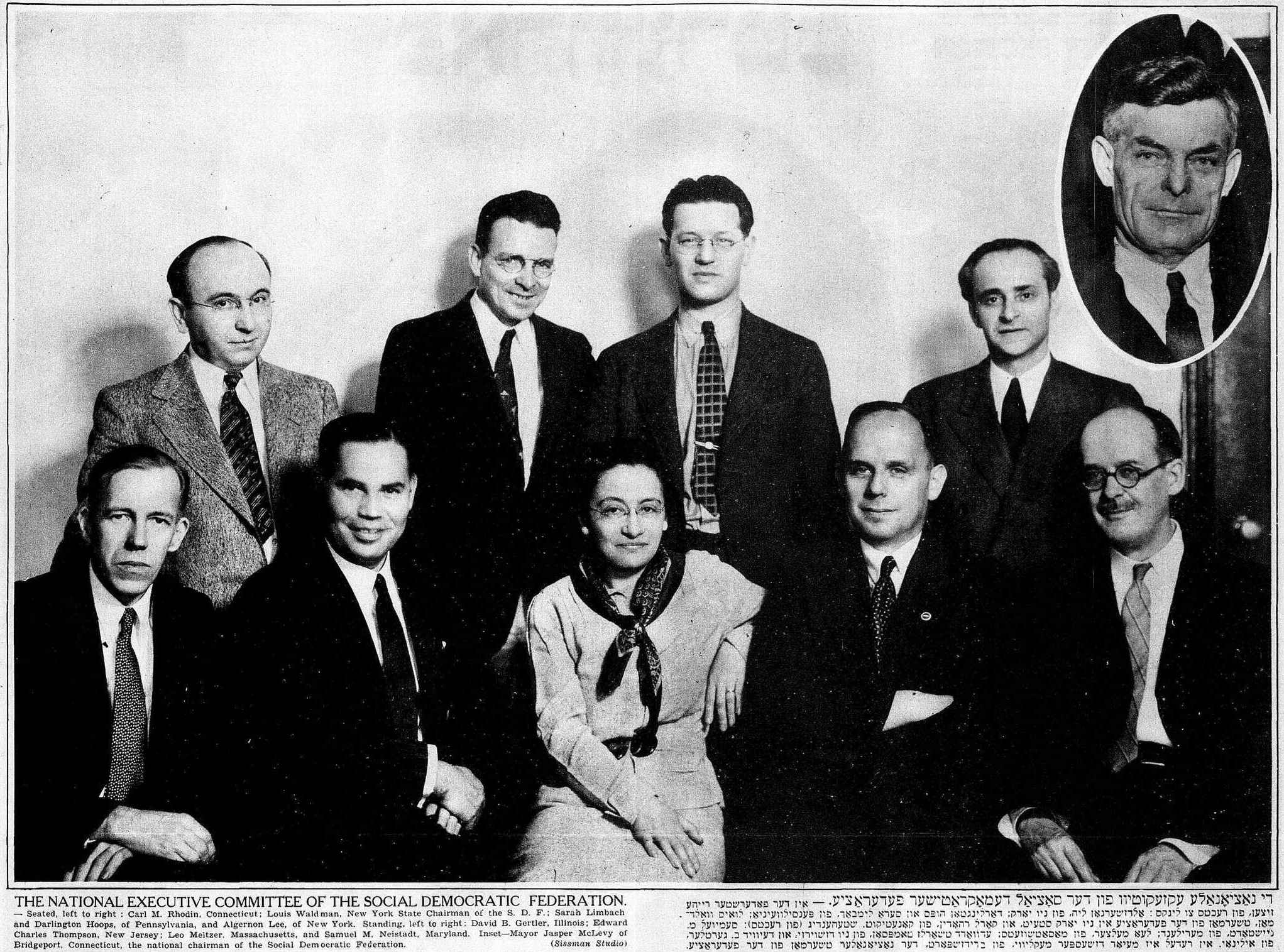
The National Executive Committee of the SDF, 1937. Seated (L-R): Carl M Rhodin, Louis Waldman, Sarah Limlach, Darlington Hoopes, Algernon Lee. Standing: David B. Gertler, Edward Charles Thompson, Leo Meltzer, Samuel M. Neistadt. Inset: Jasper McLevy.

The Old Guard opponents of the Detroit decisions formally organized themselves as a faction immediately after the close of the Detroit conclave, establishing the Committee for the Preservation of the Socialist Party. Pamphlets were published and distributed alleging the Declaration of Principles was a "culminating point of a deep seated antagonism" within the Socialist Party — the proverbial "straw that breaks or threatens to break the camel's back." A stern warning was issued that it was "not enough" to merely defeat the Detroit Declaration of Principles in the party referendum held for their ratification, but that "the Socialist Party must be made safe for Socialism, for social democracy." Names of sympathizers were gathered, funds collected, and an office established in New York City. A "Provisional Executive Committee" of the faction was named, including such long-time members of the SPA as James Maurer of Pennsylvania, Algernon Lee and Louis Waldman of New York, George Roewer of Massachusetts (Chairman of the Provisional Executive Committee), George Goebel of New Jersey, and Mayor Jasper McLevy of Bridgeport, Connecticut. Louis Hendin was engaged as Executive Secretary of the faction, which had already in 1934 taken the form of a "party within the party."

In his 1944 memoir, Socialist Party of New York State Chairman Louis Waldman freely acknowledged that he and his New York Old Guard comrades disregarded the authority of the 1934 National Convention and immediately attempted to lock up party assets in his faction's control:

Back from Detroit, I was immediately confronted with a problem which involved millions of dollars of property controlled by subsidiaries of the Socialist Party. In New York alone there were such institutions as the Jewish Daily Forward, the leading Jewish newspaper in the world with a circulation running into hundreds of thousands and with reserve funds amounting to millions. There was The New Leader, a weekly newspaper published in English; there was the Rand School of Social Science which, together with Camp Tamiment, had enormous property value, not to speak of their importance as propaganda and educational instruments. Control of the Forward alone also meant probable control of fraternal and labor organizations such as the Workmen's Circle, with its millions of dollars in property and tens of thousands of members throughout the United States...
After Detroit it was obvious that the militant Socialists controlled the Socialist Party. I saw that all they had to do in order to gain control of the valuable property in New York was to revoke the New York State charter and expel all state organizations controlled by the Social Democrats or the Old Guard. Since there was always a minority of militant Socialists in each of these corporate institutions, these properties involving millions of dollars in property value and cash reserves would quickly fall into the hands of the militants...
All during 1935 and the early part of 1936 my office was converted into a meeting place for the various committees and members of the organizations threatened by the militants. Constitutions and bylaws were modified in such a way as to prevent control falling into the hands of Norman Thomas' super-revolutionists.

=== Establishment of the Social Democratic Federation ===
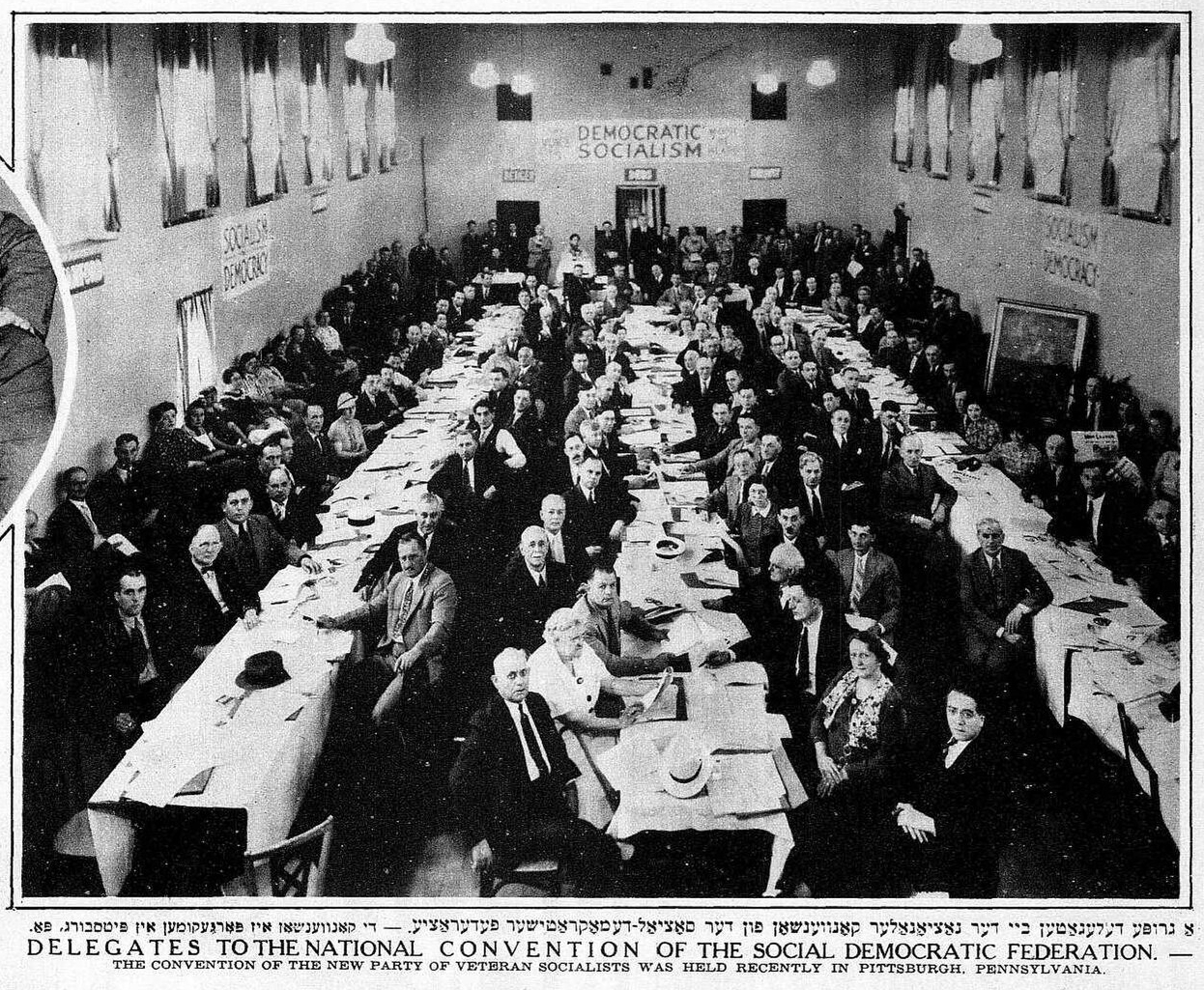
Delegates to the National Convention of the SDF, 1937

It was not until January 1936 that the National Executive Committee finally revoked the charter of the Old Guard-dominated Socialist Party of New York and reorganized the state under the leadership of an alliance of forces loyal to Norman Thomas and members of the Militant faction. The marriage had already broken up long before this divorce was finalized, however.

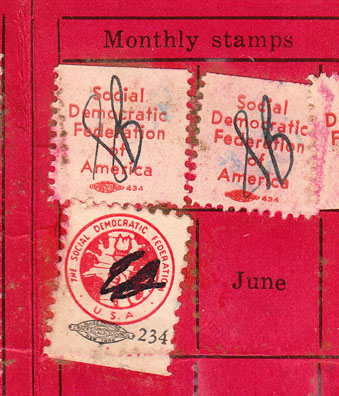
SDF dues stamps were applied continuously to regular SPA dues booklets in 1936 and 1937.

In the interim, the "Old Guard" socialists organized themselves as the People's Party of New York and affiliated for electoral purposes with the American Labor Party, which retained a ballot line in New York state. This continued until the decision was made to disband and reorganize as an "educational organization for the dissemination of socialist ideals" at two-day convention was held during the weekend of March 27–28, 1937, at the Rand School of Social Science in New York City. This new organization was to be known as the Social Democratic Federation of the State of New York.

The SDF went on to formally organize itself on a national basis at a convention held in Pittsburgh, Pennsylvania on May 29–30, 1937. This foundation gathering elected Mayor Jasper McLevy of Bridgeport, Connecticut as National Chairman of the new organization. The gathering passed a resolution of support to the Loyalist government of Spain and supporting an anti-Nazi boycott. The convention also voted to apply to the Labour and Socialist International as an affiliate.

Louis Waldman c. 1944

The SDF chose to seek international affiliation immediately with the Socialist International, over the objections of some delegates like William Karlin of New York, who urged his fellows to wait the short time until "the Trotsky Communists who call themselves the Socialist Party" joined the Fourth International before seeking admission. This theme of communist influence in the Socialist Party from whence they sprung was echoed by Louis Waldman, who declared to the press than Norman Thomas had come under "communist influence" and that "rather than lose our identity as Americans, we left the party."

The Social Democratic Federation was not organized as an electoral political organization but rather as an interest group seeking to establish connection with the trade union movement in a broader labor party. At the time of its creation the organization did incorporate the former SPA state locals in New York, Connecticut, Pennsylvania, and Maryland. The influential municipal parties in Reading, Pennsylvania and Bridgeport, Connecticut also left the Socialist Party to establish the SDF. In New York, the SDF supported Franklin Delano Roosevelt and American Labor Party candidates, but the takeover of the ALP by the Communist Party USA drove the SDF's adherents from that organization.

Executive Secretary of the SDF was August Claessens, who later served as National Chairman of the group until his death in 1954.

=== Reunification with the Socialist Party ===
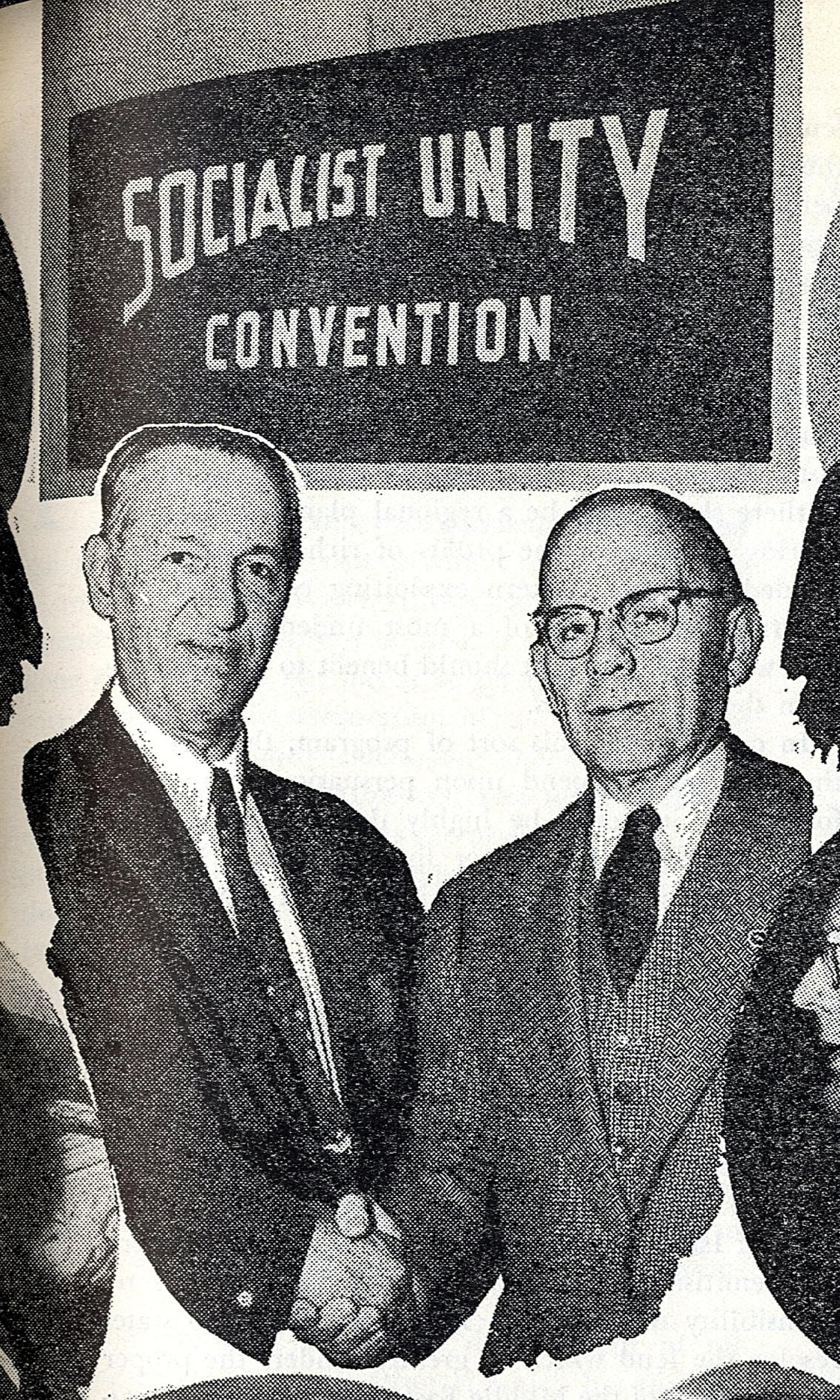
Louis P. Goldberg (left) and Darlington Hoopes shake hands at the 1957 SP-SDF Unity Convention.

Reunification with the dissident Social Democratic Federation was long a goal of the Socialist Party regulars, with initial attempts beginning as early as 1937. In his 1938 book, Socialism on the Defensive, SP leader Norman Thomas acknowledged that a number of issues had been involved in the split which led to the formation of the SDF, including "organizational policy, the effort to make the party inclusive of all socialist elements not bound by communist discipline; a feeling of dissatisfaction with social democratic tactics which had failed in Germany" as well as "the socialist estimate of Russia; and the possibility of cooperation with communists on certain specific matters." Still, he held that "those of us who believe that an inclusive socialist party is desirable, and ought to be possible, hope that the growing friendliness of socialist groups will bring about not only joint action but ultimately a satisfactory reunion on the basis of sufficient agreement for harmonious support of a socialist program." This speedy reunification failed after Nazi-Soviet Pact of 1939 revealed the threat of a coalition of two totalitarian states. The threat revealed by this pact reduced the influence of pacifists in the Federation, the Socialist Party, and the labor movement.

During the years of World War II through the first half of the 1950s, the SDF's paid membership drastically declined. Its influence on New York politics and labor unions similarly dropped. These declines corresponded with a general decline in the prestige of socialist organizations in the Cold War period, as well as the growth of Americans for Democratic Action and other liberal organizations, which tapped the SDF's support among sympathetic progressives. This decline made the SDF more amenable to reunification with the Socialist Party, which lost members while maintaining its opposition to communism and critical support for the U.S. policy of containment. After several years of negotiations, a merger was finally accomplished in 1957 to form the Socialist Party-Social Democratic Federation (SP-SDF). A small group of holdouts refused to reunify, establishing a new organization called the Democratic Socialist Federation.

== Publications ==
The SDF published a monthly, Social Democrat edited by Algernon Lee, August Claessens and Liston Oak. It ran from Vol. I #1 July 1944 to Vol XII #5 December 1955.

- Social Democratic Federation U.S.A: principles and program. Washington, D.C. : Social Democratic Federation U.S.A., 1937
- Louis Waldman Should unions be incorporated? Responsibility of unions under the law, Washington, D.C. : Social Democratic Federation U.S.A., 1937
- Frederick Shulman The meaning of social democracy New York City, N.Y. : Social Democratic Federation, 1940
- Souvenir Journal : Social Democratic Federation, Ninth Anniversary Celebration. New York : Social Democratic Federation, 1944
- William Feigenbaum "Let us review the scene" with William Feigenbaum New York City, N.Y. : Social Democratic Federation, 1951

== See also ==
- Socialist Party of America
