= Edward T. Buckingham =

American politician (1874–1942)

38th and 42nd Mayor of Bridgeport
- In office 1909–1911
- Preceded by: Henry Lee
- Succeeded by: Clifford Wilson
- In office 1929–1933
- Preceded by: William Behrens
- Succeeded by: Jasper McLevy

Personal details
- Born: May 12, 1874 Metuchen, New Jersey
- Died: July 30, 1942 (aged 68) Bridgeport, Connecticut
- Party: Democratic
- Education: Yale University; Yale Law School

Edward Taylor Buckingham (May 12, 1874 – July 30, 1942) was an American Democratic Party politician, lawyer, and jurist who was the Mayor of Bridgeport, Connecticut from 1909 to 1911 and from 1929 to 1933.

== Early life and career ==
Buckingham was born in Metuchen, New Jersey, on May 12, 1874, to Walter Taylor and Helen (Tolles) Buckingham. He graduated in 1895 Yale University with a Bachelors' of Arts Degree, and then received his law degree from the Yale Law School in 1897.

Buckingham moved to Bridgeport as a child and attended Bridgeport High School (since renamed as Central High School. He was the city clerk of Bridgeport from 1901 to 1909 and served as mayor of Bridgeport from 1909 to 1911, after which practiced law. He had another stint as mayor from 1929 to 1933. The latter stint, marred by unpopular policies made during the heights of the Great Depression, led to his loss to Socialist Jasper McLevy.
