= Committee for the Preservation of the Socialist Party =

- Founded: 1934
- Dissolved: 1936
- Split from: SPA
- Succeeded by: SDF
- Headquarters: Union Square, Manhattan
- Newspaper: The Socialist Voice
- Ideology: Social democracy Anti-communism
- Political position: Center-left

The Committee for the Preservation of the Socialist Party was a short-lived organized factional grouping in the Socialist Party of America established in 1934 by its New York–based "Old Guard" faction. The committee was initially organized to fight for the defeat of the Declaration of Principles adopted by the 1934 National Convention in the referendum for its ratification taken by mail vote of party members. After the Declaration of Principles was passed, the Committee served as the organizational core of the Social Democratic Federation of America, a rival social democratic organization to the Socialist Party established in 1936.

== History ==
"The Committee for the Preservation of the Socialist Party" was formed immediately following the conclusion of the 1934 Detroit Convention of the Socialist Party, held from June 1 to 3, 1934. At this gathering a resounding victory was won by the party's so-called "Militant" faction, composed for the most part of young revolutionary socialists, working in conjunction with the group of radical pacifists surrounding Norman Thomas. Deeply troubled by what they believed to be an official call for direct action against the American government in time of war explicit in the Declaration of Principles passed by the convention, the New York–based Old Guard faction returned home to work for the defeat of the Declaration in the forthcoming referendum vote.

A first pamphlet was published called Detroit and the Party, written by former New York State Assemblyman Charles Solomon. The name of the committee was at this time designated as the "Committee for the Preservation of Socialist Policies," changed shortly thereafter to the more familiar "Committee for the Preservation of the Socialist Party." In this pamphlet, Solomon decried the Detroit Declaration of Principles as "reckless," observing pointedly that "furious phrases cannot take the place of organized mass power." Solomon noted that over "the past three or four years" there had arisen "certain definite groups" in the ranks of the Socialist Party. He continued:

"The Declaration does not stand by itself, in a vacuum, as it were. Important as it is, it does not alone account for the vital struggle that is now being waged in the party. It represents the culminating point of a deep seated antagonism. It is like the straw that breaks or threatens to break the camel's back.

"The Declaration of Principles has brought to the surface divergences which are deep, antagonisms which make of our party not a coherent political organization working harmoniously for a common objective but a battle ground of internecine strife."

Solomon charged that the "so-called 'left'" was "making its position clear" with the Declaration of Principles. "There was no mistaking the flag it had unfurled," he declared, "It was the banner of thinly veiled communism." While he declared that "the Declaration of Principles must be decisively rejected in the referendum," he nevertheless strongly hinted that a factional split was in the offing. Merely defeating the proposed Declaration of Principles was "not enough," he concluded, "The Socialist Party must be made safe for Socialism, for social democracy."

This first pamphlet was followed by another, entitled The Crisis in the Socialist Party: The Detroit Convention: Appeal by the Committee for the Preservation of the Socialist Party. This latter document declared that throughout its 30-year history the Socialist Party had "proclaimed to the nation its purpose to bring about fundamental and radical changes in our poltiical [sic?] (political) and social structure by an appeal to the intelligence of the working class, relying on the orederly [sic?] (orderly) processes, which we, in the United States, have succeeded in establishing for ascertaining the will of the people." It continued:

"Whenever a faction rose to swerve us from those methods of education and propaganda, and to commit us to the adoption of direct action and insurrectionary methods, as in the case of the IWW and later the Communists, the Socialist Party remained true to its principles, its ideals, and its mission, preferring to part company with those to whom our Socialist position seemed untenable rather than depart from the course it had marked out for itself as an American political party.... We could not at one and the same time declare that we place our faith in the democratic processes and in convincing the masses of the soundness of our doctrines, and then proceed to achieve by force and violence the changes we advocate."

The committee objected to the language of the Declaration of Principles in reducing the American system to "the bogus democracy of capitalist parliamentarism" and its advocacy of "massed war resistance," as well as its profession of willingness to "seize power, whether the majority is willing or not" in the event of the collapse of capitalism. The Committee issued an occasional paper called The Socialist Voice. This ultra-revolutionary verbiage would only serve to alienate organized labor from the Socialist Party and bring about government repression, the committee contended.

The Committee for the Preservation of the Socialist Party in 1934 named a "Provisional Executive Committee" consisting of George E. Roewer of Massachusetts, Jasper McLevy of Connecticut, James Maurer of Pennsylvania, Emma Henry of Indiana, John C. Packard of California, George H. Goebel of New Jersey, as well as Algernon Lee, Louis Waldman, and Alexander Kahn of New York. Executive Secretary was Louis Hendin, with M. Gillis the Assistant Secretary and Edward Cassidy the Treasurer. The Committee maintained its office at 1 Union Square, Room 706, New York City.
