= Sigismund Danielewicz =

Labor organizer and anarchist (1847–1927)

- Cabinet card portrait of Danielewicz, dated December 15, 1884
- Born: 1847
- Died: 1927 (aged 79–80)
- Burial place: Mount Zion Cemetery, Los Angeles, California
- Occupation: Labor organizer

Sigismund Danielewicz (1847–1927) was a Polish-born labor organizer in the United States and Hawaii, known for his advocacy against anti-Chinese sentiment in the American labor movement. He also worked as an anarchist writer and publisher.

In the late 1870s, Danielewicz traveled to San Francisco from Congress Poland, where he began working odd jobs. By 1879 he was working as a barber in San Francisco, and in 1881 he attended a trades' assembly convention, kicking off his central involvement in trade unionist organizing in the region. He also spent time organizing workers in the Kingdom of Hawaii. Danielewicz's role in the San Francisco labor movement ended in 1885 when he opposed an anti-Chinese resolution at a West Coast Knights of Labor convention, delivering a prepared speech arguing that all men were equal and drawing on his own Jewish background. He was laughed off the stage and ostracized from the movement as a result.

Danielewicz then began publishing The Beacon, the first anarchist newspaper in the San Francisco Bay Area. He traveled around the United States and managed or wrote for various anarchist publications. In 1909 he patented a device intended to protect the wearer from polluted air, and by 1910 he was unemployed. A 1921 city directory of Los Angeles suggests that he may have been working as a polisher. He was buried on October 23, 1927, in Mount Zion Cemetery.

== Early life ==
Danielewicz was born in 1847. He traveled from Congress Poland to San Francisco in the late 1870s, where he held a variety of occupations. He was Jewish and multilingual, speaking languages including Polish, Yiddish, English and Italian. In 1879, a city directory listed him as a barber near Chinatown, San Francisco; by 1880 he had relocated to the Tenderloin. Danielewicz also spent time in the Kingdom of Hawaii, where he participated in labor organizing.

== Labor organizing ==
=== In Hawaii ===
In October 1883, Danielewicz was present at an initial meeting of the Workingmen's Union, where discussion arose as to whether political issues should be discussed. He argued that the improvement of workers' conditions was inherently political, and that while he disapproved of party politics, he believed it was the duty of the union to intervene when action within the existing political system was necessary. He additionally stated that employers and laborers alike should be admitted to the union. Both these arguments were adopted by the membership after a vote.

Danielewicz had been elected president of the union by November 10, 1883. An early issue under his responsibility was the wellbeing of a group of German women on Kauai whose husbands had been imprisoned on Oahu. These men were laborers who had refused to work at Koloa Plantation in protest of poor conditions and discrimination by the plantation manager. They were arrested for refusing, and subsequently began another strike in the Oahu jail by November 24, leading to an investigation in which the Workingmen's Union involved itself. The union invited the men's wives to Honolulu and sent money to them. Around this time Danielewicz was working as manager of a hair salon while the owner was absent.

On December 13, 1883, Danielewicz resigned from the Workingmen's Union after the passage of a resolution prohibiting discussion of socialism. He included his socialist views in his letter of resignation, expressing that the labor theory of value was "best attainable by the institution of a system of governmental co-operation of industries and agriculture, and that nothing short of such a system can insure justice to the working people and bring about the so much desired harmony in society, the happiness of the human race." He wrote that, while he would rejoin the union if it chose to allow a broader range of tactics and views, he intended to remain involved as a correspondent for the San Francisco newspaper Truth. Another member of the union blamed the reporting of several newspapers for the resignation – the Pacific Commercial Advertiser printed a humorous accounting of an altercation between Danielewicz and a bootblack on the street, as did the Daily Bulletin and The Saturday Press – but Danielewicz maintained that he had resigned due to the actions of the union.

By February 7, 1885, Danielewicz had left Hawaii. The Pacific Commercial Advertiser described him as having "achieved some little notoriety here on account of his extreme Communistic views" and reported that he wrote a letter to his local assignee expressing that, while his time in Hawaii was a financial failure, he felt he had done some good in the islands. He returned promptly to San Francisco.

=== In San Francisco ===
Danielewicz attended a Trades Assembly convention in 1881 as a delegate for the Barbers' Union, making him part of a group that would go on to play a central role in trade unionist organizing.

A winter depression in 1885 led to lowered wages for workers in the shipping industry; unlike the similarly affected metalworking trades, the shipping workers were not organized enough to resist the cuts to their pay. In response, the San Francisco section of the International Workingmen's Association (IWA) focused on the industry, and Danielewicz as well as Burnette Haskell led sailors to organize and defend their own union: the Coast Seamen's Union. As recounted by the union on the 29th anniversary of its establishment, Danielewicz "chanced to pass by" while sailors were discussing a new cut to their wages. When he suggested that they form a union, they recruited him to organize it, and he held a successful meeting at Folsom Street Wharf the next night where the union was established.

Also in 1885, Danielewicz was serving as secretary of the San Francisco IWA's central committee. He was present at a West Coast conference convened by the Knights of Labor on November 30, 1885, at which many people and groups in the labor movement were expressing anti-Chinese sentiment; one delegate from the recently formed Seamen's Union introduced a resolution to demand the expulsion of all Chinese people from San Francisco within 60 days. Danielewicz subsequently attempted to deliver a prepared statement condemning "the persecution of the Chinese". In the beginning of the speech, he expressed the belief that all men were equal and appealed to his own status as one of the persecuted Jewish people. His speech drew laughter from those at the gathering, who heckled him off the stage, and he was eventually ruled out of order by Frank Roney; his appeal to the ruling was defeated in a near-unanimous vote. Other IWA members who were present, including Haskell and Frank Roney, did not come to his defense. He was the sole opponent of Chinese exclusion at the conference.

Danielewicz's organizing activity did not continue beyond the mid-1880s. His advocacy against anti-Chinese views and policies in the labor movement, as exemplified by his 1885 speech, made him unwelcome in the local labor movement.

== Later activity and death ==
Having been ostracized from the labor movement in San Francisco, Danielewicz began publishing a newspaper called The Beacon. It was the first anarchist newspaper in the San Francisco Bay Area, where it ran from 1889 to 1891. It had previously been published in San Diego and in Dallas, where it was founded by Ross Winn. While being published by Danielewicz, The Beacon endorsed the revolutionary anarchist goals of the International Working People's Association and continued to oppose prejudice against the Chinese. According to an 1889 mention in Fair Play, contributors included Dyer Lum and Lizzie Holmes, and while the paper was "rather revolutionary" Danielewicz was "honest and earnest and evidently doing his best". A yearlong subscription cost $1 (equivalent to $36 in 2025).

Although Danielewicz once published an English translation of a Yiddish article by Saul Yanovsky in The Beacon, there was no Yiddish anarchist movement in the Bay Area at the time. The lack of a Yiddish-speaking community or a Jewish quarter in San Francisco prevented the emergence of a movement similar to that in New York. The local community of English-speaking anarchists were largely individualist anarchists and mutualist anarchists influenced by figures including Proudhon, Stirner, and Benjamin Tucker. They disapproved of The Beacon's advocacy of violent revolution, and the newspaper was supplanted by two sporadic individualist publications upon shutting down in 1891. In 1890, Fair Play republished a critique of The Beacon printed by Egoism, one of these two; the publication argued that the revolutionary stance of The Beacon "has a tendency to prevent that part of the community which constitutes its intellectual backbone, from investigating and becoming imbued with the principles of Anarchism, as must be before it can supplant political direction." Fair Play quoted Danielewicz as having written that the global labor struggles of the late 19th century were good because they might "teach the workers the lesson that they must arm themselves in order to be equal in the struggle", responding that the result of this strategy for the workers "will probably be the gallows".

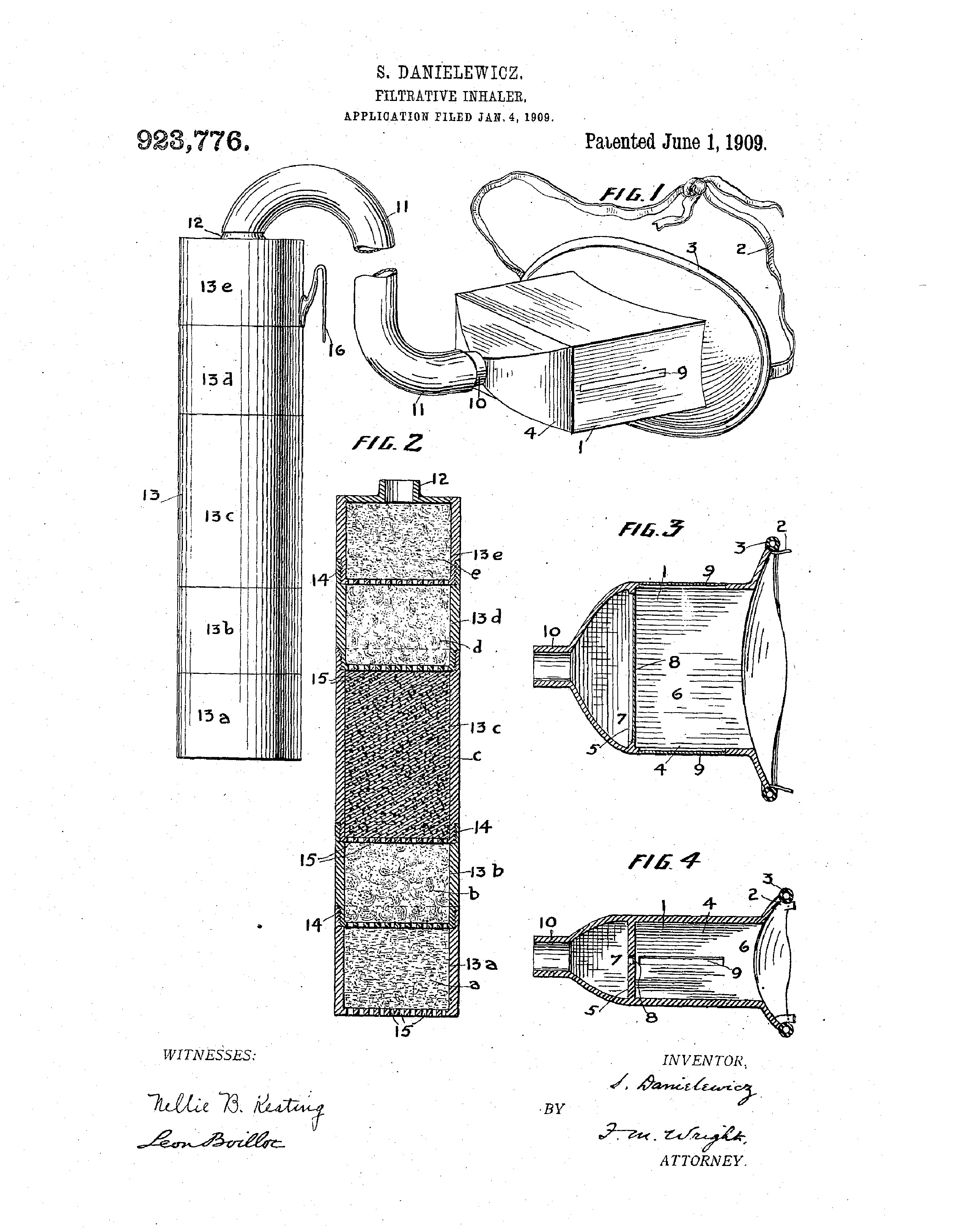
Illustration from Danielewicz's 1909 patent for a "filtrative inhaler"

Between the mid-1880s and 1910, Danielewicz traveled to San Diego and Chicago before returning to San Francisco. During his travels he helped to manage or write multiple anarchist publications including Lucifer the Lightbearer and Free Society. He sparked controversy in the latter in 1900 by denouncing individualist anarchist Henry Cohen for "adopting a profession which is the foundation of the principles he and all of us disavow" by becoming a lawyer. Thirteen people contributed to the subsequent exchange in Free Society, which lasted six months and concluded after a number of complaints and an editorial transition. During this period he also met Viroqua Daniels, a woman who became either his close friend or his romantic partner.

In 1893 Danielewicz passed through Fresno, California. The Fresno Republican printed an article about his presence which led him to write a letter clarifying his position on socialism. While the paper initially described him as anti-socialist, he described himself as an "anti-state socialist" and wrote that "I am thoroughly convinced that the condition of the masses of the people, and more especially of the class known as the working people, is almost unendurable and should be radically changed as it almost undoubtedly will be with the growing intelligence of the people."

Around the turn of the 20th century Danielewicz became an active member of the newly founded San Francisco Freethought Society along with Abraham Isaak, who published Free Society along with his wife Mary Isaak.

On January 4, 1909, Danielewicz patented a "filtrative inhaler" intended to protect the wearer from harmful particles in the air, filing the application under the name "Samuel Danielewicz". Danielewicz was jobless in the winter of 1910 and reported to be relocating to the East Coast of the United States.

In 1921, a city directory for Los Angeles identified Danielewicz as a "grinder," indicating that he may have been working as a polisher. Danielewicz's death date is not known. On October 23, 1927, he was buried at Mount Zion Cemetery in eastern Los Angeles, which had a reputation as a Jewish cemetery for poor people.

== Legacy ==
Danielewicz is repeatedly mentioned in The Indispensable Enemy by Alexander Saxton. Saxton chronicled Danielewicz's repeated failures to prevent anti-Chinese racism in the labor movement. According to historian David Roediger, Danielewicz's "brilliance as an organizer could not overcome his insistence on principle"; Saxton writes that he knew that after his 1885 speech "his comrades would permit him to be guffawed and howled and booed from the podium". Roediger argues that Saxton uses Danielewicz as an indication that solidarity between movements cannot be taken for granted. Saxton additionally characterizes Danielewicz as a hero in his introduction to the text, writing that he "might have had ships and high schools—even union halls— named for him, except that he chose to stand for the principle of interracial equality".

== See also ==
- Andrew Klemencic
