= Andrew Klemencic =

Slovene anarchist and union leader (1860–1906)

- Born: 1860; Imperial Free City of Trieste, Austrian Empire
- Died: 1906 (aged 45–46)
- Occupations: Anarchist; tailor; union organizer; writer
- Organizations: Journeymen Tailors Union; Industrial Workers of the World; Various publications

Andrew Klemencic (or Klemenčič, 1860–1906) was a Slovene anarchist and union organizer active in Europe, the United States and the Republic of Hawaii. He contributed to various anarchist publications throughout his life and was a founding member of the Industrial Workers of the World.

== Early life ==
Andrew Klemencic was born near Trieste in the Austrian Empire (now Italy), in 1860. He was Slovene and multilingual.

== Labor organizing ==
Klemencic's labor organizing caused him to travel across Europe. By 1897, he was living in San Francisco, where he contributed to the local anarchist publication Free Society published by Mary and Abraham Isaak. He worked as a tailor and organized for the Journeymen Tailors Union. Klemencic also delivered various lectures on anarchism and contributed to the anarchist press in both French and English. In 1898, he arranged a speaking tour of the San Francisco Bay Area for Emma Goldman.

In the middle of 1898, Klemencic departed San Francisco to organize workers in the Republic of Hawaii. While there, he opposed the annexation of Hawaii by the United States alongside Native Hawaiians and local Asian laborers. He wrote articles criticizing American expansionism in Free Society as well as Germinal and Les Temps Nouveaux. In 1900 he was fined $6 (equivalent to $227 in 2024) by Hawaii police for "blockading the streets" and was subsequently ordered to desist from speaking while discussing the Boxer Rebellion on a street corner. He stated "I don't think that I blockaded the streets nearly as bad as the Salvation Army" and expressed his intent to continue exercising his right to free speech. The Honolulu Republican described him as a tailor with "unique thoughts on many economic questions" and a self-described instrumental figure in the establishment of Home Colony.

In 1905, Klemencic was living in Pueblo, Colorado. He travelled to Chicago and attended the founding convention of the Industrial Workers of the World (IWW), representing his union local of the Journeymen Tailors and installing them as IWW members.

While at the convention, Klemencic introduced a successful resolution condemning militarism alongside fellow anarchist Joseph Corna. With John Riordan, Klemencic supported the name "Industrial Workers of the World" rather than the proposed "The Industrial Union of America." He argued for internationalism, stating that "all lines that were ever established have always been established by men who were a bunch of robbers, thieves and exploiters, and we want to combine ourselves as humanity, as one lot of people, those that are producing the wealth of our oppressors, and we want to have under that banner our brothers and sisters of the world." The IWW was the only labor organization in the United States to actively recruit Asians and oppose their exclusion during this period; this was due in large part to the advocacy of anarchists like Klemencic.

With the IWW established, Klemencic became a vocal member of its anarchist faction, writing for Lucy Parsons' union-aligned newspaper The Liberator and editing an IWW section for Jay Fox's Demonstrator. The latter was published from Home Colony in Washington, where Klemencic spent time. According to Radium LaVene, Klemencic worked for his father as a tailor while living in the area; LaVene described him as "bald, middle-aged".

== See also ==
- Anarchism in the United States
- Sigismund Danielewicz
