= Home Colony =

Early 20th century anarchist colony

Coordinates: 47°16′22″N 122°46′04″W

Home Colony was an anarchist colony on Puget Sound in Washington State from 1898 to 1909. Its founders were members of a former Bellamyite colony who bought 26 acres and formally organized as the Mutual Home Association in January 1898. Colonists purchased one or two acres and the proceeds purchased new land for the colony. Its colonists lived as individuals rather than cooperatively and tolerated a wide degree of social practices, including free love, free speech. They organized few cooperative institutions aside from a cooperative store (1902), some mutual construction projects, and a weekly anarchist paper, Discontent: Mother of Progress. When the newspaper was fined for obscenity, they replaced it with The Demonstrator. The original 40 colonists grew to 91 by 1900 and 155 by 1906. The colony's numerous visiting speakers included Emma Goldman. Following 1909 changes to the association's articles of incorporation allowed land to transfer from their mutual trust to private ownership, Home declined as a cooperative community but remained a home for anarchists.

Various newspapers were published in Home. The first was The New Era, published by O. A. Verity, which first appeared in March 1897 but soon faltered because it could not be distributed through the U.S. Postal Service. Charles Govan began publication of Discontent: Mother of Progress on May 11, 1898, and took on two editors of Portland's The Firebrand. On September 24, 1901, Govan and two other contributors were arrested for the obscenity of an article covering free love. The case was dismissed by judge C. H. Hanford after he read the article over lunch and found no obscene material. In 1902, Lois Waisbrooker and postmaster Mattie D. Penhallow were tried for the obscenity of an article in Clothed With the Sun. Penhallow was acquitted while Waisbrooker was found guilty and fined $100. The same grand jury also recommended that the Home post office be closed, which happened two months later on April 30. James Ferdinand Morton Jr. served as editor of a new weekly newspaper, The Demonstrator, which began publication on March 11, 1903 and was mailed out of the post office of nearby Lakebay. Morton left Home in 1905 and hoped to have Jay Fox succeed him as editor, though Fox delayed his move to Home and would only arrive in 1910, two years after The Demonstrator folded. Upon arriving, Fox founded The Agitator. In 1911 he was arrested for publishing material "tending to create disrespect for the law" and found guilty, a decision the Washington Supreme Court and U.S. Supreme Court refused to overturn. In 1913, The Agitator moved offices to Chicago and changed names to The Syndicalist.

== See also ==
- Home, Washington

== Bibliography ==
- Fogarty, Robert S. (1980). "Home Colony, or Mutual Home Association". Dictionary of American Communal and Utopian History. Westport, Connecticut: Greenwood Press. pp. 144–145. ISBN 978-0-313-21347-2. OCLC 251590189.
- Lewarne, Charles P. (1972). "The Anarchist Colony at Home, Washington, 1901-1902". Arizona and the West. 14 (2): 155–168. ISSN 0004-1408. JSTOR 40168070.
- LeWarne, Charles Pierce (1975). Utopias on Puget Sound, 1885–1915. Seattle: University of Washington Press. ISBN 978-0-295-95343-4. OCLC 995069.
- Oved, Iaácov (1988). "Sunrise and Anarchist Communities". Two Hundred Years of American Communes. New Brunswick, New Jersey: Transaction Books. pp. 311–331. ISBN 0-88738-113-8.
- Wadland, Justin (2014). Trying Home: The Rise and Fall of an Anarchist Utopia on Puget Sound. Oregon State University Press. ISBN 978-0-87071-743-7 – via Project MUSE.
  - McMichael, Barbara Lloyd (August 24, 2014). "'Trying Home': an anarchist utopia on Puget Sound". The Seattle Times.

== See also ==
- List of American utopian communities
