= Agitator (newspaper) =

American radical anarchist newspaper (1910–1912)

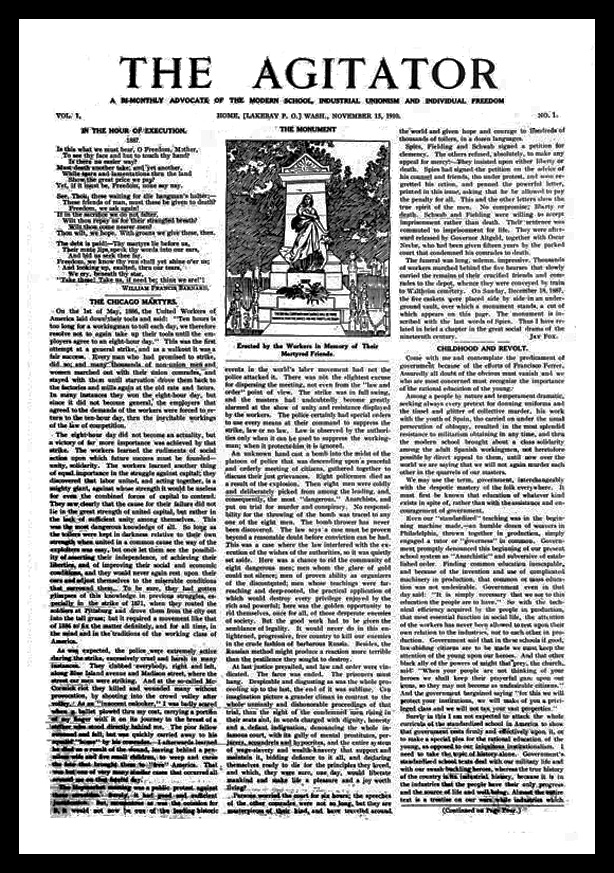
Cover of volume 1, number 1 of The Agitator, dated Nov. 15, 1910.

The Agitator was a radical newspaper published by Jay Fox of the anarchist Home Colony in the American state of Washington from 1910 to 1912.

In 1913 the paper was briefly relaunched as The Syndicalist as the official organ of William Z. Foster's Syndicalist League of North America, at which time it was moved first to Lakebay, Washington and thereafter to Chicago.

The Agitator and its successor were among the most important written vehicles for anarchosyndicalist ideas in America during the decade of the 1910s.

== Publication history ==
=== Background ===
Philadelphia-born radical labor activist William Z. Foster left home as a youth to make his own way as an itinerant worker, employed as a deckhand aboard merchant ships and traveling around the United States in pursuit of employment. By 1909 he had made his way to the Pacific Northwest, coming into contact with the Industrial Workers of the World (IWW), a radical syndicalist trade union.

Foster became a member of the IWW upon his arrival but soon became disaffected with the organization's dual union strategy, organizing workers in opposition to other unions already in the field. A brief stint in Europe in 1910 served only to solidify Foster's views on the matter. He returned home committed to the idea of working as a member of the unions of the American Federation of Labor and "boring from within" their ranks to radicalize these previously cautious and conservative bodies. Foster sought to launch a newspaper as an expression of his views, initially remaining within the ranks of the IWW and attempting to steer the organization to his point of view.

=== Launch ===
The Agitator was launched as a bi-monthly tabloid newspaper in Home, Washington on November 15, 1910. The editorial task was handled by Jay Fox. The paper concentrated upon the Free speech fights and strikes conducted by the IWW, and was sharply critical of the measured electoral strategy of the Socialist Party of America (SPA).

The political line of Fox's publication evolved steadily, beginning from a committed anarchist perspective. In addition to purely political topics, the paper gave space to more avant-garde social ideas not generally part of the discourse of radical newspapers of the day, including coverage of feminist issues and the culture of nudism.

=== Name change ===
In 1913 Foster joined forces with Fox, changing the name of The Agitator to The Syndicalist and moving the editorial office of the publication away from the Home colony to the town of Lakebay, Washington.
