= SLNA =

SLNA might refer to:

- Syndicalist League of North America, left-wing political organisation in the United States
- Song Lam Nghe An FC, Vietnamese football club
