= Viroqua Daniels =

American anarchist writer (1859–1942)

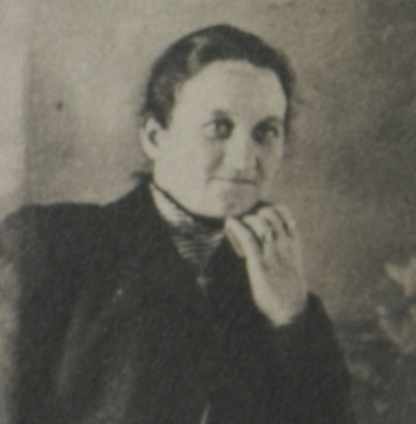
- Daniels c. 1900
- Born: December 4, 1859; Tipton, Iowa
- Died: November 1942 (aged 82–83); San Francisco
- Occupation: Anarchist writer

Viroqua Daniels (1859–1942), later Viroqua Daverkosen, was an anarchist writer in the United States.

== Early life ==
Daniels was born on December 4, 1859, to Sylvester Daniels and Mary (Lumley) Daniels in Tipton, Iowa, the third of five children. When she was sixteen years old, she moved to her family's homestead in Northern California, becoming a farmer in the mountains. At age nineteen, she was in a wagon accident, hitting her head on the steering wheel after her skirt caught in the brake; the injury led to chronic illness.

== Activity and views ==
In contrast with her anarchist contemporaries, who welcomed the revolutionary potential for self-governance in the United States Declaration of Independence, Daniels considered it a trap to sucker fools into dying in a war fought for the wealthy to avoid taxes. She self-described as an Anarcho-Communist.

When the publishers of the anarchist publication Discontent were arrested under the Comstock laws in September 1901, Daniels supported the publication on the basis of freedom of speech.

Between the mid-1880s and 1910, Daniels met Sigismund Danielewicz, who became either her close friend or romantic partner.

A 1919 report by the United States Department of Justice includes Daniels' writing in the Boston Traveler about women's suffrage:

The remarks of Rev. Thomas Dixon, Jr., set in motion novel trains of thought. Women should certainly be protected from the ballot–if they require protection from anything! Why? Because the ballot is a part of the political machinery by which rulers are elected. Rulers are bosses, bosses are masters, masters are tyrants; no matter whether the system under which they operate be that of chattel slavery or one of the various forms of the religious, political, or commercial varieties. [...] Men should be protected from the ballot, also; or, what is better, both women and men should denounce and renounce it as contaminating. Majority rule, the ideal of republican government, Is in no way superior to any other rule. [...] The corruption "sex attraction" might cause in politics would signify little, for the political infamy Is begotten, bred, and fostered in and of corruption–"'it is hard spoiling rotten eggs." If married life can not survive with the ballot in the hands of women, woman suffrage would be a blessing in disguise; provided the advance continued until the ballot, too, could be numbered with the dead institutions. Sex slavery is preposterous. Let us strike for freedom in all things, "though the heavens fall."

Daniels was additionally an atheist.

== Publications ==
Daniels contributed writing and poetry to the anarchist publications The Firebrand, Free Society, Why?, Mother Earth, and The Dawn.

== Later life and death ==
An 1898 health crisis led Daniels to move to San Francisco. Near the turn of the century, she married Richard Daverkosen and had one son, Hubert, born in 1900. She died in San Francisco in November 1942 and is buried in Lake City, California.
