= Samuel Hammersmark =

American politician (1872–1957)

Samuel Hammersmark

Samuel Tellefson Hammersmark (February 13, 1872 – 1957) was an American book publisher, trade union organizer, political activist, and Communist Party functionary. Hammersmark is best remembered as a political lieutenant of William Z. Foster in the Chicago anarcho-syndicalist and communist movements of the 1910s through the 1930s and as a candidate of the Communist Party for public office.

== Biography ==
=== Early years ===
Samuel T. Hammersmark was born February 13, 1872, in Kristiansand, Norway. His father was a carpenter who brought the family to America the same year that Samuel was born. The family settled in Chicago, Illinois, at time the second-largest city in the United States. It was there that Samuel Hammersmark attended public school.

At the age of 13 Hammermark went to work as a clerk in a Chicago book store. The furore over the 1886 bombing at Chicago's Haymarket Square and the retaliatory executions of several leading members of the Chicago radical movement the following year was an early influence upon the boy and he became associated with the anarchist movement at an early age.

The young Hammersmark's anarchism seems to have been individualistic and contemplative. Seeing no philosophical contradiction of principles, in 1889 Hammersmark quit work in order to begin study for the Christian ministry at Chesboro Seminary. He remained there until 1893. Just prior to his ordination, Hammersmark had a fundamental change of heart, declared himself an atheist, and began to search for existential meaning in the secular world.

The year 1893 was one of economic crisis, followed in 1894 by a massive strike against the Pullman Palace Car Company when it tried to impose wage cuts upon its workers. The railroad hub of Chicago was swept up in the turmoil when the fledgling American Railroad Union headed by Eugene V. Debs attempted to impose a boycott against all trains pulling Pullman cars. The boycott initially proved effective, and from June 29 to July 8, 1894, no trains left the city. Although the use of judicial injunctions and armed force eventually broke the strike, Hammersmark was inspired by the failed attempt of railroad workers to control their own economic destiny.

Hammersmark next began 2 1/2 years of study of law. As was the case with the religious ministry, Hammersmark once again found his career path of choice to be not fully sympathetic, however, so in 1904 he briefly attempted to enter yet another field of occupation, launching a publishing house called the Hammersmark Publishing Company in Chicago. A handful of books were produced, including works by philosophical anarchist Leo Tolstoy and Illinois Governor John Altgeld, a man who gained fame but lost election over his pardon of the surviving radicals imprisoned as a result of the Haymarket Affair.

Hammersmark's interest in the radical labor movement moved him into a participatory role in 1905 when he attended in Chicago the founding convention of a new revolutionary industrial union, the Industrial Workers of the World (IWW). At the convention Hammersmark came into contact with a number of leading American labor radicals, including former American Railroad Union head and Socialist Party of America founder Eugene V. Debs, mining union organizer Mother Mary Jones, Western Federation of Miners secretary "Big Bill" Haywood, and radical journalist and socialist theoretician Daniel DeLeon. Hammersmark became a convinced supporter of the IWW's strategy of competition with the established "conservative" unions of the American Federation of Labor — a policy known as dual unionism.

Towards the end of the first decade of the 20th Century Hammersmark moved to Washington state, where he was active in the working class anarchist movement. There he met a number of future leaders of the American radical movement, including in particular William Z. Foster and Jay Fox. While living in Tacoma, Hammersmark acted as editor of the anarchist newspaper Why? in between its first editor, Frances Moore, and its final editor, Eugene Travaglio.

=== Union activity ===
In the summer of 1912, syndicalist leader William Z. Foster returned to Chicago to take a job as a railway car inspector after having spent the better part of a decade in Seattle, Washington, and Portland, Oregon, in the Pacific Northwest. He was joined there by Jay Fox, a friend who had edited an anarchist newspaper produced at the utopian Home Colony in the Puget Sound area of Western Washington. The pair attempted to establish a new anarcho-syndicalist organization in the industrial mecca of Chicago, hoping that their ideas about revolutionary unionism would there ignite.

Foster and Fox's organization, called the Syndicalist League of North America, was headquartered in a rooming house run by anarchist activist Lucy Parsons, widow of one of the best known victims of the Haymarket Affair of the 1880s. Hammersmark watched the origins of this organization from afar, living in Tacoma, Washington, and editing an anarchist newspaper there called Why? through the beginning of June 1914. To pay the bills, Hammersmark ran a tobacco shop in Tacoma, an enterprise which also stocked an array of Marxist and other radical political literature.

Ultimately, however, the activities of Foster and Fox drew Hammersmark back to Chicago to participate in Syndicalist League activity there.

In 1917 Hammersmark joined the Retail Clerks' International Protective Society, for which he worked as a general organizer until 1919. In 1919 he was also elected President of Chicago's Department Store Workers' Joint Council.

Hammersmark was called into duty by William Z. Foster in the summer of 1919, during the Great Steel Strike, of which Foster was the lead organizer. Hammersmark was employed as the local organizer for the Youngstown, Ohio, district during the bitter campaign to unionize American steel workers.

After the defeat of the 1919 Steel Strike, Hammersmark became involved in the burgeoning movement to establish a Labor Party in America. In 1920 Hammersmark was elected as Secretary-Treasurer of the Cook County Labor Party, one of the organizational forerunners of the Labor Party of the United States. He remained at that post until submitting his resignation in May 1921. Despite leaving the post as chief functionary of the Chicago Labor Party organization, Hammersmark remained close to the national movement to establish a Farmer-Labor Party, appearing on the primary election ballot of the Cook County FLP in 1922.

Hammersmark was elected to the executive board of the Chicago Federation of Labor in 1921.

=== Communist period ===
In December 1921 Hammersmark joined the newly established Workers Party of America, a "legal" Communist political party launched by the underground Communist Party of America. He became active in the radical movement's efforts to defend political prisoners, and was employed as the Chicago secretary and a national organizer for the Labor Defense Council, a Communist Party mass organization formed in the aftermath of a government raid upon the 1922 Bridgman Convention of the underground Communist Party of America.

Hammersmark was also active in the Communist Party's trade union affiliate, the Trade Union Educational League (TUEL), an organization headed by his longtime associate William Z. Foster. Although funded by the Communist International through the American Communist Party, the TUEL was essentially a parallel organization in its earliest phase, with the organization directed by a small circle in 1923 consisting of Foster, the man who brought him into the Communist orbit, Earl Browder, and key Chicago organizer Jack Johnstone — occasionally joined in their sessions by Hammersmark.

Hammersmark ran for political office as a candidate of the Workers Party in 1924, standing for U.S. Congress in the Illinois 7th District.

Hammersmark headed the Communist Party of Illinois' state ticket in November 1936 as the CPUSA's candidate for Governor.

=== Later years, death, and legacy ===
In his later years, Hammersmark worked as the manager of the Modern Bookstore, the Communist Party's book shop in Chicago.

Samuel T. Hammersmark died in 1957. His body was buried at Forest Home Cemetery in Forest Park, Illinois.

While no comprehensive collection of Hammersmark's papers was preserved, a portion of his correspondence resides in the Jack and Sue Kling papers at the Chicago History Museum.

== Works ==
=== Articles ===
- "The Impossibility of an Anarchist Program," The Agitator [Home, WA], vol. 1, no. 15 (June 15, 1911).

=== Books published ===
- John Altgeld, The Cost of Something for Nothing. Chicago: Hammersmark Publishing Co., 1904.
- Ernest Howard Crosby, Tolstoy as a Schoolmaster. Chicago: Hammersmark Publishing Co., 1904.
- Clarence Darrow, Resist Not Evil. Chicago: Hammersmark Publishing Co., 1904.
- Edgar Lee Masters, The New Star Chamber, and Other Essays. Chicago: Hammersmark Publishing Co., 1904.
- Charles Edward Russell, The Twin Immortalities And Other Poems. Chicago: Hammersmark Publishing Co., 1904.
- Leo Tolstoy, Bethink Yourselves: Tolstoy's Letter on the War between Russia and Japan. Chicago: Hammersmark Publishing Co., 1904.
