= Rose Payne =

American molecular biologist (1909–1999)

Rose O. Payne
- Born: Rose Marise Ostroff; August 5, 1909; Lakebay, Washington
- Died: April 18, 1999 (aged 89)
- Education: University of Washington
- Scientific career
- Workplaces: Oklahoma State University–Stillwater; University of Washington; Seattle Central College; Stanford University Medical Center
- Thesis: Studies on the metabolism of bacteria of marine origin (1937)

Rose Marise Ostroff Payne (August 5, 1909 – April 19, 1999) was an American molecular biologist. She was best known for her discovery and contributions to understanding of the human major histocompatibility complex, the human leukocyte antigen. Her colleagues referred to her as "The Mother of HLA".

== Early life and education ==
Payne was born in Lakebay, Washington. Her parents were Russian immigrants and were committed to ending social inequality. She lived in the anarchist Home Colony. She said that her mother, Ethel Ostroff, was a "bit of a feminist deprived of formal education because of the old country attitude toward a Jewish female." Payne was a student at the University of Washington, where she majored in bacteriology. Her undergraduate research considered immunity to Brucella abortus. She remained in Washington for doctoral research, investigating bacteria of marine origin. After completing her doctorate, Payne joined Oklahoma State University–Stillwater (then Oklahoma A & M). She worked as a research fellow at the University of Washington and lecturer at Seattle Central College. Payne was out of science for five years, during which time she worked as a social worker. During World War II, she served as a counselor for women shipyard workers.

== Research and career ==
In 1948, Payne was made a research associate at Stanford University Medical Center and started working on human immunohematology. Nine years later, Payne reported the first observation of white blood cell antibodies (leukoagglutinins). She showed that everyone contains different types of white blood cells. She collected a considerable number of serology samples, building an extensive library that formed the basis of her future investigations. She found that white blood cell antibodies formed as an immunological reaction to blood transfusions and in pregnant women in response to the paternal human leukocyte antigen. Her observations of leukoagglutinins was critical to her eventual discovery and description of the human leukocyte antigen, the human major histocompatibility complex.

Payne was promoted to senior scientist in 1964. She moved to Palo Alto, taking her biochemical library and enthusiasm for molecular genetics. She partnered with Walter Bodmer, using his computational software to describe the alleles of the human leukocyte antigen system. She continued to share her discoveries, reagents and data amongst the scientific community. At the time there was a growing appreciation of histocompatibility, and it became evident that human leukocyte antigens were critical in determining compatibility of organ transplants.

Payne was promoted to professor in 1972. In 1985, the American Society for Histocompatibility and Immunogenetics established the Rose Payne Distinguished Scientist Award to honor her services to histocompatibility and immunogenetics.

== Awards and honors ==
- 1964 American Association of Blood Banks John Elliot Memorial Award
- 1977 American Association of Blood Banks Karl Landsteiner Memorial Award
- 1980 Katherine D. McCormick Distinguished Lecture
- 1984 Woman of Achievement Award

== Selected publications ==
- ROBERT S. EVANS; KAZUYUKI TAKAHASHI; ROSE T. DUANE; ROSE PAYNE; CHI-KONG LIU (1 January 1951). "Primary thrombocytopenic purpura and acquired hemolytic anemia; evidence for a common etiology". JAMA Internal Medicine. 87 (1): 48–65. doi:10.1001/archinte.1951.03810010058005. ISSN 2168-6106. PMID 14782741. Wikidata Q33358964.
- Rose Payne; Mary R. Rolfs (1 December 1958). "Fetomaternal leukocyte incompatibility". Journal of Clinical Investigation. 37 (12): 1756–1763. doi:10.1172/jci103768. ISSN 0021-9738. PMC 1062862. PMID 13611043. Wikidata Q33709211.
- R. PAYNE; M. TRIPP; J. WEIGLE; W. BODMER; J. BODMER (1 January 1964). "A New Leukocyte Isoantigen System in Man". Cold Spring Harbor Symposia on Quantitative Biology. 29: 285–295. doi:10.1101/sqb.1964.029.01.031. ISSN 0091-7451. PMID 14278475. Wikidata Q78303530.
