= C. L. James =

American anarchist writer and journalist (1846–1911)

- Born: Charles Leigh James; October 23, 1846; Baden-Baden, Grand Duchy of Baden
- Died: June 3, 1911 (aged 64); Eau Claire, Wisconsin, U.S.
- Occupations: Writer; Journalist
- Movement: Anarchism
- Spouse: Maria Charlotte Hoyt (m. 1873, div. 1887, m. 1893)
- Children: 3
- Father: George Payne Rainsford James
- Relatives: Honoratus Leigh Thomas (grandfather)

Charles Leigh James (October 23, 1846 – June 3, 1911) was an American anarchist writer and journalist. He regularly contributed pieces to the anarchist press, including to Mother Earth, Lucifer the Lightbearer, Free Society, The Alarm, and Liberty.

== Biography ==
James was born October 23, 1846, in Baden-Baden, Grand Duchy of Baden, in modern-day Germany, the son of English historian and novelist George Payne Rainsford James and Frances James (née Thomas). James travelled extensively as a child before settling in England in 1860 following his father's death. He studied at Cheltenham College and Brighton College. In 1865, the family emigrated to Eau Claire, Wisconsin.

In 1866, James opened a short-lived grocery store. He worked as a journalist for local papers and lectured on religion and temperance. In 1873 he married Maria Charlotte Hoyt, with whom he had three daughters. In 1885 he played a leading role in a water-works strike in Eau Claire. In 1887 Maria divorced James citing lack of support and inhuman treatment, including accusations that he threatened her with a knife and locked her in a barn overnight. James did not contest the divorce. They remarried in 1893.

James rarely left the local area, with most of his political activity being through his writings. In 1893, he travelled to Chicago to attend a conference, organised by William Holmes, which aimed to establish a common programme to unite American anarchists. Voltairine de Cleyre, who met him at the conference, described him as the "most learned and systematic thinker" of the anarchist movement. In contrast, he was disliked by the individualist Benjamin Tucker, who had boycotted the conference and called James a "champion humbug and mountebank" of communist anarchism. Following the assassination of William McKinley, a moral panic about anarchism and political repression of the movement swept the United States; James called it a "stamp-out craze" and compared it to the St. Bartholomew's Day massacre.

James died June 3, 1911, at home in Eau Claire aged 64.

== Publications ==
- Religious Meditations and Other Poems, Liberal, Reformatory and Miscellaneous (1871)
- Anarchy: A Tract for the Times (1886)
- An Appeal to the Women of America in Behalf of Liberty and Justice (1891)
- History of the French Revolution (1902)
- Origin of Anarchism (1902)
- Anarchism and Malthus (1910)

== Bibliography ==
- Avrich, Paul (1978). "Anarchism without Adjectives". An American Anarchist: The Life of Voltairine de Cleyre. Princeton University Press. pp. 144–170. ISBN 0-691-04657-3. LCCN 78-51153.
- Isaak, Abe (October 1911). "C. L. James". Mother Earth. Vol. VI, no. 8. pp. 245–248.
- Reichert, William O. (1976). "Dyer D. Lum and C. L. James: Anarchist Scholars of the Midwest". Partisans of Freedom: A Study in American Anarchism. Bowling Green University Popular Press. pp. 244–257. ISBN 978-0-87972-118-3 – via Internet Archive.
