= Jay Fox =

Radical political activist Jay Fox as he appeared in 1908.

Jay Fox (August 20, 1870 – March 8, 1961) was an American journalist, trade unionist, and political activist. The political trajectory of his life ran through anarchism, syndicalism, and communism, and he played a significant role in each of these political movements.

Fox is best remembered as a leading figure in a radical collective located in Home, Washington, near Tacoma, where he was editor of one of the leading English-language anarchist newspapers of the day, The Agitator. He became embroiled in legal difficulties related to the 1910 Los Angeles Times bombing and after 1913 made his home in Chicago, Illinois, where he was a close political associate of future Communist Party leader William Z. Foster.

== Biography ==
=== Early life ===
Jay Fox was born in New Jersey of Irish Catholic parents who had just immigrated to America. The family soon moved to Chicago, where he grew up in poor, immigrant neighborhoods near the stock yards. Quitting school at an early age he went to work growing cabbage for the stockyards, and later at Malleable Iron Works in fall 1885. He joined the Knights of Labor in 1886 and was present at the famous strikes for the eight-hour day on May 1 and 3 of that year, as well as at the Haymarket Square incident.

Later, in 1893, while working for Illinois Central Railroad, he was a charter member of the first local of the American Railway Union and delegate at its first convention in June 1894. After the virtual collapse of that movement following the Pullman Strike, he seems to have campaigned in several eastern US cities for William Jennings Bryan and visited England after his loss in the presidential election of 1896.

Returning to Chicago by November 1897, he became associated with the group around the periodical Free Society that included Emma Goldman. He apparently conspired with her to attempt to break Alexander Berkman out of jail by tunneling into the prison, without success. After the assassination of President McKinley he was arrested and thrown into jail with all the other associates of the periodical, but released soon thereafter. Fox continued his writing and speech making career in New York and Chicago for the next few years, marrying Esther Abramowitz sometime in the middle of the decade.

After the Free Society moved to New York and then folded in 1904, the Chicago anarchists began to gather funds for the creation of a new anarchist paper. But a rift soon developed between Lucy Parsons and Jay Fox. Parsons still wanted to publish the paper in Chicago, whereas Fox wanted to adopt the already existing Demonstrator which was in difficult financial straits. Fox took the money already raised and sent it to Home without Parsons permission—essentially purchasing it—and promised to come to the colony to edit it personally. However health problems prevented him from coming to the colony until 1908, by which time Demonstrator had already folded. Even without Fox's personal supervision, however, the focus of Demonstrator began to shift away from the colony and more towards an anarcho-communist viewpoint focusing on the militant labor movement and the Industrial Workers of the World. This focus seems to have contrasted with the individualist anarchist views of most of the colony members.

=== Knights of Labor and the Haymarket Riots ===
Labor unions were used to unite workers in fighting for better treatment and working conditions for themselves. The members of the unions were tired of the way things were and decided to do something about it. They began organizing meetings and started to plan strikes and picket lines at their factories. One of the largest of these groups was the Knights of Labor (KOL). Fox became a member of this union in 1886 when he was sixteen years old. Upon joining the KOL, Fox agreed to participate in the strike because factory workers wanted the workday brought to consist of a set number of eight hours. People were tired of working the almost half day shifts for small amounts of pay which had become the standard of the time.

Fox and other protesters lined up in front of Malleable Iron Works, where Fox worked, and others at McCormick Reaper Works where things got violent. Fox experienced the violence of the McCormick workers where he wandered for a time to see the protestors throwing stones and then the arrival of the police who began shooting people in the crowd; some were injured and even killed. Fox described it as "a reign of terror," where police "brutally attacked workers' meetings with clubs and pistols." People later gathered at Haymarket square, among these people was Fox. The rioters met here to discuss what had happened at the previous strike and the police brutality that had occurred. During this gathering a pipe bomb was thrown into the audience, which caused chaos and added to the number of dead.

These events known as the Haymarket Riots angered many people and gave a bad impression of the labor unions due to the violence that they had incurred. However, protests such as these helped to make an impression upon the industrial heads. It made them start to realize that they were going to have to make changes for the workers or suffer the consequences. The Haymarket Riots were one of the things that set the era of worker reform into motion to help millions of people improve their lives. Work to reform the eight-hour day paid off eventually and continues on today. This showed the people in charge that laborers were no longer willing to be treated so inhumanely and that they would do what needed to be done in order to change what they wanted. Because of this push for the eight-hour day, doors were open for reform of other unfair treatments of laborers. It helped to work towards a more just labor system in general. Young Jay Fox had been a part of this at the age of sixteen; he had helped in a cause to make a difference. Not only this but he left behind writings that let future generations know what had happened in his account of the event "I Was At Haymarket." Through this writing he showed what was going on at the time, what people decided to do about the unfair treatment, and the injustice of the authorities handling the situation.

=== Home, Washington ===
Fox described Home as "a community of free spirits, who came out into the woods to escape the polluted atmosphere of priest-ridden, conventional society." Home, also known as the Mutual Home Colony Association or the Home Colony, was a perfect example of Fox's individualistic ideals. Fox supported freethinking and being yourself even if it clashed with mainstream society. Fox felt people should be free to express themselves in any way they wanted.

Home was set up in response to similar ideas from men before Fox. Three anarchists established the tiny town, located on the Key Peninsula in the middle of the Puget Sound, which became a focal point for like-minded individuals who were outcast by society.

In February 1896, George H. Allen, L.F. Odell, and Oliver A Verity left the small experimental commune of Glennis, with what was left of the failed town's treasury, and purchased a tract of land where Home was established.

Soon the small multitudinous community grew as it attracted more and more settlers with the same ideals. By 1901, the permanent, as some came and went, population of the Home Colony had reached close to 100 and was attracting attention from their neighbors. In 1901, the printer of the local Home newsletter was fined for distributing an article deemed obscene by the Pierce County Superior Court. Later the same year, several Home colonists traveled to nearby Anderson Island and lectured about anarchy. The Tacoma Evening News denounced the lecture and many in Tacoma believed two of the Home colonists garnered government pensions. This caused a stir among people along the Puget Sound, as it was widely spread that the government was in a roundabout way supporting anarchy.

These events were lost in the wake of McKinley's assassination and the hatred that was aimed at anarchists and the Home colonists. Numerous articles proclaimed the indecency of anarchists and in turn the Home colonists. Religious leaders spoke out against the groups as well, saying they were wicked, sinful people. Outlaws, vipers, and damnable people were all used by local newspapers to describe the colonists of Home. James Ferdinand Morton, Jr., the colony's editor at the time, admitted opposition to President William McKinley's policies but that the colony mourned the death of the President, and saying the assassination was "useless". Morton wrote that Leon Czolgosz was not a true anarchist and therefore his actions did not reflect on the anarchist society. Morton wrote two letters to the Tacoma Ledger pleading for justice but both went unpublished.

After these tumultuous years, Home continued to grow where a free atmosphere and diverse thoughts and ideas appealed to people. Atheists, religious, free love practitioners, communists, socialists, and much more mingled together until after World War I. The Great War came and brought with it a pressure to conform and unite against an outside enemy. This, along with quarrelling among the colonists on the wellbeing of their community, brought an end to Home in the late 1910s.

While residing in the libertarian colony of Home, Fox headed up duties as editor and author of Home's surrogate newspaper, The Agitator. In this publication the views of the colony were made known through what Fox described as a position of "freedom first, last and all the time". The Agitator presented readers a taste of Fox's renowned views on industrial unionism and the individual empowerment he felt that early 20th century society was lacking.

=== The Agitator ===
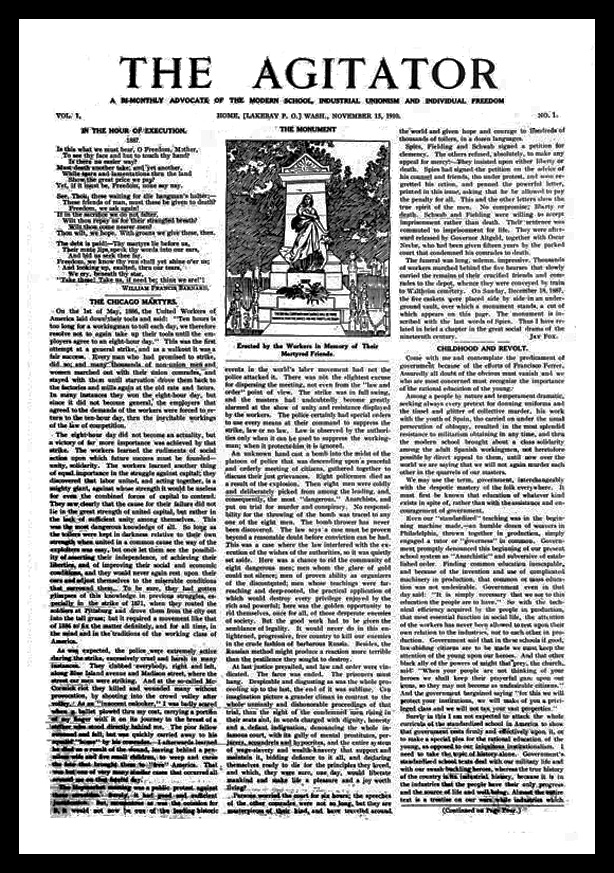
The debut issue of Fox's newspaper, The Agitator.

The very first issue of the publication dispersed on November 18, 1910 paid homage to those who had been sentenced to death as a result of their involvement in the Hay Market riots in Chicago around 23 years prior. In an article Fox wrote for this issue, entitled "The Chicago Martyrs", he shares his sentiment about the workers push for an eight-hour work day. He accounts that "The eight hour day did not become an actuality, but a victory of far more importance was achieved by that strike. The workers learned the rudiments of social action upon which future success must be founded." Motivated by his reflection of these transgressions, Fox further elaborated on the happenings of the Haymarket riots by writing articles in later issues encouraging these types of measures to be taken in the future, in order to uphold an anarchist environment in Home.

Many of the radical rights that Fox advocated were documented in The Agitator and were welcomed by segments of the colonial population. Through Home, Jay Fox gained recognition as an author among those receptive to his views, while also becoming a persistent critic of individuals unwilling to tolerate his confrontational style. Fox’s capacity to influence public opinion and intensify political unrest was partly strengthened by his position as author and editor of Home’s newspaper, The Agitator.

=== Legal problems ===
While publisher of The Agitator at Home, Fox became involved in two legal controversies. The first involved the sensational Los Angeles Times bombing of 1910, in which 21 people had been killed. Private detective William J. Burns sought the arrest of a former resident of Home Colony, David Caplin, and his associate Matt Schmidt in connection with the case, believing the two to have been conspirators. Burns established headquarters in Tacoma early in October 1911 and began staking out the house of Jay Fox and searching his mail, convinced that as editor of The Agitator he knew the whereabouts of the two fugitives.

An undercover spy named Donald Vose was employed by Burns and he managed to locate Caplan in Seattle, and he was placed under surveillance. Vose was then dispatched to New York City, where he met anarchist writer Emma Goldman and borrowed her apartment briefly, and managed to make contact with Schmidt on the pretext that he was in possession of a letter for him. With Schmidt's living location identified, Vose returned to Washington and the pair of fugitives were arrested.

Although innocent of connection with the bombing, as part of the October 1911 investigation Jay Fox was arrested on a charge of sedition, being released before trial on $2,000 bail. Charges were levied that with his friend Caplan, Fox had attempted to obtain dynamite in 1910 and had studied the art of bomb-making with him at the Home Colony.

Fox was more directly involved in a subsequent free speech case involving one of his articles, "The nudes and the prudes" in the July 1, 1911 issue of the Agitator. After several residents had been arrested for nude bathing, the colony began to divide into radical and more conservative factions. A bitter and personal antagonism developed between the two camps. Fox article labeled the groups the nudes and the prudes and editorialized in favor of the former. Seven weeks later he was arrested for violating a law that made it a misdemeanor to "encourage or advocate disrespect for the law or any court or courts of justice." The case went to trial in January 1912 and the jury found Fox guilty of the offense, but recommend a lenient punishment. Fox reported for jail to serve a two-month sentence on February 6 of that year, but was quickly out on bond.

=== Move to Chicago ===
Fox decided to leave Home Colony in favor of a new start in Chicago, where syndicalist leader William Z. Foster had moved in order to establish a new organization called the Syndicalist League of North America. Fox brought with him his publication The Agitator, previously produced at Home Colony, and renamed it The Syndicalist, making it the official organ of the new organization. The organization's total membership never exceeded 2,000 members, although it did manage to establish local groups in Kansas City, St. Louis, San Diego, Omaha, and in Chicago. The group attracted several important activists to its ranks, including Samuel Hammersmark and Foster's future son-in-law, Joseph Manley.

In February 1913 the state supreme court denied a rehearing and the case was appealed the United States Supreme Court. The high court handed down its ruling upholding the original judgment on May 13, 1915. By the time Fox had returned from Chicago and was a vice-president of the International Union of Timber Workers. Appeals from his lawyer and by an official of the union convinced Gov. Ernest Lister to pardon Fox on September 11, 1915, twelve days before the sentence would have ended.

=== Later years ===
By 1914 Fox had returned to the Northwest. He worked with J. C. Brown to expand the Shingle Weavers' Union into the International Union of Timber Workers; he became a vice-president of the new group, and got Foster a job as an organizer. The ITWU planned on conducting a general strike on May 1 to get the eight-hour day, but called the project off when the Socialists got an eight-hour proposal on the ballot for that November. The proposal failed and the union disintegrated.

It was also during this period that his common law wife, Esther, separated from him. She would marry William Z. Foster in 1918. It was evidently an amicable separation and the three remained friends.

Fox joined the National Non-Partisan League for a while in Chicago in 1918, but soon quit because he did not want to be transferred to Bismarck. He returned to Seattle and participated in the Seattle general strike of 1919. In June 1919 he married his third and final wife, Cora Peterson, a Danish immigrant. Fox continued to participate in community politics, being elected president of the Mutual Home Association by one faction of the group in 1917. However, the Association was put in receivership in September 1919 and finally dissolved in 1921.

== Works ==
- Roosevelt, Czolgosz, and Anarchy. Chicago: Free Society, n.d. [c. 1901].
- Trade Unionism and Anarchism: A Letter to a Brother Unionist. Chicago: Social Science Press, 1908.
- Free Speech Case of Jay Fox. New York, Free Speech League, 1912.
- Amalgamation. Labor Herald Library No. 5. Chicago: Trade Union Educational League, n.d. [1922].
