= Agincourt. A Romance. =

1844 book by George Payne Rainsford James

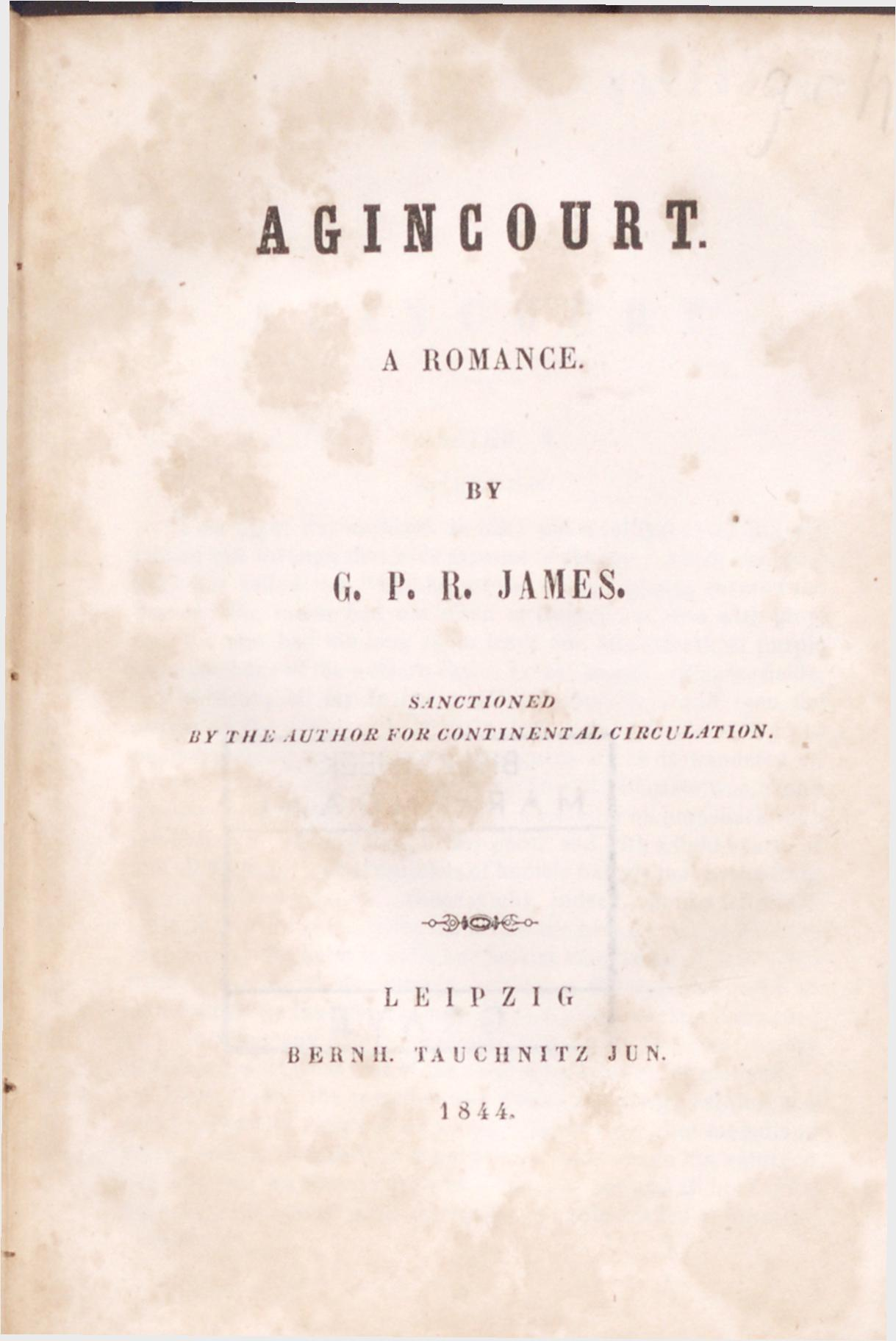
- The front page of the 1844 edition.
- Author: George Payne Rainsford James
- Language: English
- Genre: Historic fiction
- Set in: 1413–1415
- Publication date: 1844
- Pages: 450
- OCLC: 2024570

Agincourt. A Romance. is an 1844 book by George Payne Rainsford James. It is set in 1413 to 1415, with the story evolving around Henry V's coronation and the conflicts in France during the Hundred Year's war leading up to the Battle of Agincourt in 1415.

The novel belongs to the genre of historic fiction and can be attributed to the period of romanticism. It has been published in collections as well as in three volumes. The novel has been published in at least 50 editions in 3 languages. It consists of 46 chapters, told from the perspective of an omniscient narrator.

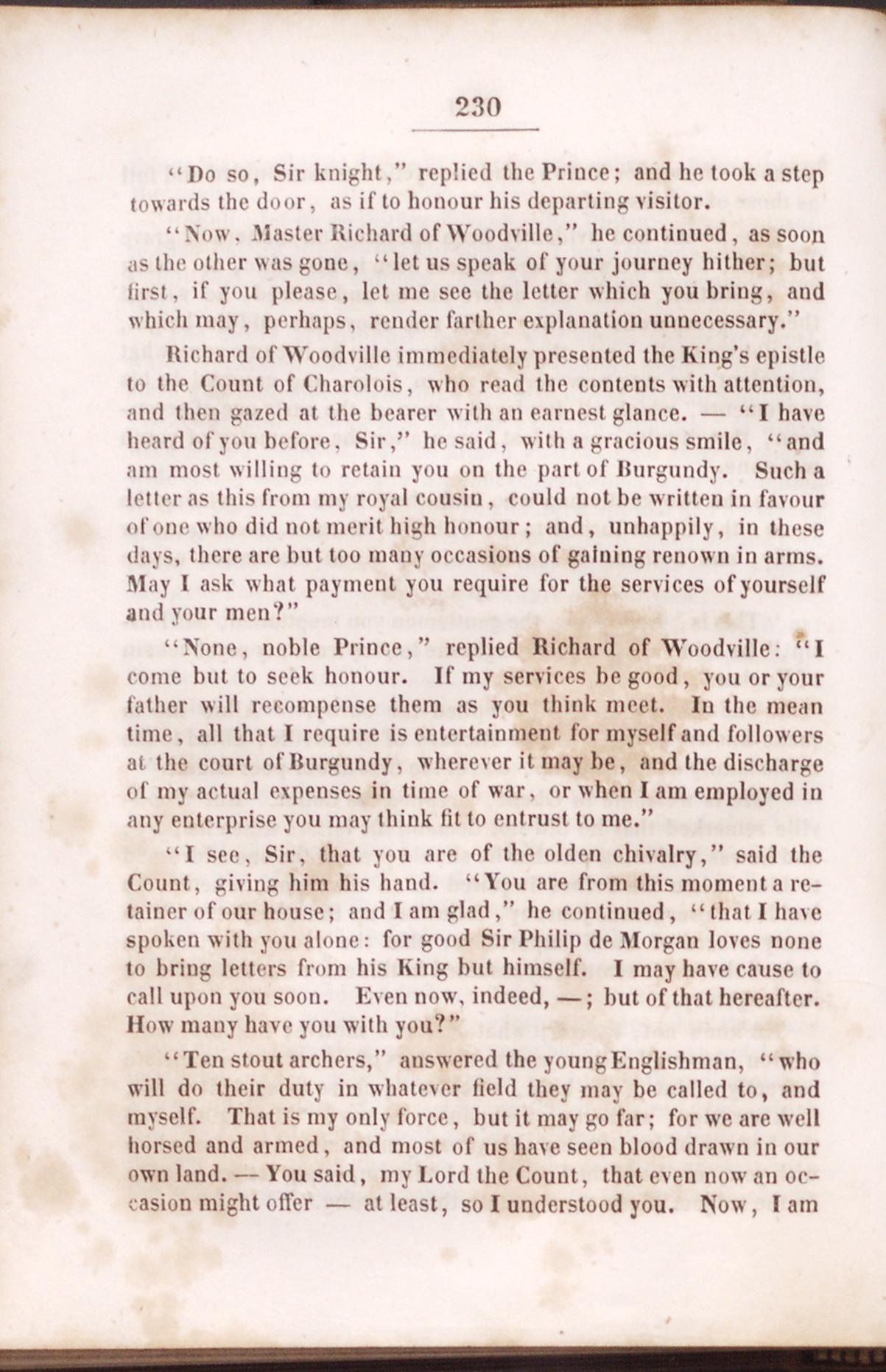
Page 230 of the book

== Context ==
James was a British Consul, causing him to travel frequently and live in countries like the US and Italy. He served in the army, which is reflected by the topic of patriotism and an uprising war in the novel. He also held the title of Historiographer Royal, a profession related to his interest in writing historic fiction. He has published over 61 novels, most of them belong to the genre of historic fiction and are set in late medieval and early renaissance settings. The books are mostly about European history with a focus on Great Britain. His works are part of the epoque of romanticism. Central themes in romantic literature are emotions, a return to nature, and a glorification of the past. Especially late medieval times, folklore and mythology with patriotic topics were preferred. Agincourt. A Romance. follows these central themes, often using nature to support the plot, glorifying medieval times, and focusing on the emotions of the protagonist. Social rules and morals also became central motifs in the later years of romanticism, in which Agincourt. A Romance. was written. The novel is focused on the morals of England and Europe in the 15th century, the author presents a return to more simple moral structures and chivalry as opposed to the rising of complicated moral philosophy in the early 19th century. Many other works by him deal with the same topic, he even published a book about the history of chivalry. This novel follows this common topic and is most exemplary of all of his works for his main interest in chivalry and romance. The book has been published in collections, such as the first edition, and in three volumes. The format of three volumes is commonly found in the author's works.

British history in the 18th and 19th century was shaped by conflicts, such as the American Independence, the War of 1812 or the Opium Wars. Meanwhile, the British relation to France was pent-up by the Coalition Wars. The wish for patriotism and unity became central to the British zeitgeist and are prominently present in Agincourt. A Romance.. James' personal predisposition and this striving for patriotism are present in the novel, especially since the Battle of Agincourt remains central to British patriotism even in the 21st century and is one of the most commonly known battles of the Hundred Years' War. The novel is not historically accurate even for the history of the 19th century and is written from a biased point of view favouring the English side of events. Many historical events are presented differently than historians in the 21st century now do. The narrative points towards English superiority above the French and stresses the patriotic relevance of the events. Shakespeare's Henry V deals with the same topic and is considered Shakespeare's most patriotic work. It may have inspired this novel. The structure and characters show similarities, and both works have the intention of presenting a narrative that strengthens English patriotism.

James' novels were read frequently but critiqued by literature experts and contemporaries. Agincourt. A Romance. was as well known in the 19th century as the rest of his novels but has lost its relevance since then. Little information is available anymore and most prints to be found are editions from the 19th century, whereas his other famous works remained more well known in the 20th and 21st century.

== Contents ==
Agincourt. A Romance follows the protagonist Richard of Woodville, a young man of high social status. When traveling through the woods at night, the protagonist meets Hal of Hadnock. The two men have a mutual understanding of honour and chivalry and visit Richard's uncle, Sir Philip Beauchamp, a well-known knight. During their stay, Hal of Hadnock invites Richard to go on travels with him. However, Catherine Beauchamp, another resident of the house, gets murdered before Richard and Hal can start traveling. Her fiancé Henry Dacre is the main suspect in the eyes of most residents, but Richard thinks Sir Simeon of Roydon to be the murderer. Before proof for the suspicions can be collected, a message arrives for Hal of Hadnock calling him back to London. A few days afterwards, Richard receives an invitation to London to the coronation of Hal of Hadnock who is revealed to be Henry V. In addition to the invitation, Richard is told to deliver a letter to a man named Sir John Grey in Ghent, and afterwards travel to the court of Burgundy. The messenger Ned Dyram accompanies Richard to London.

After the coronation in London, Sir Simeon of Roydon is seen killing a man. Richard tries to intervene and rescues the man's niece, Ella Brune. After hearing Richard's testimony, the King sentences Simeon to pay Ella Brune a high sum of gold and banishes him into exile outside of England. Ella falls in love with Richard for saving her, but he does not reciprocate the love as he wants to marry Mary Markham. Before going on his journey to France, Richard proposes to Mary. She replies that he first has to ask her father for approval, yet she does not reveal who her father is. When Richard finally starts his journey, Ella sneaks onto the ship and secretly follows Richard.

After arriving in Nieuport, the group travels to Ghent. Richard discovers Ella among the other travellers and promises to bring her to her relatives in Ghent. Ned Dyram quickly falls in love with Ella but she is not interested in his company. Richard finds Sir John Grey and delivers the letter from the king. He discovers that Sir John Grey is Mary's father who lived in exile. He gives Richard the permission to marry his daughter if he proves worthy and honourable. Afterwards, Richard visits the Count of Charolois and helps the Count's father, the Duke of Burgundy, escape from Paris to Lille. Richard saves the Duke's life in an ambush, in return the Duke names Richard one of his squires.

Meanwhile, Ella has found her relatives. Sir Simeon of Roydon has arrived in Ghent and seeks revenge on Ella and Richard. He tricks Ella into joining a gathering of a heretic worshippers to get her captured and burnt on the stake. When returning to Ghent, Richard immediately hears the news. He rescues Ella and discovers that Ned Dyram is a traitor who cooperated with Simeon. Richard returns on his travels through Flanders until he gets captured by the Count of Vaudemont. Two years pass and Richard hears rumours of worsening internal conflicts in France, as well as between France and England. Richard awaits that his French friends or King Henry pay the ransom, but nothing happens. Finally, Richard is allowed to send one message and asks Sir John Grey and Mary to pay the ransom and he is rescued.

When returning his travels through the North of France, Richard hears about terrible rumours. When meeting King Henry V again, he confronts Richard with the allegations. Allegedly, he has refused orders by the King that told him to return to England and serve in the English army. In addition to that, he is charged with treason as he was seen following the French army and doing crimes. Richard wants to prove the allegations wrong, but the King has to leave to prepare for the Battle of Agincourt which takes place the next day. He desperately wants to join the English forces but the King refuses his offer. The next day, when the battle begins, Richard is freed from his prison by Henry Dacre, who wants to fight in the battle to prove his honour. He partakes in the Battle and confronts the knight who pretended to be him. After the battle, it is revealed that it was Simeon of Roydon stole Richard's armour and committed all the crimes in his name. Simeon stole the letters that the King wrote to Richard, calling him back to London, so the king forgives Richard. John finally grants him the permission to marry Mary. Simeon and Ned Dyram get charged with treason and it is revealed that Simeon did in fact try to murder Catherine Beauchamp, thus proving Henry Dacre's innocence. Catherine however survived the attack and had secretly joined a convent. Ella Brune reveals that she witnessed the attack, which is why Simeon tried to attack her in London. She also joins Catherine's convent while Mary and Richard finally marry.

== Historic accuracy ==
The dates and order of historically relevant events in the novel are accurate but the protagonists and story are fictional. Even though the novel's name stems from the Battle of Agincourt, most of the book is centred around the personal fates of the characters. The historical events are played out in the background of the story, as usual for historic fiction. The actual battle only takes place in the last chapters.

James extensively describes the geography of France and Belgium, as well as the city of Ghent, demonstrating knowledge he gained from his own travels. He includes accurate descriptions of the lives of important historic figures such as Philip the Good and Henry V, going as far as describing details of the person's face. On topics like late medieval fashion or architecture, where the author lacks expertise, he gives vague descriptions and leaves the details to the readers' imagination.

Even though the setting is in late medieval times, the dialogues as well as narration of the novel are written in the style of language as spoken in the 19th century. Nevertheless, on rare occasions the characters use medieval-style language. This change in wording happens rarely and inconsistently. The protagonist often refers to verses written by Chaucer and medieval songs and poems are quoted to achieve the readers' immersion in the setting.

James' personal background gives the novel a biased point of view on the Hundred Years' War. Oftentimes, the chivalry and strength of the English knights and King are stressed. The people of Flanders are described as primitive and France is presented as an internally torn country full of conflict and deceit. The narrator often mentions the decline of honour and chivalry in France and opposes it with the English protagonist's actions which are honourable and selfless. James mentions that during the battle of Agincourt the English army was outnumbered by the French in 1:5 as commonly found in English accounts of the battle, but historians in the 21st century believe that the ratio was closer to 1:1.5.

While Henry V achieved great successes for England, his personality is described as unchivalrous and ruthless. James however chose him as a central chivalrous anchor point for the story.

"Henry was peculiarly a thoughtful monarch. [...] But those who will inquire [...] will find a meditative spirit, though a quick one; a warm heart, though a firm one; a rich and lively imagination, though a clear and vigorous judgement."

In direct contrast to James' romanticised descriptions as a wise, fair and chivalrous king, Henry V had a bad reputation and proceeded mercilessly. During his campaigns in France he ordered execution of all prisoners after the Battle of Agincourt, and during the siege of Rouen he did not allow women and children to leave the city, resulting in death by starvation.

== Reception ==
Sir Walter Scott, known for being one of the major early authors writing historic novels, praised James' writings. However, he is not thought to be a remarkable successor of Scott in the eyes of literature experts. The general reputation of him in the literature world was not positive because of the high frequency in which he published novels.

Critics have claimed his writing style to be not particularly good but have agreed that he possess a certain talent for narration. Despite the criticisms, his works were read frequently in the 19th century and can be found in many private and public book collections.

Agincourt. A Romance. is one of the most popular works by James. It is recognised in numerous collections and catalogues of historic novels. The book has been described as filled with historic facts and similar to Shakespeare's Henry V. His descriptions of the regions of Burgundy and Flanders as well as the historical celebrities he included in the novel have been positively mentioned. His ability to write about chivalry as in Agincourt. A Romance. has been praised by historians and readers. That, however, also is a common criticism because the topic of the book is similar to his other works. Critical voices made fun of his usage of the opening where two chivalrous horsemen who travel together, because he started many of his works, like Agincourt. A Romance. with this plot device.

After the early years of the 20th century, there was little to no interest in the novel anymore. The Forgotten Books publishing initiative arranged a reprint in 2018. The novel was first published as a collection in 1844, later editions were published in three volumes. The division of the volumes does not make a difference for the plot as the divisions are not set to favour or underline the plot.
