= George Payne Rainsford James =

English novelist and historical writer

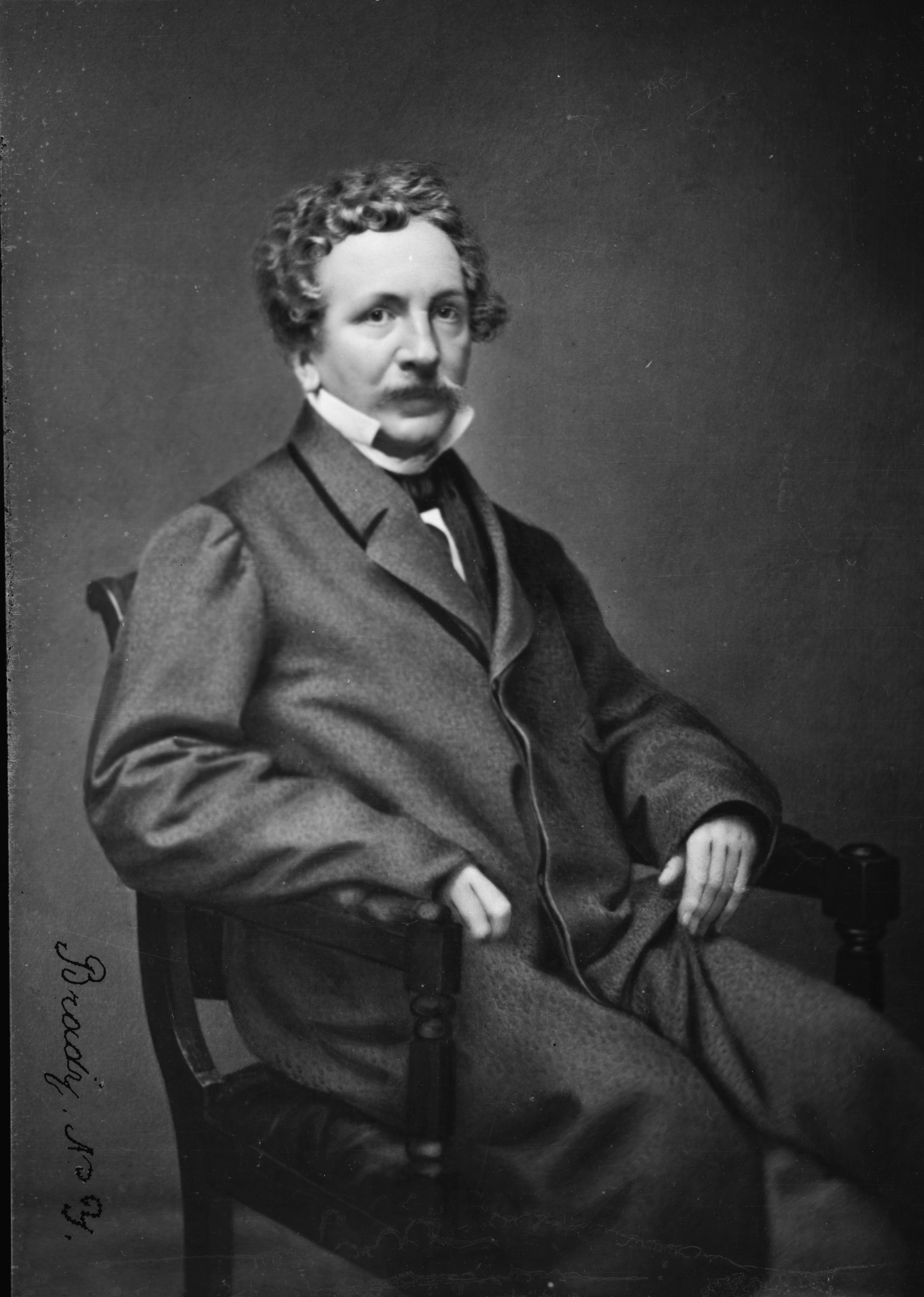
- Portrait by Mathew Brady
- Born: 9 August 1799; London, England
- Died: 9 June 1860 (aged 60); Venice, Italy
- Children: C. L. James
- Writing career
- Notable works: Richelieu; Ticonderoga; The Smuggler; Philip Augustus

George Payne Rainsford James (9 August 1799 – 9 June 1860), was an English novelist and historical writer, the son of a physician in London. He was for many years British Consul at various places in the United States and on the Continent. He held the honorary office of British Historiographer Royal during the last years of William IV's reign.

== Early life ==
George Payne Rainsford James was born in St George Street, Hanover Square, London in 1799. His father was a physician who had served in the navy and was in America during the Revolutionary War, serving with Benedict Arnold in the Battle of Groton Heights.

James attended the school of the Reverend William Carmalt in Putney. He developed a love of languages, including Greek, Latin, Persian and Arabic. He also studied medicine as a young man, but his inclinations led him in a different direction. He wanted to go into the navy, but his father was against it, due to his own naval experiences, finally allowing him to join the army. James served for a short time in the army as a lieutenant during the Hundred Days, and was wounded in a small action following The Battle of Waterloo. He travelled extensively, visiting France and Spain soon after the abdication of Napoleon. These early travels gave him the idea for his novel Morley Ernstein.

== Career ==
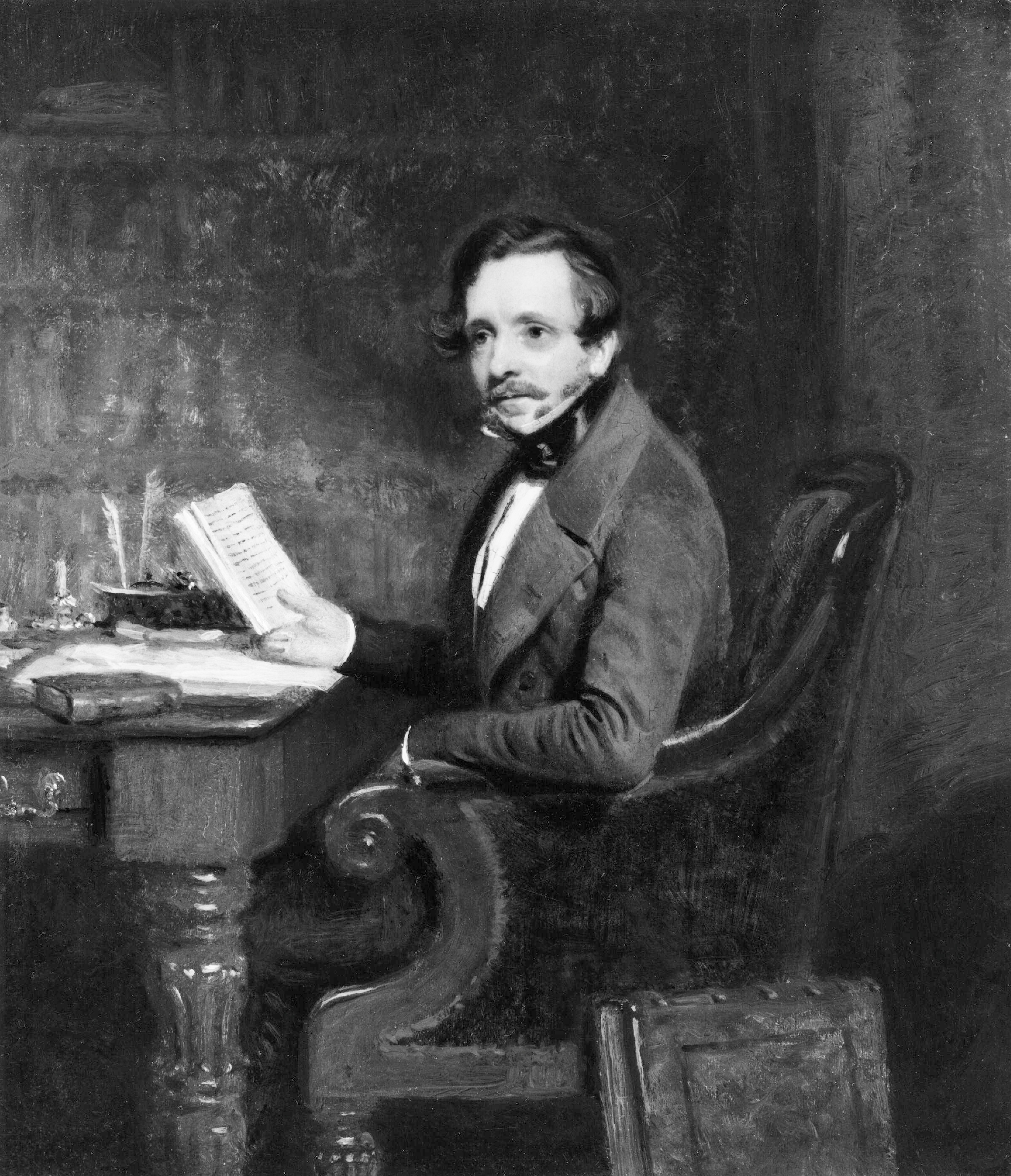
Portrait of James by Stephen Pearce

In 1825, he wrote his first and probably his best-known novel, Richelieu: A Tale of France, which was not published until 1829. After reading Richelieu, which had been given to him by a friend, and after receiving a letter from James, Walter Scott advised him to take up literature as a profession. He was also given encouragement by Washington Irving.

In 1828, he married Frances Thomas, the daughter of Honoratus Leigh Thomas, an important physician. After their marriage they lived in France, Italy, and Scotland. They had two children, including C. L. James. His wife survived him by 31 years, dying in Wisconsin in 1891.

He was appointed Historiographer Royal during the last years of William IV's reign and published several official pamphlets. During this period he lived with his wife at Oxford Cottage in Marlow.

In 1842, he lived at Walmer and was frequently a guest of the Duke of Wellington at Walmer Castle. In 1845 he went to Germany, partly for recreation and partly to gather material for his writings. On his return to England, he lived for some time in Farnham, Surrey.

In July 1850, he left England and travelled to New York, where he rented Charles Astor Bristed's house at Hell Gate. In 1851 he took a house at Stockbridge, Massachusetts, where he later bought property and made some efforts at farming. In 1852 he was appointed British Consul at Norfolk, Virginia. In 1856 the consulate was moved to Richmond. His novels Ticonderoga and The Old Dominion, written at this time, were set in the United States. In 1858 he was transferred to Venice, Italy, partly due to failing health, where he was appointed Consul General. In April 1860, he became seriously ill. He died in June 1860 from a stroke. He was buried in the cemetery at Isola di San Michele. The epitaph on his gravestone was written by his friend Walter Savage Landor. The epitaph reads:

"George Payne Rainsford James.
British Consul General in the Adriatic.
Died in Venice on the 9th day of June, 1860.
His merits as a writer are known wherever the English language is, and as a man they rest on the hearts of many.
A few friends have erected this humble and perishable monument."

== Works ==
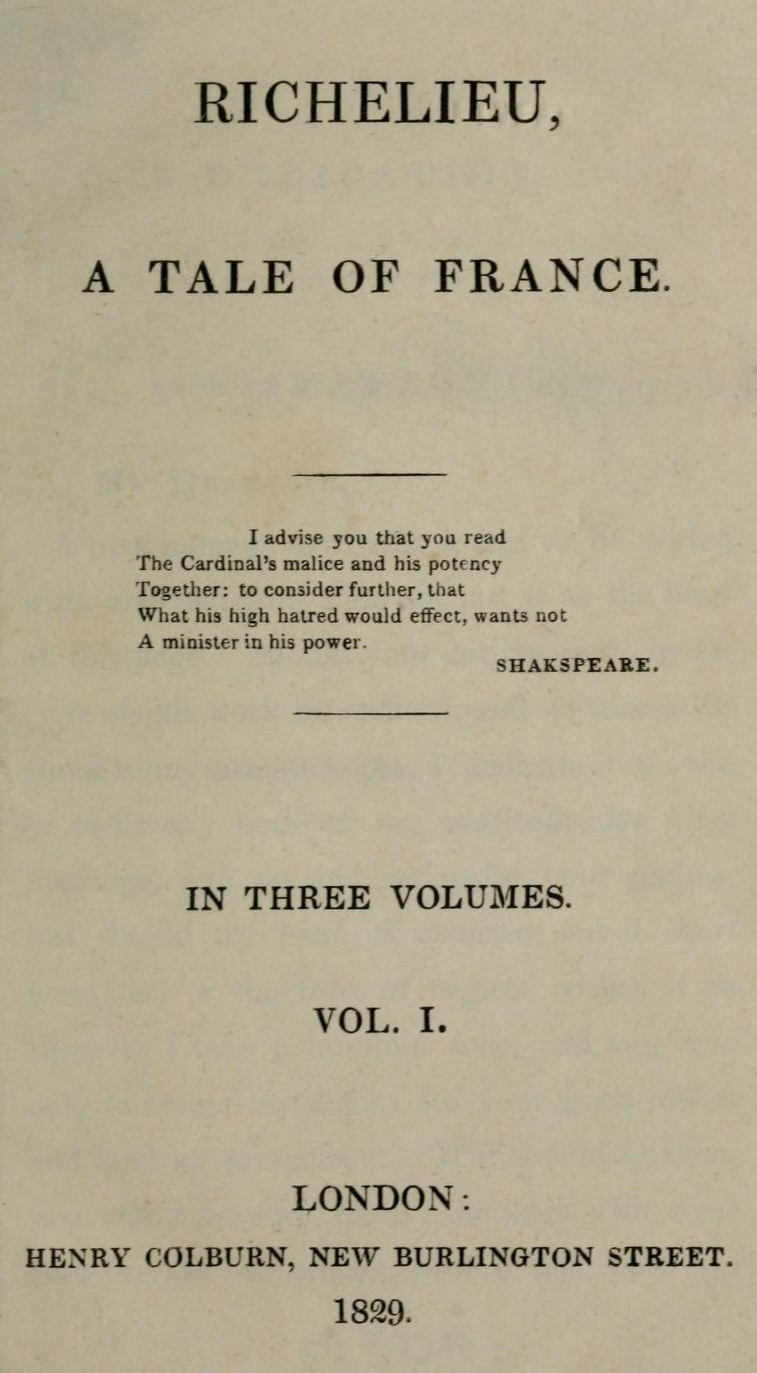
First edition title page of Richelieu

At an early age he began to write romances, and continued his production with such industry that his works reach to 100 volumes, much of it published by Henry Colburn. For 30 years hardly a year went by that he failed to turn out at least one novel, and usually two or more, most of them "three-deckers" (three-volume). Describing himself as a follower of Sir Walter Scott, he may have produced more sheer verbiage than his mentor, chiefly historical fiction (61 titles in 158 volumes). This excessive production was fatal to his permanent reputation; but his books had considerable immediate popularity. Their titles are:

Novels:

- Adra, or The Peruvians (1829)
- Richelieu: A Tale of France (3 volumes, 1829)
- Darnley, or, The Field of the Cloth of Gold (3 volumes, 1830)
- De l'Orme (3 volumes, 1830)
- Philip Augustus, or The Brothers in Arms (3 volumes, 1831)
- Bertrand de la Croix, or The Siege of Rhodes (series 1831, book 1841)
- Henry Masterton, or The Adventures of a Young Cavalier (3 volumes, 1832)
- The String of Pearls (2 volumes, 1832)
- Delaware, or The Ruined Family (3 volumes, 1833)
- Mary of Burgundy, or The Revolt of Ghent (3 volumes, 1833)
- The Life and Adventures of John Marston Hall (3 volumes, 1834)
- My Aunt Pontypool (3 volumes, 1835)
- The Gipsy (3 volumes, 1835)
- One in a Thousand; or, the Days of Henry Quatre (3 volumes, 1835)
- The Desultory Man (3 volumes, 1836)
- Attila (3 volumes, 1837), novel about Attila the Hun.
- The Robber (3 volumes, 1838)
- Henry of Guise, or The States of Blois (3 volumes, 1839)
- The Huguenot: A Tale of the French Protestants (3 volumes, 1839)
- Charles Tyrell, or The Bitter Blood (1839)
- The Gentleman of the Old School (3 volumes, 1839)
- The King's Highway (3 volumes, 1840)
- The Man at Arms, or Henri de Cerons (1840)
- Corse de Leon, or The Brigand (3 volumes, 1841), novel set in 16th Century France.
- The Ancient Regime (3 volumes, 1841)
- The Jacquerie, or The Lady and the Page (3 volumes, 1841)
- Morley Ernstein, or The Tenants of the Heart (3 volumes, 1842)
- The Commissioner, or De Lunatico Inquirendo (anon., 1843)
- Forest Days (3 volumes, 1843)
- The False Heir (3 volumes, 1843)
- Eva St. Clair and Other Collected Tales (2 volumes, 1843)
- Agincourt (3 volumes, 1844)
- Arabella Stuart (3 volumes, 1844)
- Rose d'Albret, or Troublous Times (3 volumes, 1844)
- Arrah Neil, or Times of Old (3 volumes, 1845)
- The Smuggler (3 volumes, 1845)
- Beauchamp, or The Error (ser. 1845-6; 3 volumes, 1848)
- The Stepmother, or Evil Doings (privately, 1845)
- Heidelberg (3 volumes, 1846)
- The Castle of Ehrenstein (3 volumes, 1847), novel set in 13th Century Germany
- A Whim and Its Consequences (3 volumes, 1847)
- The Convict (3 volumes, 1847)
- Russell: A Tale of the Reign of Charles II (3 volumes, 1847)
- Margaret Graham (ser 1847; 2 volumes, 1848)
- The Last of the Fairies (1848)
- Sir Theodore Broughton, or Laurel Water (3 volumes, 1848)
- Gowrie; or, the King's Plot (1848)
- Thirty Years Since; or, the Ruined Family (1848)
- The Forgery, or Best Intentions (3 volumes, 1849)
- John Jones' Tales for Little John Joneses (2 volumes, 1849)
- The Woodman: A Romance of the Times of Richard III (3 volumes, 1849)
- The Old Oak Chest (3 volumes, 1850)
- Henry Smeaton: A Jacobite Story of the Reign of George I (3 volumes, 1851)
- The Fate (3 volumes, 1851)
- Revenge (3 volumes, 1852)
- Adrian, or The Clouds of the Mind (2 volumes, 1852) (with Maunsell Bradhurst Field)
- Pequinille (3 volumes, 1852)
- The Bride of Landeck (serial 1852, book 1878)
- Agnes Sorrel (3 volumes, 1853)
- The Vicissitudes of a Life (3 volumes, 1853)
- Ticonderoga, or The Black Eagle (3 volumes, 1854)
- Prince Life (1856)
- The Old Dominion, or The Southampton Massacre (3 volumes, 1856)
- Leonora d'Orco (3 volumes, 1857)
- Lord Montagu's Page (3 volumes, 1858)
- The Cavalier (1859)
- The Man in Black: An Historical Novel of the Days of Queen Anne (1860)

Historical works:

- The History of Chivalry (1830)
- Memoirs of Great Commanders (3 volumes, 1832)
- The History of Charlemagne (1832)
- A History of the Life of Edward the Black Prince (2 volumes, 1836)
- Memoirs of Celebrated Women (ed. by, 1837)
- The Life and Times of Louis XIV (4 volumes, 1838)
- Letters Illustrative of the Reign of William III from 1696 to 1708 Adressed to the Duke of Shrewsbury by James Vernon, Esq., Secretary of State (3 volumes, 1841).
- Dark Scenes of History (3 volumes, 1849)

Other:

- The Ruined City (poetry, privately, 1828)
- Blanche of Navarre (play, 1839)
- Camaralzaman (fairy drama, 1848)
- A Book of the Passions (1852)
