= Home, Washington =

Unincorporated community in Washington, United States

Home
- Unincorporated community (CDP)
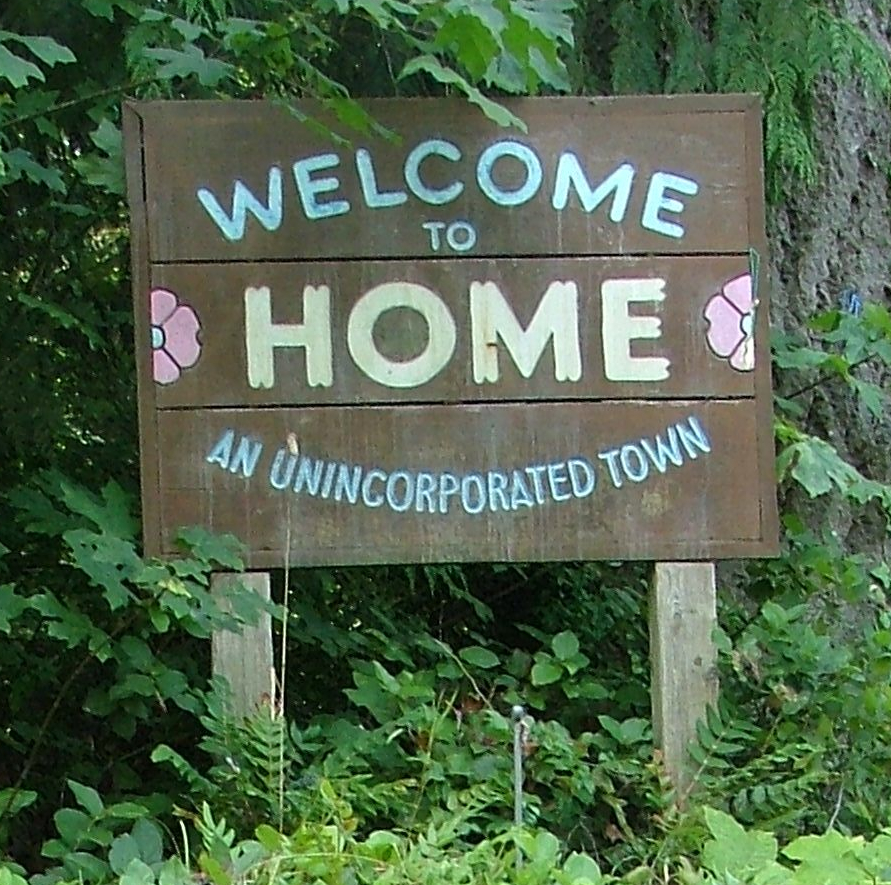
- The Home Welcome Sign

- Location within the state of Washington
- Coordinates: 47°17′50″N 122°45′33″W
- Country: United States
- State: Washington
- County: Pierce
- Elevation: 171 ft (52 m)

Population (2010)
  - Total: 1,377
- Time zone: UTC-8 (Pacific (PST))
  - Summer (DST): UTC-7 (PDT)
- ZIP code: 98349
- Area code: 253
- GNIS feature ID: 2584984

Home is a census-designated place in Pierce County, Washington, United States. As of the 2020 census, Home had a population of 1,543. The community lies on the Key Peninsula and borders the waters of Carr Inlet, an extension of Puget Sound. Home is now primarily a town of beach homes, although around the turn of the 20th century, it was considered a model, utopian community of anarchists.

== History ==
=== Settlement ===
After the failure of the industrial cooperative colony Glennis located east of Eatonville, three former Glennisites—George H. Allen, Oliver A. Verity, and B. F. O'Dell—set out in the summer of 1895 into Puget Sound on a rowboat they built themselves to find an isolated location for a new community. Home was one of about two hundred similar communities that sprung up in America in the late 1800s.

They decided upon Von Geldern Cove (also known as Joe's Bay) as the site for their new Home Colony, which would be an intentional community based on anarchist philosophy. The founders purchased 26 acres (110,000 m^{2}) there at $7 an acre, working odd jobs to pay for it. By 1896, their families had joined them and cabins were constructed.

By 1898 a land buying corporation was set up called the Mutual Home Association, whose Articles of Incorporation and Agreement stated their purpose as "to assist its members in obtaining and building homes for themselves and to aid in establishing better social and moral conditions." Land was apportioned to those who became members of the Association, agreeing to its anarchist ideals and to pay for their lot. The title to each member's land would stay with the Association; however this was changed in 1909. The Association also held title to a meeting hall, called Liberty Hall, and a trading post.

=== Land plots ===
When Home was plotted in 1901 it had increased in size to 217 acres (0.88 km^{2}) and had become home to anarchists, communists, food faddists, freethinkers, nudists, and others who did not fit in with mainstream society. Elbert Hubbard, anarchist Emma Goldman, and national communist leader William Z. Foster visited and gave lectures.

Some high-profile anarchists and free thinkers lived, raised families and wrote about the free thinking anarchist movement in Home. Such individuals brought their share of scandal and intrigue to the community. One such figure was Gertie Vose, who once lived in Portland and contributed to The Firebrand (alongside other notable anarchists like Jay Fox and Emma Goldman). Her move to the Home colony was thought to be motivated by her son, Donald Vose. He was said to be a shy, lonely kid and Gertie thought a move to the anarchist friendly area would improve his social skills and make him more comfortable with her beliefs. Gertie quickly established her place in this community by contributing to one of Home's newspapers, The Discontent, and by organizing meetings and entertaining visitors. Gertie Vose also became good friends with fellow anarchist and writer, Emma Goldman. They kept in touch for many years and Goldman wrote about her friendship with Gertie and her less amiable relationship with Donald. Donald Vose was a less harmonious addition to the community which contrasted with his mother's flourishing role in the colony. He was described as "irresponsible, lazy and bumblingly inept at everything he tried." Home was showing signs of splintering as people with differing views and ideology began to separate and disperse.

Following the assassination of President McKinley by anarchist Leon Czolgosz in 1901, the community came under scrutiny from outsiders, especially newspapers in nearby Tacoma. Inflammatory articles led to threats being made by a vigilante committee called the Loyal League formed by members of the Grand Army of the Republic, who planned to invade the colony by steamboat and "put it to the torch." They were stopped when the steamboat owner refused to take them.

=== Comstock Act ===
In 1902, after charges of violation of the Comstock Act resulting from an article advocating free-love published in the local anarchist newspaper Discontent: Mother of Progress, Home's post office was closed by postal inspectors and moved two miles (3.2 km) to the smaller town of Lakebay. The people of Home were labeled "vicious" by officials, and thus people like the citizens of Tacoma, Washington believed the community was detrimental to moral values.

The radical feminist Lois Waisbrooker was a resident of Home during a later phase of her controversial career (1901 to 1904), and was involved in the prosecution that led to the closing of the Home post office. Emma Goldman was also a radical ideologue who studied the works of people like Walt Whitman and thus disseminated the idea of "sexual intermediacy". Waisbrooker and Goldman and other women like them exemplified feminist ideology that fit into the larger anarchist canon that had developed in 20th century America.

=== Divisions ===
The Association became divided into disagreeing factions called "nudes" and "prudes." The two factions were coined in a series of editorials in the Home newspaper The Agitator in which editor Jay Fox defended Homeites arrested in 1911 for nude swimming—and nude swimming in general—against those in Home who had reported them to county authorities. This division between conservative and more liberal factions of the colony contributed greatly to the colony's decline in 1919. Because of these editorials, Fox was charged with the misdemeanor of encouraging or advocating disrespect for law or for any court or courts of justice and jailed for two months. Not only was the colony fracturing from within but public opinion outside of Home was less than favorable. Many people saw the disagreement totally arbitrary seeing as it was discussing people being nude in public and that was socially unacceptable outside of the community. The Agitator ran stories that dealt with things like the Hay Market riot in Chicago and other instances of injustice against the anarchist movement. When Jay Fox moved from Home, WA to Chicago he took his paper with him and renamed it The Syndicalist.

The debate over Home's clothing-optional policies was a common theme in communities like this across the country. In most cases the free-love lifestyle that anarchists strived for came into conflict with the strict cultural norms of the mainstream. These communities "withered as a result of public hostility as well as internal disagreement over ideology and practice."

As people in the colony became more divided on their views of anarchism the colony began to fracture. The "nudes and prudes" debate made it clear that the colony was not living in a cohesive utopia, but rather a complicated collection of similar people who could not fully reconcile their differing interpretations of anarchism. In 1919 the Association was dissolved and the anarchist community, as it was, dissolved as well. The July 27, 1919, Omaha Daily Bee reported the event as "Free Love Colony Dissolved by Court."

== Demographics ==
Historical population
Census	Pop.	Note	%±
2010	1,377		—
2020	1,543		12.1%
U.S. Decennial Census; 2000 2010

Home first appeared as a census designated place in the 2010 U.S. census.

=== Racial and ethnic composition ===
Home CDP, Washington – Racial and ethnic composition Note: the US Census treats Hispanic/Latino as an ethnic category. This table excludes Latinos from the racial categories and assigns them to a separate category. Hispanics/Latinos may be of any race.
Race / Ethnicity (NH = Non-Hispanic)	Pop 2010	Pop 2020	% 2010	% 2020
White alone (NH)	1,232	1,305	89.47%	84.58%
Black or African American alone (NH)	4	4	0.29%	0.26%
Native American or Alaska Native alone (NH)	15	14	1.09%	0.91%
Asian alone (NH)	11	16	0.80%	1.04%
Native Hawaiian or Pacific Islander alone (NH)	9	2	0.65%	0.13%
Other race alone (NH)	1	19	0.07%	1.23%
Mixed race or Multiracial (NH)	62	111	4.50%	7.19%
Hispanic or Latino (any race)	43	72	3.12%	4.67%
Total	1,377	1,543	100.00%	100.00%

=== 2020 census ===
As of the 2020 census, Home had a population of 1,543. The median age was 49.3 years. 19.3% of residents were under the age of 18 and 25.3% of residents were 65 years of age or older. For every 100 females there were 108.5 males, and for every 100 females age 18 and over there were 106.8 males age 18 and over.

0.0% of residents lived in urban areas, while 100.0% lived in rural areas.

There were 611 households in Home, of which 20.3% had children under the age of 18 living in them. Of all households, 58.9% were married-couple households, 14.9% were households with a male householder and no spouse or partner present, and 19.6% were households with a female householder and no spouse or partner present. About 24.7% of all households were made up of individuals and 13.6% had someone living alone who was 65 years of age or older.

There were 775 housing units, of which 21.2% were vacant. The homeowner vacancy rate was 0.4% and the rental vacancy rate was 8.1%.

Racial composition as of the 2020 census
Race	Number	Percent
White	1,325	85.9%
Black or African American	6	0.4%
American Indian and Alaska Native	17	1.1%
Asian	16	1.0%
Native Hawaiian and Other Pacific Islander	2	0.1%
Some other race	27	1.7%
Two or more races	150	9.7%

== See also ==
- Home Colony
