= Lois Waisbrooker =

American novelist

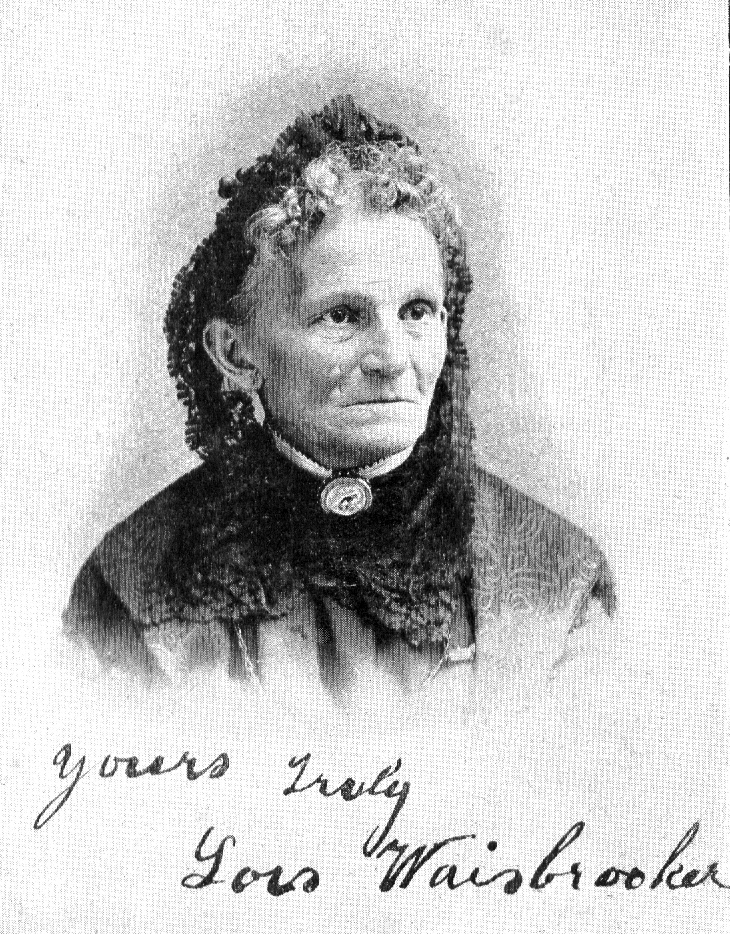
- A photo that Waisbrooker mailed to her daughter around 1900
- Born: Adeline Eliza Nichols; February 21, 1826; New York, United States
- Died: October 3, 1909 (aged 83); Antioch, California, United States
- Resting place: Oak View Memorial Park
- Occupation: Writer
- Children: Abner Fuller, Maria Hawkins
- Writing career
- Subject: Feminism
- Notable work: A Sex Revolution

Lois Waisbrooker (21 February 1826 – 3 October 1909) was an American feminist author, editor, publisher, and campaigner of the later nineteenth and the early twentieth centuries. She wrote extensively on issues of sex, marriage, birth control, and women's rights, plus related areas of radical thought like free speech, anarchism and spiritualism. She is perhaps best remembered for her 1893 novel A Sex Revolution.

== Biography ==
Born Adeline Eliza Nichols in upstate New York, she grew up in poverty there and in Ohio. She had little formal education, and worked for some years as a domestic servant. Beginning at the age of seventeen, an illegitimate pregnancy, a forced marriage, a quick widowhood and a brief second marriage inspired her devotion to feminist values. She converted to spiritualism and became a "trance speaker" at spiritualist gatherings. By 1863 she had adopted the name Lois Waisbrooker, and began a practice of lecturing and journalism that continued through the remainder of her life. "She wrote passable poetry, but didactic prose was her forte." She helped to organize the Boston Social Freedom Convention in the 1870s, and served as an official of the American Labor Reform League in 1882–83.

Waisbrooker founded and edited three periodicals, Our Age, Foundation Principles, and Clothed with the Sun (sometimes even setting the type and operating the printing press). In 1892 she "served as acting editor of an anarchist free-thought weekly titled Lucifer, the Light-Bearer" when its former editor Moses Harmon went to prison. Like other radical writers of the period, she was prosecuted under the Comstock Act that prohibited the sending of obscene materials through the U.S. mail. She was involved in public controversy, and was the subject of condemnation and ridicule, throughout her career. In August 1894, the Topeka State Journal ran a story about her under the derisive headline "A Queer Old Woman Thinks She Has a Mission to Perform."

Waisbrooker spent a late phase of her career at the experimental community of Home, Washington. She arrived there early in 1901; local residents built her a small house. While there, Waisbrooker became involved in another legal controversy. She and the local postmistress, Mattie D. Penhallow, were arrested and charged with disseminating obscene material — the material in question being an article in Clothed with the Sun titled "The Awful Fate of Fallen Women." A jury convicted Waisbrooker; a sympathetic judge sentenced her to the minimum penalty, a fine of $100. (Penhallow was acquitted, though the U.S. Post Office subsequently closed the Home post office.)

Waisbrooker continued her activities to the end of her life, despite advancing age and worsening health. She left Home for Denver in 1904, and died in Antioch, California where she is buried along with son, Abner Fuller in Oak View Memorial Park," at the age of eighty-three. "Penniless at the time of her death in 1909, Lois Waisbrooker had spent over forty years promoting the twin ideas of assertive womanhood and female sexuality as a positive power."

== Selected works ==
- Mayweed Blossoms (1871), novel
- The Sexual Question and the Money Power (1873)
- Nothing Like It, or Steps to the Kingdom (1875), novel
- From Generation to Regeneration (1879)
- Helen Harlow's Vow (1884), novel
- Perfect Motherhood; or Mabel Raymond's Resolve (1890), novel
- The Fountain of Life; or The Threefold Power of Sex (1893)
- The Occult Forces of Sex (1893)
- A Sex Revolution (1893), novel
- The Wherefore Investigating Company (1894), novel
- Anything More, My Lord? (1895)
- The Temperance Folly; or Who's the Worst? (1900)
- My Century Plant (1903)
- Women's Sense of Power (1903)
- Eugenics; or Race Culture Lessons (1907)

== Bibliography ==
- Braude, Ann (2001). Radical Spirits: Spiritualism and Women's Rights in Nineteenth-Century America (2nd ed.). Bloomington: Indiana University Press. ISBN 025334039X. OCLC 47785582.
- LeWarne, Charles Pierce (1975). Utopias on Puget Sound, 1885–1915. Seattle: University of Washington Press. ISBN 0295953438. OCLC 462226666.
- Passet, Joanne E. (2003). Sex Radicals and the Quest for Women's Equality. Urbana: University of Illinois Press. ISBN 025202804X. OCLC 50041426.
- Passet, Joanne E. (2006). "Power through Print: Lois Waisbrooker and Grassroots Feminism". In Danky, James Philip; Wiegand, Wayne A. (eds.). Women in Print: Essays on the Print Culture of American Women from the Nineteenth and Twentieth Centuries. Madison: University of Wisconsin Press. pp. 229–250. ISBN 0299217833. OCLC 223384996.
- Shone, Steve J. (2019). "Lois Waisbrooker: Anarchist Opponent of Marriage". Women of Liberty. Studies in Critical Social Sciences. Vol. 135. Brill Publishers. pp. 161–184. doi:10.1163/9789004393226_007. ISBN 978-90-04-39045-4. S2CID 211971796.
- Sears, Hal D. (1977). The Sex Radicals. Lawrence: Regents Press of Kansas. doi:10.2307/j.ctv1p2gm83. ISBN 0700631194. JSTOR j.ctv1p2gm83. OCLC 647007433. S2CID 245662027.
