= James Ferdinand Morton Jr. =

American anarchist (1870–1941)

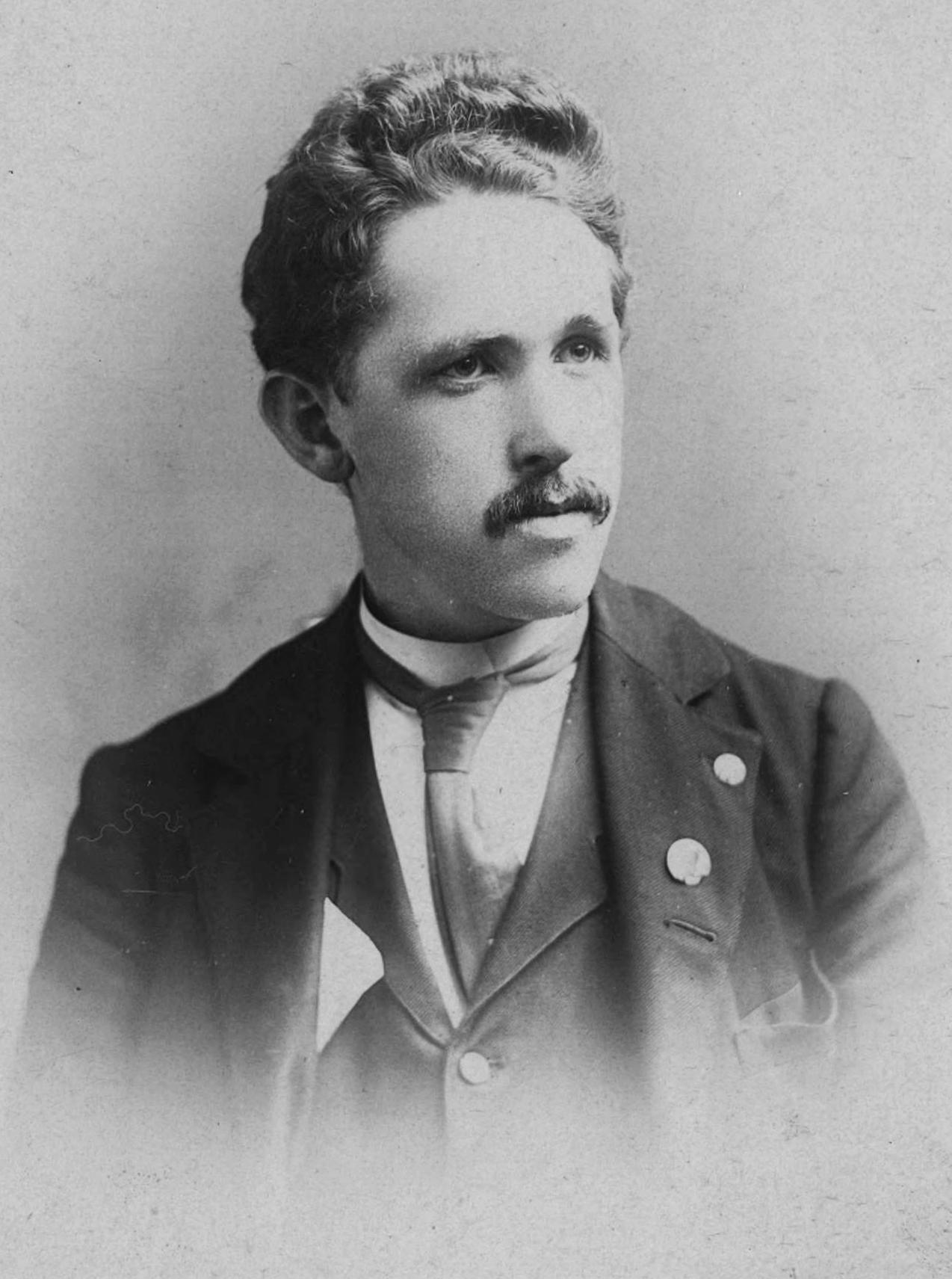
- Morton Jr., c. 1900
- Born: October 18, 1870; Littleton, Massachusetts, United States
- Died: October 7, 1941 (aged 70); Jersey City, United States
- Education: Harvard University
- Relatives: Samuel Francis Smith

James Ferdinand Morton Jr. (October 18, 1870 – October 7, 1941) was an anarchist writer and political activist of the 1900s through the 1920s especially on the topics of the single tax system, racism, and advocacy for women. After about 1920 he was more known as a member of the Baháʼí Faith, a notable museum curator, an Esperantist, and a close friend of H. P. Lovecraft.

== Biography ==
=== Early years ===
Morton was born in Littleton, Massachusetts, lived in Andover, New Hampshire. His family reached back to the pilgrims landing in 1620, his grandfather was Rev. Samuel Francis Smith. A newspaper article from 1906 refers a little to his youth - that he worked as a "newsboy, bootblack, an organ blower, and an employe (sic) in a jelly factory". In 1892, he earned Bachelor of Arts and a Master of Arts degree from Harvard University, simultaneously, in Classical Philology, earning a "Gorham Thomas" scholarship, graduated cum laude and was a member of the honors society Phi Beta Kappa. He was a classmate of W.E.B. Du Bois and carried on some correspondence with him. He gained skills in Greek, Latin and French. The Harvard Secretary's Report of 1896 noted by then he was in the temperate Independent Order of Good Templars, animal rights oriented New England Anti-Vivisection Society and had campaigned under the People's Party.

Even at this early period he was actively involved in the amateur journalism movement, appearing in newspaper coverage of the developing practice in 1891, and elected President of the National Amateur Press Association (NAPA) in 1896. In his earlier days in New England he explored a number of alternatives to mainstream culture.

=== Anarchism and the tour to the West and back ===
He became a supporter of anarchism - having a special affinity for individualist anarchism, free love, and freethought - and went on a cross-country speaking tour 1899-1900 to the West supporting these ideas. Several of these talks appeared in newspapers. By 1901 he was active on the West Coast. When living in the West Morton wrote for or edited various anarchist journals such as Free Society, Discontent, The Demonstrator, and Emma Goldman's Mother Earth as well as the Freethought periodical Truth Seeker and lived at the Home, Washington anarchist commune which had been raided though Morton was not arrested, and was still present when the news of the assassination attempt against US President William McKinley arrived. Morton's writings clarified that he favored a "non-retaliatory" anarchism. In 1904 he made his way back to the East coast and a talk of his on anarchism, free-thought, and morality was carried in several newspapers.

=== Initiatives ===
As early as 1903 Morton was visibly against racism in his writing for the anarchist Distcontent. He campaigned actively for civil rights for blacks, challenged productions like Thomas Dixon's The Clansman, and in 1906 published The Curse of Race Prejudice, which the National Association for the Advancement of Colored People's The Crisis listed among its suggested reading materials in many editions over the years. Morton served on various committees of the NAACP in the 1910s, and continued to speak on the issue across several years. In 1922 he contributed to a conference on the history of racism.

In the earlier half of his life, Morton took an interest in the subject of single-tax as originated by Henry George . It was one of the topics he spoke across several years about. In 1916-17 Morton totaling 68 lectures in 54 cities, with over 2000 in attendance. Many of these made the newspapers. He also advocated for taxing churches.

A third topic was of lasting concern to Morton—the facets of advocacy for women, including suffrage, feminism, and conventions on limitations on sexuality and contraception.

In addition to particular topics that had his voice across the decades, and practicing law for some years in New York and Massachusetts, he wrote or gave talks on a wide range of topics:

- racism against red-heads
- then recent antisemitism in Russia
- conventionality in religion and politics,
- Thomas Paine
- tyranny in the postal system (which was echoed in more than one newspaper,)
- work's rights and social reform
- funerals in general and of Thaddeus B. Wakeman in particular
- baseball games on Sunday
- "Mob spirit"
- contraception
- radicalism

=== Literature and friendships ===
In addition to various individual topics he was also invested in several over a long term. From about 1915, he was a prominent member of the Blue Pencil Club of Brooklyn (founded 1908 Albertus Minton Adams (1878 – 1952) President of the Blue Pencil Club; Hazel Bosler Pratt (1888 – 1927), Secretary.), publisher of The Brooklynite, and named after the traditional Blue pencil editor's corrections, and supported appreciation of literature in a number of talks. His close friendship with the author H. P. Lovecraft is today perhaps the feature of his biography which arouses the most interest. Morton promoted Lovecraft to be president of National Amateur Press Association in 1922. Blue Pencil Club of Manhattan published Blue Pencil Magazine.

=== Association with Lovecraft ===
Morton was a key member of the Kalem Club, the close circle of friends around Lovecraft in New York City in the mid 1920s. During the early part of that period he lived in Harlem, New York City, a predominantly black neighborhood.

=== Paterson Museum ===
Morton was an active student of mineralogy and a leading member of the Thomas Paine Natural History Association. In the mid 1920s he was offered and took the post of head museum curator at the new museum at Paterson, New Jersey – then a regional locus of anarchism – where he would build a mineralogy collection which was admired nationally and internationally. This job enabled him to marry the writer Pearl K. Merritt in 1934; the couple had no children. Morton became a leader in the American Association of Museums, and a leading member of the New York Mineralogical Club. Locally he enjoyed walking with the radical Paterson Rambling Club.

In 1934, he was interested in his family history and wrote congratulating a local historian on research important to overcoming some limits in his own research. An avid walker, he died in 1941, due to being struck in the back by a moving car while walking to a meeting .

== Religion ==
Beginning in 1907 Morton also published a series of articles under "Fragments of a Mental Autobiography" in a journal named Libra which outlines his religious background beginning with Baptist family heritage, goes through Unitarian relatives, and Theosophy exploration, (he was president of the Boston Theosophical Society in 1895) and placing Jesus and the Buddha among those on the highest level of his admiration even if he found fault with all scripture and organized religion. In this period Morton was an avid "evangelist" atheist and often spoke out against religion but he had already encountered the Baháʼí Faith which:

At first, I regarded it with amused interest, as one of many little cults; but gradually I found myself drawn into closer and closer relation with it. There was a wideness in its attitude which I had not found elsewhere. It held place for what was best in Christianity, Judaism, Mohammedanism, Buddhism, Freethought and all the rest, warring with none of these, but finding each of them definitely serviceable to the larger spiritual plan of the universe. It is the great reconciler and harmonizer. I have discovered in it an abiding-place which I had sought in vain for many restless years. It increases, rather than decreases, my eagerness to continue the investigation of truth without bias, and to labor energetically in all branches of human service. I have no fault to find with the differing conclusions of other truth-lovers, and am ready to work with them all as occasion offers. (near 1910)

He became a convert to the religion in later life. Morton is visibly in Baháʼí circles from 1915 on the program of presenters at Green Acre, a Baháʼí center of lectures and conferences from about 1912, and got into some debates with a critic of the religion circa 1916. He also served as an alternate delegate from New York to a national convention of the religion in 1918. He received two letters (aka "Tablets") from ʻAbdu'l-Bahá, then head of the religion, in 1919 which were later published in the Baháʼí journal Star of the West. Morton increasingly gave public talks related to the religion from the late 1910s through the 20s and into the 30s and during the same period addressed the topic of Esperanto sometimes as a Bahá'í specifically. He was vice-president of the Esperanto League for North America, and was the lead teacher of that language at the Ferrer Center (a long-running anarchist school) in New York City.

=== Similarities, parallels, and connections ===
It is worth noting that other Bahá'ís were interested in the single tax movement originated around the ideas of Henry George, and other ideas also in common with the young Morton. Among these were Paul Kingston Dealy and Marie Howland. Both had joined the religion some years earlier around 1897–1898. Dealy and Howland had joined the religion in different cities - Chicago, the first national community of Baha'is in the US in the case of Dealy, and Howland in Enterpririse Kansas, the second such in the States. Dealy had also previously run for office under the People's Party circa 1895 but in Chicago. Howland and her husband had also been interested in the ideas of sexual freedom against the norms of the day and the cultural situation of women though Howland's husband soon died. Both Dealy (and his family) and Howland, independently, also moved to commune of sorts although this one was different, at Fairhope, Alabama, circa 1898–1899. There, Howland established the first library and worked on the first newspaper, another interest of Morton's, of the colony. Another Bahá'í couple - Honoré Jaxon and Aimée Montfort show similar interests as well. Jaxon had been an anarchist a decade before and been involved in another commune of sorts at Topolobampo, Mexico, and then joined the religion about 1897 in Chicago shortly before Aimée. They had married and pursued worker's rights involvements though their long term interested turned to Canada. It is not known if Morton, Dealy, Howland, Jaxon, or Montfort ever knew of each other. Additionally Thornton Chase, called the first Bahá'í in the West, was a student of Morton's grandfather, Rev. Samuel Francis Smith, in his youth.

== Writings ==
- James Ferdinand Morton. The Philosophy of the Single Tax.
- Enrico Malatesta; James F. Morton Jr (June 1900). Anarchy, by Enrico Malatesta, and Is it all a dream?. Free Society Library. Vol. 5. San Francisco: A. Isaak. (note Morton's part is just pages 44 to 47.)
- James Ferdinand Morton (1900). Do You Want Free Speech?. self published.
- Morton, James F. Jr. (1906). The curse of race prejudice. self published.
- James Ferdinand Morton; John Eleazer Remsburg (1916). Exempting the Churches. The Truth seeker company.
