= The Indispensable Enemy =

1975 book by Alexander Saxton

The Indispensable Enemy: Labor and the Anti-Chinese Movement in California
- Author: Alexander Saxton
- Genre: History
- Publication date: 1975
- ISBN: 978-0520029057

The Indispensable Enemy: Labor and the Anti-Chinese Movement in California (ISBN 978-0520029057) is a 1975 labor and California history book by Alexander Saxton which became one of the founding texts of Asian American studies. The book has been described as "represent[ing] the best example of writing in the historical materialist tradition within Asian American Studies" and "[t]he model of historical writing" that discusses the "history of workers and racism", including both interracial "unity but also the limits of that unity."
