= Syndicalist League of North America =

Former trade union of the United States

The Syndicalist League of North America was an organization led by William Z. Foster that aimed to "bore from within" the American Federation of Labor to win that trade union center over to the ideals of Revolutionary syndicalism.

== Organizational history ==
=== Background ===
The origins of the group go back to Foster's observations of European syndicalism in 1910-1911. Intrigued initially by the French CGT, he arrived in Paris in 1910. He spent the next year and a half studying the French syndicalist union, attending its 1910 Toulouse congress and actively participating in a CGT railroad strike. He also studied the labor and socialist movements in Germany and tried (without success) to represent the Industrial Workers of the World at the August 1911 Budapest congress of the International Secretariat of National Trade Union Centres. He was impressed with how the French syndicalists had organized themselves as a militant cadre within the mainstream unions and became involved with the masses' everyday struggles, whereas the German syndicalists, the Free Association of German Trade Unions, maintained an isolated existence outside the official unions leaving the latter in the control of reformist officials.

Foster attempted to win the IWW over to this position at its September 1911 convention. There he won only a few delegates, including Earl Ford and J.W. Johnstone, to his plan. Seeing that they could not carry the convention, and fearing that if a "boring form within resolution" were defeated it would squash their momentum, Fosters sympathizers decided to "campaign" for the idea among the membership, including running for editorship of an important Wobbly newspaper. Foster spent the next months on a 6,000 mile "hobo" campaign setting up groups of sympathizers within IWW locals throughout the United States and Canada. However the successful Lawrence strike in January 1912 revitalized faith in the IWW's dual unionist policy and support for a radical change of direction within the group declined.

=== Establishment ===
The circles set up by Foster began to secede from the IWW and enter the mainstream unions on their own; the first group to do so being the local in Nelson, British Columbia, headed by Jack Johnstone. In January 1912, Foster established the Syndicalist Militant Minority League in Chicago. Other chapters sprang up in Kansas City, Omaha, Minneapolis, St. Louis, Denver, Seattle, Tacoma, Vancouver, San Francisco, Los Angeles and several other cities in the West and Mid-West. While most of these chapters were composed of ex-Wobblies, the SLNA also included a group of ex-Anarchists who had previously been residents of a Utopian commune called Home in Washington state. This group would include Jay Fox, editor of the communes newspaper, The Agitator, which he moved to Chicago in October 1912 and renamed The Syndicalist. This became the SLNAs national organ. Earl Ford and Foster would spend three months in the summer of 1912 working on Syndicalism, the groups 50 page manifesto, while working as canvasmen in a traveling "tent theater" in Southern Indiana and Illinois.

With too few resources to hold a national convention, the Chicago group, with the consent of the other locals, acted as a national body, and in September 1912 announced the formation of the Syndicalist League of North America, wrote a constitution and statement of principles, and elected an executive board with Foster as National Secretary. The group had a very decentralist structure, each unit setting its own dues, publishing its own paper and working out its own policies. The national office did not receive any national dues, and depended on the sale of its journal, pamphlets and voluntary contributions.

Foster and Fox set up "headquarters" at a rooming house run by Lucy Parsons at 1000 South Paulina St., in a heavily Slavic district of Chicago's near west side. The Chicago branch included J. A. Jones, Samuel Hammersmark and Joseph Manley, as well as Foster's wife Esther Abramowitz. Most of these had been part of the Chicago anarchist scene for years. In Chicago, the group maintained a presence within the Brotherhood of Railway Carmen of America, which Foster belonged to, as well as the painters, barbers and retail clerks union, laying the basis for the progressive element which would lead the packing and steel organizing campaigns in subsequent years. One of the most important strikes that the Chicago syndicalists would become involved in was the strike on the Illinois Central Railroad and Harriman, which had already begun in September 1911 and ended in June 1915, after the SLNA broke up. The Syndicalist league took an active part in this strike while it existed and in its leaders, Carl E. Person, defense after he shot a company agent in self-defense. The rank-and-file led strike demanded the federation of unions working on the same line and joint contracts.

=== Development ===
One of the strongest locals of the SLNA was the Kansas City Syndicalist League. It announced that it was in the process of formation in January 1913, and published its own paper The Toiler from October 1913 to January 1915. Earl Browder, eventual general secretary of the Communist Party USA, became this chapters secretary in February 1914. In fall 1914, with the SLNA disintegrating, the KCSL became the Workers Educational League. During the brief time of its existence, the KCSL exercised influence in the Cooks, Barbers and Office Workers unions and, according to Foster, controlled the local Central Labor Council.

The local in St. Louis was headed by J. A. LaBille and published The Unionist from July 9, 1913, to December 15, 1913. It led AFL strikes of taxi drivers and waiters.

In Omaha the local published another Unionist, and the group was headed by B. McCafferey and David Coutts. In San Diego the SLNA published at least two issues of a periodical called The International in August 1914.

Tom Mooney was a member of the SLNA in 1912, and met Foster at the organization's "headquarters" that year en route to an International Molders and Foundry Workers Union of North America convention in Milwaukee. At the convention Mooney organized a "militant minority" of seventy left-wing delegates into a propaganda organization for conducting syndicalist propaganda within the union, under SLNA auspices. Mooney chartered four chapters of this International Foundry Workers Educational League in San Francisco.

In Los Angeles the SLNA "stoutly defended" the McNamara brothers, who had confessed to dynamiting the Los Angeles Times building. William J. Burns, a labor spy, set up a network in Home, Washington to try to implicate Jay Fox in the matter, and was able to recruit a young anarchist, Donald Voss, into his spy ring. With Voss' help he was able to apprehend Matt Schmidt and Dave Kaplan, who were the McNamaras alleged accomplices.

The SLNA also maintained links with the British Industrial Syndicalist Education League. They sponsored a US speaking tour by Tom Mann, and sent a delegate to that groups First International Syndicalist Congress.

=== Dissolution ===
The Syndicalist League of North America did not last long. The Syndicalist ceased publication in September 1913, followed by St. Louis Unionist, and, finally, the Toiler in January 1915. In the summer of 1914 Fox and Foster had become a vice-president and an organizer, respectively of the International Union of Timber Workers in Washington state and both relocated there for a few months. Fox would return to Home Colony that November. This would mark the end of the SLNA as an organization. Remnants of it would form the International Trade Union Educational League in January 1915.
