= Mount Zion Cemetery (Los Angeles, California) =

Cemetery in Los Angeles, California

- Interactive map of Mount Zion Cemetery

Details
- Established: 1916
- Location: Los Angeles, California
- Country: United States
- Coordinates: 34.021°N 118.179°W
- Type: Public
- Owned by: uncertain
- Find a Grave: Mount Zion Cemetery

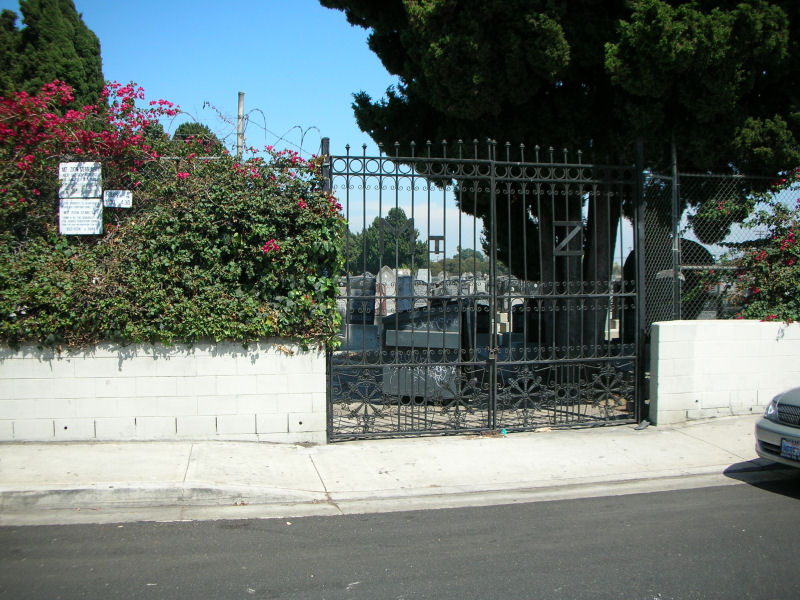
Entrance to Mount Zion Cemetery

Mount Zion Cemetery is a Jewish cemetery at 1030 S. Downey Road, East Los Angeles, California.

== Famous interments ==
Mount Zion has Yiddish writer Lamed Shapiro. Also buried at Zion are Samuel Weisberger – President of Congregation Talmud Torah abt 1909 (aka after 1911 Breed Street Shul), Jacob Tanenbaum – Founder of the Talmud Torah congregation Etz Jacob. The congregation was named in his honor., Morris Soriano – Founding member of the Avat Shalom Society. Early member Congregation Avat Shalom...first Sephardic congregation in Los Angeles. Max Babin and Lena Hauph – Owners of the first Kosher restaurants in Los Angeles. American comedienne phenom Fanny Brice was originally buried at Home of Peace cemetery but in 1999, after the new Memorial Gardens area was unveiled at Pierce Bros, her ashes were moved to Westwood Memorial.

== Current condition ==
Mount Zion's last burial was in the 1990s, possibly early 2000. Mount Zion has since been minimally restored. It is still in poor condition although in far better condition than in 2012. In 2013 the Friends of Mount Zion Cemetery performed basic restoration with money raised primarily in the Orthodox LA Jewish community.

== Gallery ==
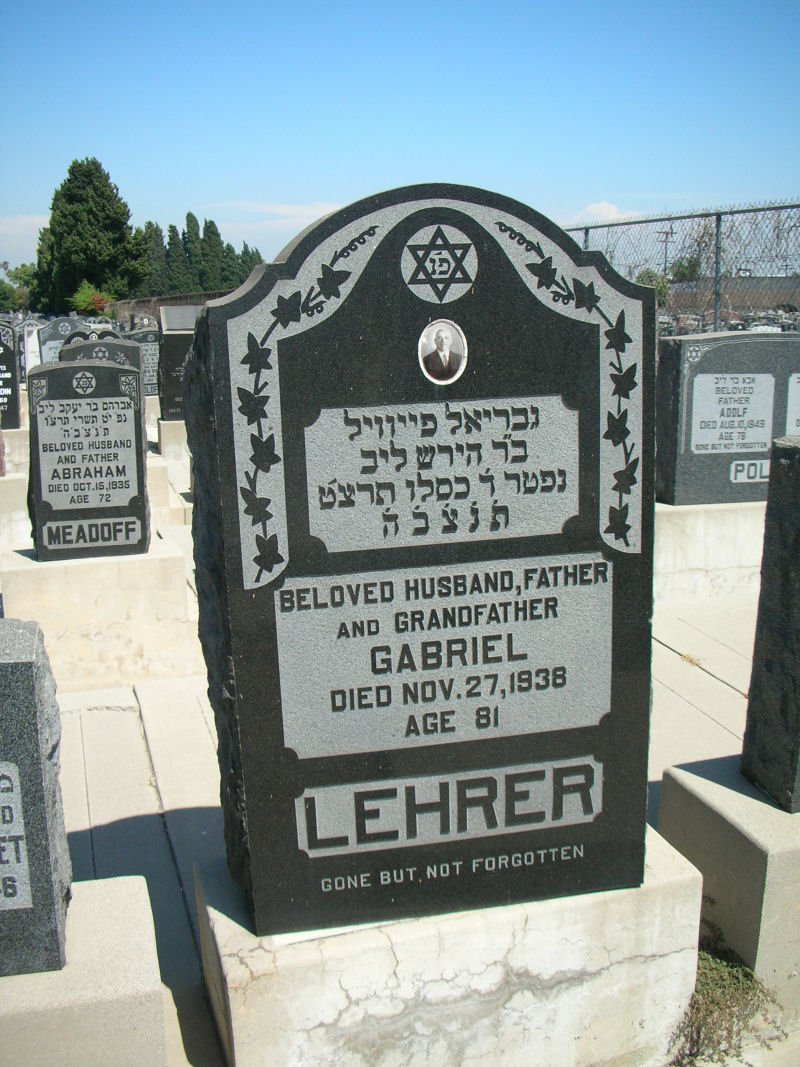
The grave marker of Gabriel Lehrer in Mount Zion Cemetery

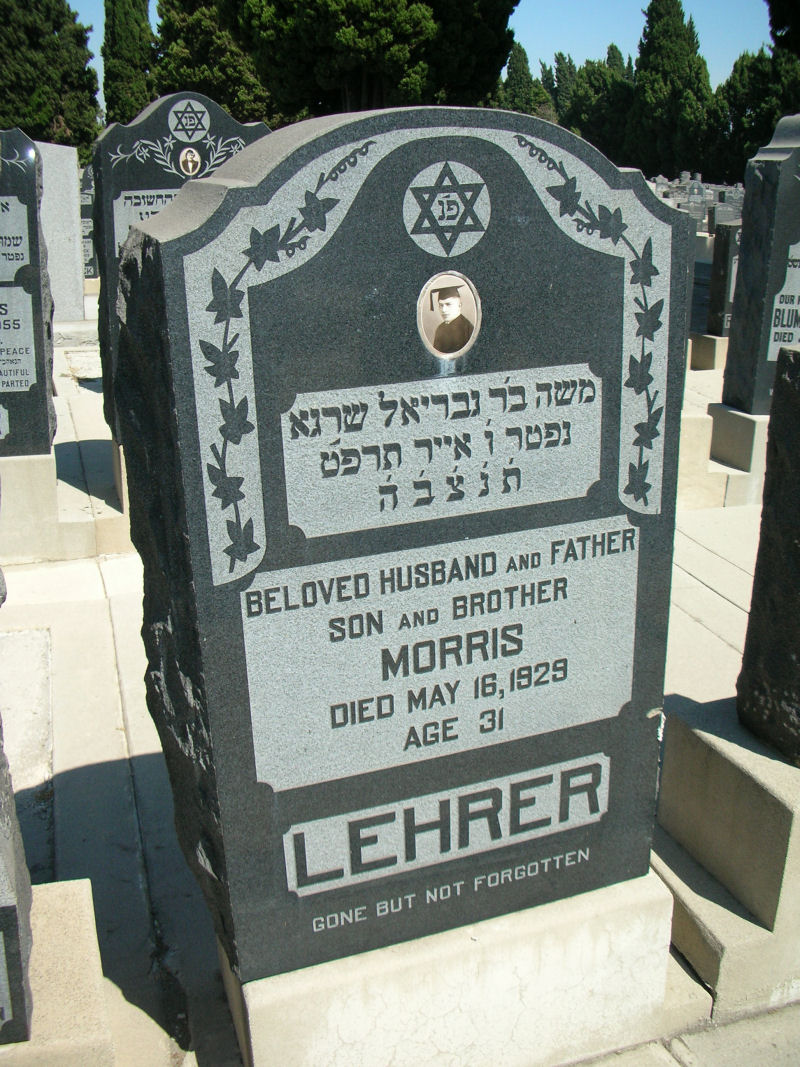
Grave marker of Morris Lehrer in Mount Zion Cemetery
