= Lakebay, Washington =

Unincorporated community in Washington, United States

- Unincorporated community
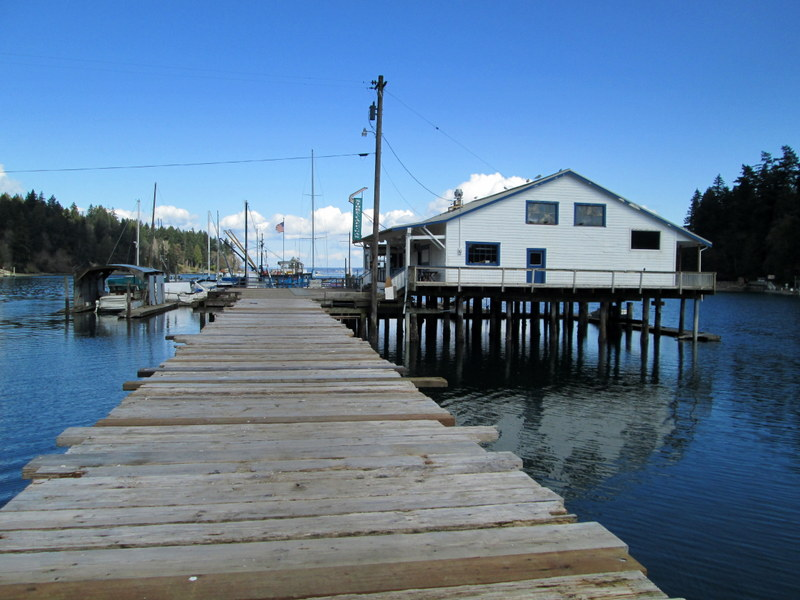
- Lakebay Marina

- Location within Washington (state)
- Coordinates: 47°15′25″N 122°45′30″W
- Country: United States
- State: Washington
- County: Pierce
- Elevation: 43 ft (13 m)
- Time zone: UTC-8 (Pacific (PST))
  - Summer (DST): UTC-7 (PDT)
- ZIP code: 98349
- Area code: 253
- GNIS feature ID: 1513142

Lakebay is an unincorporated community in Pierce County, Washington, United States. Lakebay is located at the head of Mayo Cove on the east side of the Key Peninsula, 1 mile (1.6 km) south of Home. Lakebay has a post office with ZIP code 98349.

The community derives its name from nearby Bay Lake.

== Notable people ==
Rose Payne (1909–1999), transplant geneticist, was born in Lakebay
