= Alexander Saxton =

American novelist (1919–2012)

- Born: July 16, 1919; Great Barrington, Massachusetts, U.S.
- Died: August 20, 2012 (aged 93); Lone Pine, California, U.S.

Academic work
- School or tradition: Leftist
- Main interests: Asian American studies, Labor History, Racism
- Notable works: Indispensable Enemy (1975); The Great Midland (1948)

Alexander Plaisted Saxton (July 16, 1919 – August 20, 2012) was an American historian, novelist, and university professor. He was the author of the pioneering Indispensable Enemy (1975), one of the founding texts in Asian American studies.

== Life and works ==
Saxton was one of two children born to Eugene and Martha Saxton, in Great Barrington, Massachusetts. His older brother was the author Mark Saxton (1914–1988). His father became the editor in chief of Harper & Brothers, and his mother taught literature at a private girls' school in Manhattan. Saxton was raised on the East Side of Manhattan; his parents were known to have famous writers over for dinner such as Thornton Wilder and Aldous Huxley. He attended Phillips Exeter Academy and Harvard (John F. Kennedy was a classmate), but dropped out in his junior year to become a laborer in Chicago. He said he wanted to see "how people live in the other America — the real America."

After dropping out of Harvard, Saxton made the intentional transition to the working class where he labored at various times as "a harvest hand, construction gang laborer, engine-wiper, freight brakeman, architectural apprentice, assistant to the assistant editor" of a union newspaper, railroad switchman and columnist for The Daily Worker. Saxton published his first novel, Grand Crossing in 1943, when he was 24 years old. His next novel was his most acclaimed, The Great Midland published in 1948. It examines the 1920s and 1930s labor movement through the lives of a man and a woman. His last novel, Bright Web in the Darkness (1958), is about two women—one white, the other Black—who meet in a factory during World War II. Saxton never returned to the novel, and, two years before his death, said that "The novel claims only a brief span in human culture and may not continue to play a key role."

While working on his novels, Saxton was a full-time organizer of maritime workers and longshoremen in San Francisco, and he also wrote prolifically for many left-wing publications. Saxton did eventually get his bachelor's degree from the University of Chicago, mainly to appease his parents. During World War II he served with the Merchant Marines. After the war, due to his left-leaning activities and with the Cold War in full swing, he found it difficult to find publishers for his fiction. At the age of 43 he returned to school, earning a Ph.D. in history from the University of California, Berkeley, and soon after became a professor at the University of California, Los Angeles. He said he was part of a generation "radicalized by the Great Depression," going on to say:

This was a group relatively small in numbers but impressively influential in its time. Whether organizing unions, advocating for civil rights or fighting fascism in Spain, all shared an urgent sense that the time had come in human history for crossing from an ethics of individual achievement, to one of moral responsibility for the social order one lived in.

Saxton was one of the founding fathers of the UCLA Asian American Studies Center and the creator of new courses in American history, including the first course on Filipino-American history and another on Film and History. He was the author of the pioneering text Indispensable Enemy (1975), one of the founding monographs in the fields of Asian American history and Asian American studies. As Claire Potter wrote in The Chronicle of Higher Education soon after his death:

He was one of the first historians to think seriously about how racial whiteness coalesced as an identity for European-descended working-class men in California; and how the demonization of immigrants from the Asian diaspora by nativist elites served the politics of capitalism in the Western United States.

Saxton taught American history at UCLA from 1968 until his retirement in 1990. He had two daughters, one who died in 1990 and another who died of cancer in April 2019. His wife Trudy died in about 2002. Saxton's death was due to a self-inflicted gunshot wound at his home in Lone Pine, California, on August 20, 2012. His daughter said her father wished to choose the time and place of his death, like other transitions in his life.

== Bibliography ==
- 1943 Grand Crossing (novel)
- 1948 The Great Midland (novel)
- 1958 Bright Web in the Darkness (novel)
- 1975 The Indispensable Enemy: Labor and the Anti-Chinese Movement in California
- 1991 The Rise and Fall of the White Republic: Class Politics and Mass Culture in Nineteenth Century America
- 2006 Religion and the Human Prospect
