= Abraham Isaak =

Russian–American anarchist

- Born: October 4, 1856; Chortitza Colony, Yekaterinoslav Governorate, Russian Empire
- Died: December 10, 1937 (aged 81)

Abraham Isaak (October 4, 1856 – December 10, 1937) was a newspaper editor and Russian-American anarchist. He was raised in the Mennonite village of Rosenthal, part of the Chortitza Colony (in present-day Ukraine, then in the Russian Empire), but later settled in the United States.

== Biography ==
Abraham Isaak was the second of 12 children born to Abraham Isaak (1832–1898) and Helena Wiebe (1835–1882).

Isaak was best known for his editing and publishing the American anarchist weeklies the Firebrand (1895–1897) and Free Society (1897–1904), Isaak was less a theorist than an activist. His acquaintances and friends included the Russian anarchists Peter Kropotkin and Emma Goldman.

Isaak came to regret his move to New York in 1904 where Free Society faced financial problems that forced its closure in November of that year. Emma Goldman's Mother Earth, which first appeared in 1906, was an attempt to fill the anarchists' subsequent literary void.

== Political and ethical beliefs ==
Isaak only twice referred to his Mennonite past in the Firebrand and Free Society. This extended quote is taken from the former:

I was born and raised in a community of Mennonites in Russia. These people settled in South Russia after the land had been taken by conquest from the Turks and obtained the privilege from the Russian to manage their own affairs, and as their religion was against civil laws they lived for about 70 years without laws or officers. (I must mention here that these people had been persecuted, executed, burned at the stake, etc. in western Europe and were considered as the lawless, just as the anarchists are today.) There were no beggars, tramps nor thieves among them, and there was never a murder committed, although there were far over 100,000. There were no drunkards yet they had a distillery in their midst and everybody had access to the "brand." There was a so-called magistrate elected by the communities `to look after the conduct and welfare of the communities,' as the government expresses it, but in the eyes of the members he was nothing but a mediator between them and the government. These people were all prosperous and happy as long as commercialism did not effect [sic] these communities. They formerly had only produced for their own use as neither cereal nor cattle were saleable. But when wheat raising became profitable, accumulation began; then some invested their money in factories and the "rich and the poor" became distinct–government stepped in, and to-day [sic] there are beggars, thieves and drunkards among them, but I have not heard of a murder yet.

Although Isaak was an ex-Mennonite, he continued to espouse many traditional Anabaptist principles such as pacifism, mutual aid and socio-economic equality that Anarchist theorists have promoted and that Isaak believed represented the best of his own Mennonite tradition.

== Later life ==
Nothing suggests Isaak resumed newspaper work. In fact, he became involved in such establishment organizations as the Farm Bureau and other civic organizations. Maria Isaak died of pneumonia on April 17, 1934; Isaak, according to his death certificate, died of acute pancreatitis on December 10, 1937. Four years before his death Isaak wrote to his friend, Harry Kelly: "First, the railroads took our pears and plums and $70 to boot; the good Lord took our citrus fruit (by frost), and two weeks ago the Bank of Lincoln closed its doors, where we had our last savings...." He concluded: "Some 30 years ago Thorsten Veblen told me in Chicago that the machine would break capitalism sooner than the efforts of revolutionists, and it seems his prediction is coming true."

== See also ==
- Anarchism in the United States
