= Free Society =

American anarchist newspaper

The Firebrand
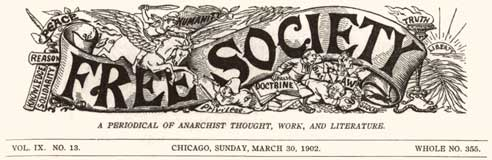
- Founder(s): Abraham Isaak, Mary Isaak
- Relaunched: Free Society
- City: Portland, Oregon; San Francisco, California
- Country: US

Free Society (1895–1897 as The Firebrand; 1897–1904 as Free Society) was a major anarchist newspaper in the United States at the end of the nineteenth and beginning of the twentieth centuries. Most anarchist publications in the US were in Yiddish, German, or Russian, but Free Society was published in English, permitting the dissemination of anarchist thought to English-speaking populations in the US.

The newspaper was established as The Firebrand in 1895 in Portland, Oregon, by the Isaak family, Abraham Isaak, Mary Isaak, and their children, along with some associates; the organization served as "the headquarters of anarchist activity on the [West] Coast".

Notable contributors include Kate Austin, Voltairine de Cleyre, Michael Cohn, Jay Fox, Emma Goldman, Lizzie Holmes, William Holmes, C. L. James, Harry Kelly, James Ferdinand Morton Jr., and Ross Winn.

== See also ==
- List of anarchist periodicals
- Christian anarchism
