= Second period =

Second period may refer to:

- Ice hockey's second period of a game
- Period 2 elements of the chemical periodic table
- Second Period of the Communist International after its Sixth World Congress (see United front and Third Period for details)
- Second Intermediate Period of Egypt
- 2nd Persian Period
- Second Persian Period
- Second period of the Great Patriotic War
- Second Temple period
- Second Stadtholderless Period
