= Communist International (magazine) =

Political magazine (1919–1943)

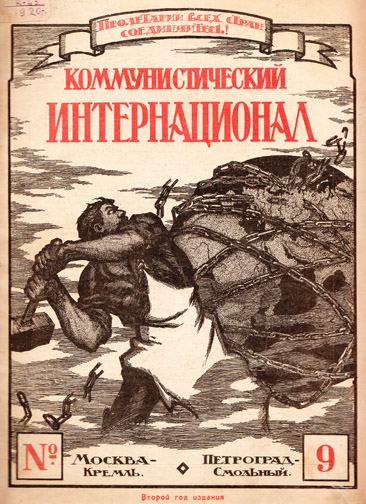
Cover of the 9th Russian issue of Kommunisticheskii internatsional, the Russian-language edition of The Communist International (1920).

The Communist International was the eponymous official magazine of the Moscow-based Communist International (Comintern). The publication was published from 1919 until 1943 in a multiplicity of languages including (but not limited to) Russian, German, English, and French. Issued irregularly, monthly, or semi-monthly depending upon the language and year, the magazine is regarded as a vital primary source for the study of the international Communist movement.

== Publication history ==
=== Establishment ===
The Communist International was a magazine launched at the March 1919 establishment of the Communist International in Moscow. The publication was intended as the official organ of the governing Executive Committee of the Communist International (ECCI), headed by its president, Grigory Zinoviev, and was initially published in the four most commonly used languages of the international Communist movement — Russian, German, English, and French.

The earliest issues of The Communist International were produced at the Comintern's offices at Smolny in Petrograd, with Zinoviev listed as the publication's editor. The first issue saw print about two months following the conclusion of the Founding Congress of the Communist International, bearing a cover date of May 1919.

The publication was originally planned to be a monthly, although by the end of 1919 it had slipped into a slightly slower and more irregular pace of production.

The large-format magazine was intended to convey news, Marxist theory, strategic ideas, and official pronouncements of the so-called "World Party," the Comintern to its supporters and sympathizers around the world, with a view to paving the way for world revolution. In the estimate of one historian, early issues of The Communist International were largely "a compendium of the arguments that Bolsheviks felt would win the working class to their cause."

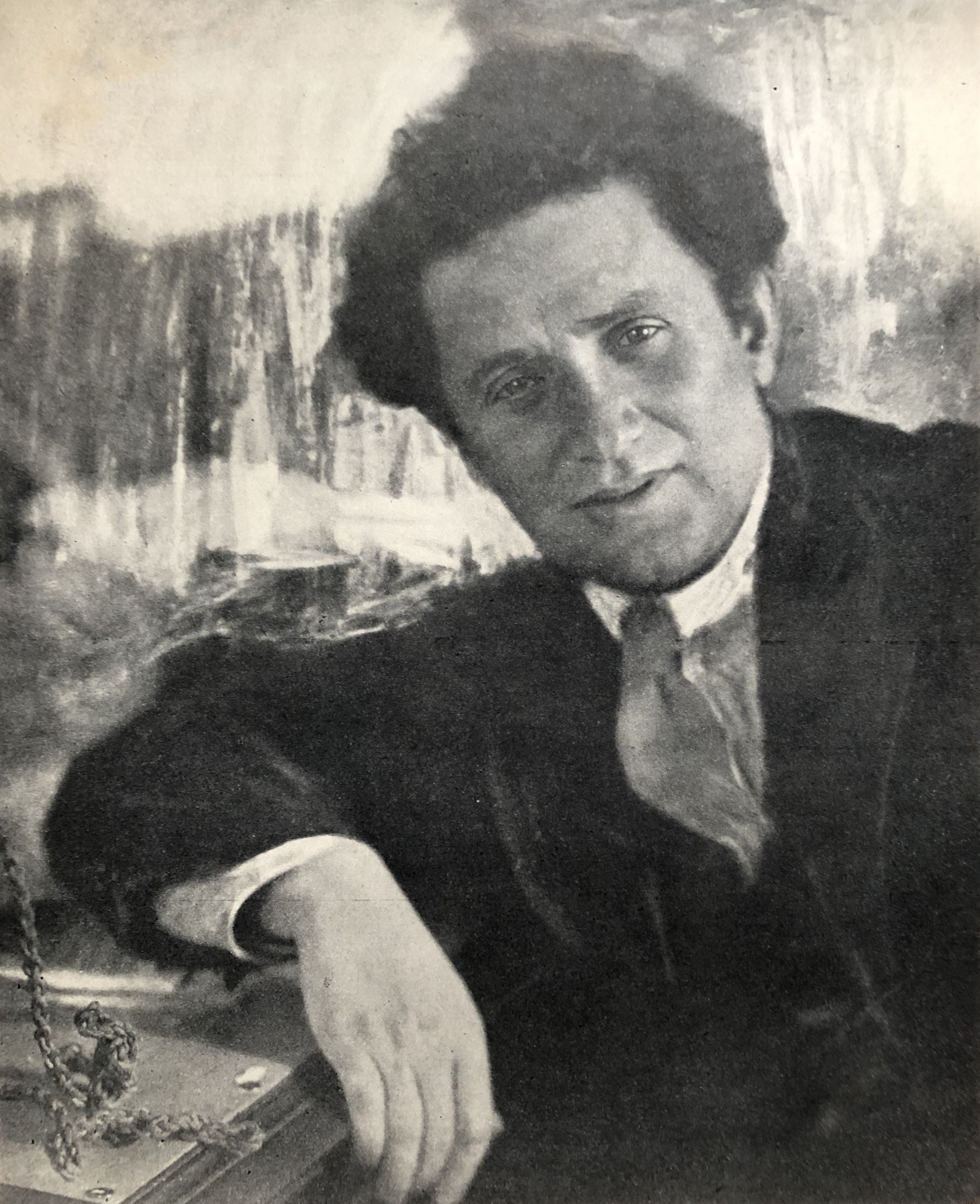
Comintern President Grigory Zinoviev was editor-in-chief of The Communist International at the time of its launch, as well as a leading contributor of content to the publication.

The leading contributor to The Communist International during its inaugural year of 1919 was Grigory Zinoviev, who contributed 11 signed pieces to the publication. Vladimir Ulianov (N. Lenin) provided an additional 7 signed pieces for the seven issues of 1919, with French Comintern functionary Victor Serge adding more.

The Communist International was hampered by the Allied blockade of Soviet Russia during its formative years, a situation which both restricted the receipt of timely news of the world revolutionary movement and which greatly constrained distribution of the printed publication. Owing to these circumstances, it was not effective as a transmission mechanism of timely news and information, a function fulfilled with greater success through the use of carefully focused radio-telegrams by the Comintern. These pioneer radio broadcasts were able to be transmitted through any physical blockade and heard in Sweden or Switzerland before being transmitted to the radical press in the United Kingdom, Germany, or elsewhere in Europe for newspaper reproduction.

The glossy and illustrated Communist International was supplemented in its intended task of spreading official documents and pronouncements of the Comintern with the September 1921 launch of a second, less elaborate and more frequent publication — the smaller-format International Press Correspondence (Inprecorr).

=== Publication schedule ===
Initial issues of The Communist International, known retrospectively as the "Old Series," were first published in Russian with direct translation of content into German and English, although not every issue of the first dozen or so (issued during the years of the Allied blockade) made it to print in English.

Beginning in the early 1920s production of the magazine in non-Russian editions was decentralized, with the English-language edition published in London and from there exported to the United States. As its availability increased, the magazine became required reading for Communist Party leaders around the world. A "New Series" of numbers for the London-produced English edition began in 1924.

Through 1925 and into 1926 the magazine appeared regularly as a monthly in both Russian and English. However, in September 1926 the Russian edition moved to a weekly frequency, with the English edition only partially following the change, moving to a semi-monthly publication schedule in 1927. This twice-a-month frequency of the English edition was maintained through September 1935, when the magazine once again moved to a monthly schedule.

Beginning in January 1934 parallel English-language editions of The Communist International were produced in London and New York City, initially with identical covers and pagination, but eventually with slightly different form and content. This situation changed dramatically at the end of 1939, following the summer signing of the Molotov–Ribbentrop Pact, paving the way for war between Nazi Germany and the United Kingdom.

=== Termination and legacy ===
The British edition of the magazine was abruptly terminated in December 1939 although a modified American magazine was permitted to appear beginning in 1940, with mention of the magazine's official status removed from the banner in favor of the words, "Edited by Earl Browder." The American edition continued to publish translations of a limited number of articles from the Russian edition but essentially served as a voice of the Communist Party, USA during its final years of existence.

The American version of the publication continued to be produced in New York through 1943, at which time the Comintern was abruptly dissolved as a wartime gesture by Joseph Stalin's Soviet Union towards his western allies in World War II and along with it the magazine by the same name.

Regarded by historians as one of the most important primary sources relating to the international Communist movement, The Communist International was reissued in multiple hardcover volumes by the publisher Greenwood Press in a 1968 as part of their series of reissues of periodicals of the American radical movement.
