= Communist International =

International communist organization (1919–1943)

Communist International Third International
- Abbreviation: Comintern
- Leader: Grigory Zinoviev (Chairman; 1919–1926); Nikolai Bukharin (de facto; 1926–1928); Dmitry Manuilsky (de facto; 1929–1934); Georgi Dimitrov (General Secretary; 1934–1943)
- Founded: 4 March 1919
- Dissolved: 15 May 1943
- Preceded by: Second International; Zimmerwald Conference
- Succeeded by: Fourth International (1938); Cominform (1947)
- Headquarters: Moscow, Soviet Union
- Newspaper: Communist International
- Youth wing: Young Communist International
- Ideology: Communism; Leninism (until 1924); Marxism–Leninism (from 1924)
- Political position: Far-left
- Anthem: "Kominternlied"

The Communist International (abbreviated as Comintern), also known as the Third International, was a Marxist political international that advocated world communism and existed from 1919 to 1943. Emerging from the collapse of the Second International during World War I, it was founded at a congress in Moscow convened by Vladimir Lenin and the Russian Communist Party (Bolsheviks) (RCP), which aimed to create a new international body committed to revolutionary socialism and the overthrow of capitalism worldwide.

Initially, the Comintern operated with the expectation of imminent proletarian revolutions in post-war Europe, particularly in the former German Empire, which were seen as crucial for the survival and success of the Russian Revolution. Its early years were characterized by attempts to foment and coordinate revolutionary uprisings and the establishment of disciplined communist parties across the globe, often demanding strict adherence to the "Twenty-one Conditions" for admission. As these revolutionary hopes faded by the early 1920s, the Comintern's policies shifted, notably with the adoption of the "united workers' front" tactic, aiming to win over the working masses from reformist socialist parties. Throughout the 1920s, the Comintern underwent a process of "Bolshevization", increasing the centralization of its structure and the dominance of the RCP within its ranks. This process intensified with the rise to power of Joseph Stalin in the Soviet Union.

The "Third Period" (1928–1933) saw the Comintern adopt an ultra-sectarian line and denounce social democratic parties as "social fascism". From 1934, the Comintern shifted to the Popular Front policy, advocating broad alliances with socialist and even liberal parties against fascism. This was formally adopted at its Seventh World Congress in 1935. The Comintern played a significant role in organizing support for the Republican side in the Spanish Civil War, including the formation of the International Brigades. However, this period also coincided with the Great Purge in the Soviet Union, during which many Comintern officials and foreign communists residing in Moscow were arrested and executed.

With the signing of the Nazi–Soviet Pact in August 1939, the Comintern again changed its line, denouncing the war between Nazi Germany and the Western powers as an "imperialist war" and abandoning its anti-fascist stance until the German invasion of the Soviet Union in June 1941. As a gesture to its Allies in World War II, Stalin unilaterally dissolved the Comintern on 15 May 1943. While its formal structures were dismantled, mechanisms of Soviet control over the international communist movement persisted and were later partially revived through the Cominform (1947–1956).

== Background ==
The Communist International, or Third International, was a direct descendant of the First International (1864–1876) and the Second International (1889–1914). The First International, of which Karl Marx and Friedrich Engels were leading figures, aimed to coordinate the proletariat in its worldwide struggle against capitalism, based on the premise that "the working men have no country" and that horizontal class allegiance would supersede vertical national divisions. By the late 19th century, however, the Western labour movement had largely abandoned the revolutionary zeal of the First International. Powerful trade unions and socialist parties emerged which, while often adhering to Marxist revolutionary theory, in practice pursued the implementation of gradual, constitutional reforms, improving the workers' lot within the existing capitalist framework. This created a manifest contradiction between revolutionary rhetoric and peaceful practice.

The Second International, created in 1889, was a looser federation of autonomous socialist parties, comprising "left", "right", and "centrist" factions, divided on issues such as bourgeois democracy, the national question, general strikes, and, crucially, war. It foundered in August 1914 on the rock of national chauvinism when most of its constituent parties chose to support their respective national governments in World War I by voting for war credits. Vladimir Lenin, a key figure in the Russian Bolshevik Party (later the Russian Communist Party, RCP), viewed this as a "sheer betrayal of socialism" and declared the Second International dead, calling for a Third International by the autumn of 1914.

During the war, anti-war socialists attempted to regroup at the Zimmerwald Conference in 1915 and the Kienthal Conference in 1916. At Zimmerwald, a divide emerged between a pacifist majority, which sought an immediate peace without annexations or indemnities, and Lenin's left-wing minority, which advocated turning the imperialist war into a revolutionary civil war. Lenin's position gained more support at Kienthal, and the Zimmerwald Left laid the ideological foundations for the future Third International.

The Bolsheviks emerged from a distinct Russian revolutionary tradition. Unlike the mass-based, reformist parties of the West, Russian revolutionaries operated in a clandestine underground, organized in small, disciplined groups of "professional revolutionaries". Drawn largely from the intelligentsia of the Russian Empire, this movement possessed a quasi-religious devotion to the cause of revolution itself, an enthusiasm that contrasted sharply with the practical, matter-of-fact nature of Western labour movements. The October Revolution of 1917 in Russia, led by the Bolsheviks, was seen by Lenin as the first act of a global drama, with European workers expected to follow suit. To achieve this, a new International, purged of reformist "traitors", was deemed an absolute necessity.

== Foundation and early years (1919–1923) ==
The Communist International was founded at a congress of revolutionaries in Moscow from 2–6 March 1919. The impetus for its creation came from the Bolsheviks' belief in the imminence of world proletarian revolution, spurred by the perceived collapse of capitalism after World War I and revolutionary upheavals across Europe, particularly the German "November Revolution". The mission of the Comintern was to build a "world party" of communists dedicated to the armed overthrow of capitalist private property and its replacement by a system of collective ownership.

=== First (Founding) Congress ===
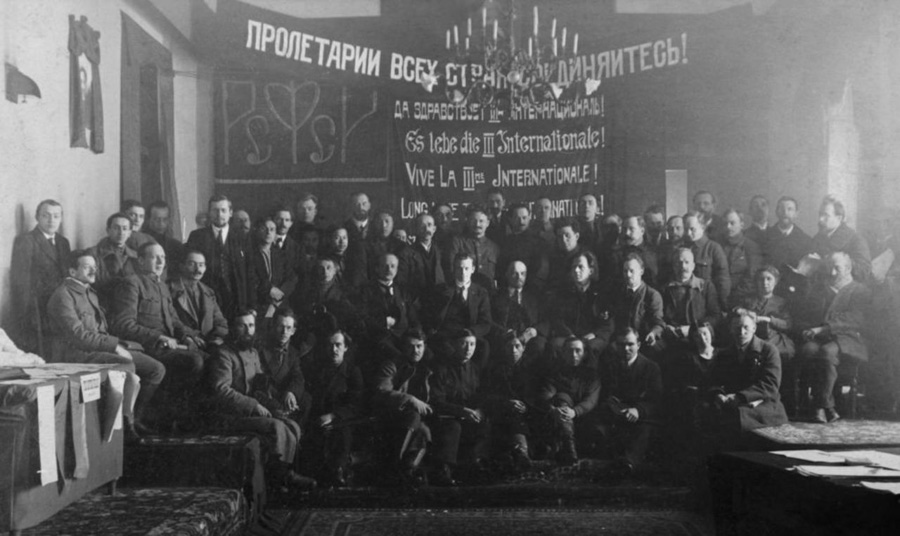
Delegates at the First (Founding) Congress, 1919

On 24 January 1919, a "Letter of Invitation to the First Congress of the Communist International" was sent by wireless from Moscow, identifying thirty-nine communist parties and revolutionary groups eligible to attend; it was deliberately timed to pre-empt the Berne Conference, held in early February by reformist socialists attempting to revive the Second International. The congress convened in the Kremlin on 2 March 1919. Of the fifty-one delegates, only nine arrived from abroad due to the Allied blockade of Russia; the rest resided in Soviet Russia, and many lacked authorized credentials. Hugo Eberlein, the delegate of the Communist Party of Germany (KPD), was mandated to oppose the immediate formation of a new International, reflecting Rosa Luxemburg's earlier concerns that a premature founding would allow the Bolsheviks to dominate the new organization. Despite Eberlein's abstention, the congress voted overwhelmingly to establish the Third International on 4 March 1919.

The principal document of the congress was Leon Trotsky's "Manifesto to the Proletariat of the Entire World", which emphasized soviets (workers' councils) as the instrument of working-class unity and action, deeming the Russian model universally applicable. It dismissed "bourgeois democracy" and reiterated Lenin's insistence on the dictatorship of the proletariat. Unusually, the Manifesto made no explicit reference to the role of national Communist Parties, instead placing its emphasis on the soviets on one hand and, on the other, the "International Communist Party" whose task was to overthrow the capitalist order. The improvised nature of the congress meant that no formal statutes or rules were adopted, but an Executive Committee (ECCI) was elected, with Grigory Zinoviev as its first President. While provision was made for foreign party representation on the ECCI, Bolsheviks predominated due to the prestige of the Russian Revolution and the weakness of foreign parties.

=== Universalisation of Bolshevism ===
The foundation of the Comintern institutionalized the split in the international labour movement between revolutionary communists and reformist social democrats. This schism was rooted in fundamentally different conceptions of the path to socialism. Karl Kautsky, a leading theoretician of the Second International, condemned the Bolshevik coup in The Dictatorship of the Proletariat (1918), arguing that socialism was inseparable from democracy and that a revolution in backward Russia could only result in a terroristic dictatorship. Lenin, in his reply The Proletarian Revolution and the Renegade Kautsky (1918), excoriated Kautsky, asserting that parliamentary institutions were a sham concealing bourgeois class rule and that "proletarian democracy is a million times more democratic than any bourgeois democracy". He proclaimed that Bolshevism could "serve as a model of tactics for all". Rosa Luxemburg, while a committed revolutionary, also criticized the Bolsheviks from a democratic standpoint, warning that their centralist organizational model would lead to a bureaucratic dictatorship over the proletariat, not of it.

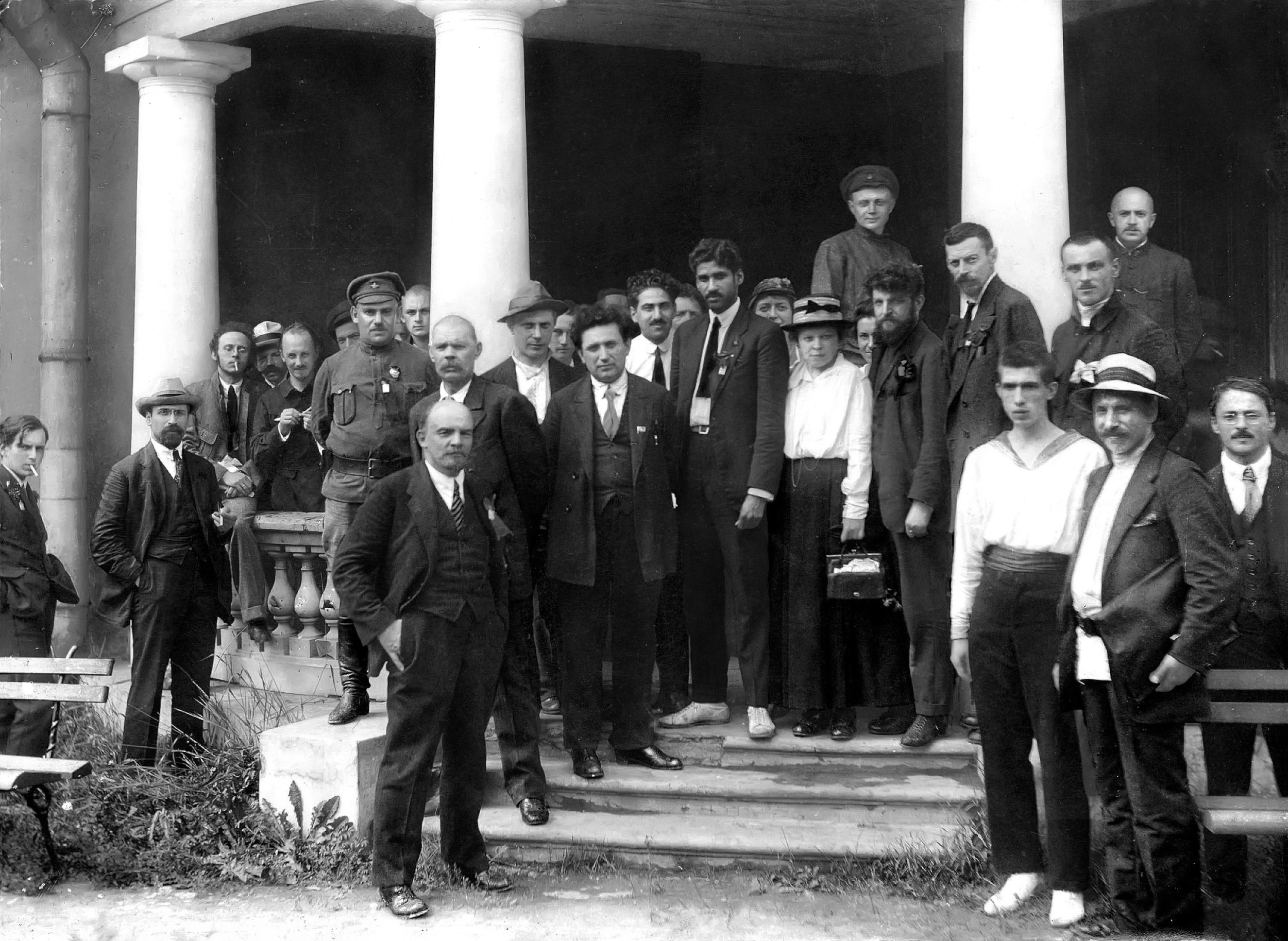
Delegates at the Second World Congress, 1920

The Second World Congress, held in Petrograd and Moscow from 19 July to 7 August 1920, is considered the true founding congress of the Comintern. Many delegates undertook hazardous, illegal journeys through the Allied blockade and civil war to attend, with some travelling for weeks to reach Russia. The congress itself took place amidst the privations of war communism, but the Bolsheviks staged impressive cultural spectacles, such as a mass performance depicting the history of class struggle, to foster revolutionary enthusiasm among the delegates and the domestic population.

The congress adopted the famous "Twenty-one Conditions" for admission, drafted primarily by Zinoviev under Lenin's guidance. These conditions, a "much more stringent and deterrent set" than the initial platform, aimed to split the rank-and-file of European socialist parties from their "opportunist" leaders and enforce Bolshevik organizational principles. Key conditions included: systematic removal of reformists and centrists from all responsible posts; combining legal and illegal activity; a complete break with figures like Kautsky and Ramsay MacDonald; establishing communist cells in trade unions; adherence to democratic centralism based on iron discipline and periodic purges; unconditional support for every Soviet republic; and changing party names to "Communist Party". Point sixteen stated that all decisions of Comintern congresses and the ECCI were binding on all parties. The congress also ratified the Statutes of the Comintern, which established the annual world congress as the supreme body and the ECCI as the directing body between congresses. Point 8 of the Statutes stipulated that the work of the ECCI was performed mainly by the party of the country where it was located (Soviet Russia), which had five representatives with full voting rights, while other major parties had only one.

This "universalisation of Bolshevism" was further elaborated in Lenin's pamphlet "Left-Wing" Communism: An Infantile Disorder (April 1920), which argued that "certain fundamental features of our revolution have a significance that is not local... but international". The Third (June–July 1921) and Fourth (November–December 1922) Congresses reinforced the centralist Bolshevik model, creating ECCI bodies like the Presidium, Secretariat, Organisational Bureau (Orgburo), and International Control Commission (ICC) that paralleled Russian party structures. The Comintern also began dispatching "agents" and "emissaries" to intervene in the affairs of national parties. Funding for foreign communist parties and the Comintern's clandestine activities, managed by the International Liaison Department (OMS) from 1921, came from the Soviet state treasury, creating economic dependence.

Despite the trend towards Russian dominance and centralisation, the Comintern in Lenin's era displayed a degree of pluralism and open debate not seen later. Figures like Paul Levi of the KPD and the Italian Amadeo Bordiga were not docile, and some national parties resisted or reinterpreted Moscow's directives.

=== "United workers' front" ===
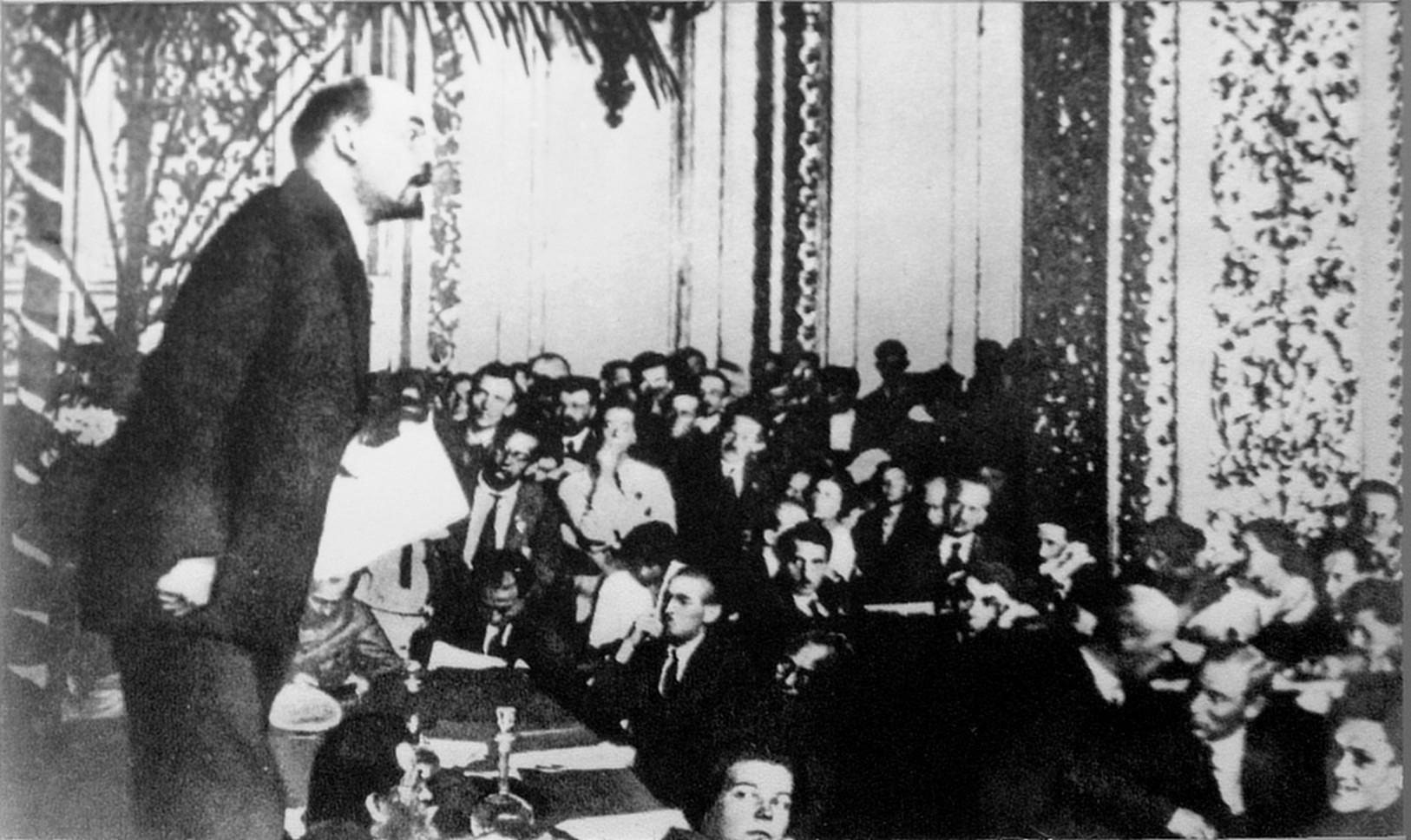
Vladimir Lenin addressing the Third World Congress, 1921

By late 1920 and into 1921, with the failure of revolutionary upheavals in Europe (such as the factory occupations in Italy and the "March Action" in Germany in 1921), Lenin reluctantly concluded that proletarian revolution was no longer on the immediate agenda. This led to the adoption of the "united workers' front" policy, formally expounded in ECCI theses on 18 December 1921. The policy aimed to win over the majority of the working class by engaging in joint defensive struggles with socialist rank-and-file against the capitalist offensive. It allowed for temporary alliances with reformist leaders ("united front from above") but primarily focused on unity "from below". The slogan of the Third Congress (1921) was "To the masses!".

The United Front policy was closely intertwined with changes in Soviet domestic and foreign policy, particularly the New Economic Policy (NEP) and the search for trade relations with capitalist nations. The Rapallo Treaty of April 1922 between Germany and Soviet Russia epitomized the growing tension between the Comintern's revolutionary goals and Soviet state interests. The United Front tactics faced intense opposition from left-wing elements in many communist parties (e.g., in France and Italy), who found it inconceivable to court the "social chauvinists". The Comintern's trade union arm, the Profintern (Red International of Labour Unions), founded on Lenin's initiative at the Second Congress in 1920, played a crucial role in applying United Front tactics in the industrial field, though this often led to splits in national trade union movements, as in Czechoslovakia and France.

A conference of the three Internationals (Second, Comintern, and the Vienna Union or "Two-and-a-half International") in Berlin in April 1922, aimed at creating common action, failed amidst mutual suspicion and recriminations. The Communists, led by Karl Radek, denounced the "social patriots", who in turn condemned the persecution of Socialist Revolutionaries and Mensheviks in Russia and the Soviet invasion of the Social Democratic republic of Georgia. Despite the hostility, a temporary Committee of Nine (three from each International) was formed to explore further steps towards unity, but it met only once in May 1922 and achieved nothing, with the Comintern soon withdrawing.

The "German October" of 1923, a failed Comintern-inspired uprising in Germany, revealed fundamental limitations in Comintern thinking, including inadequate military preparations and a misjudgment of the German workers' mood. This debacle convinced many Bolsheviks, notably Joseph Stalin, that European revolution was a distant prospect, reinforcing the priority of defending the Soviet state.

== Bolshevisation and Stalin's rise (1924–1928) ==
The period from 1924 to 1928 was characterized by the "Bolshevisation" of the Comintern and its member sections. This entailed an increasing Russian dominance, the Russification of ideological and organizational structures, and the canonization of Leninist principles of party unity, discipline, and democratic centralism, particularly the concentration of power in the hands of the Russian party delegation to the ECCI.

=== Impact of Soviet inner-party struggles ===
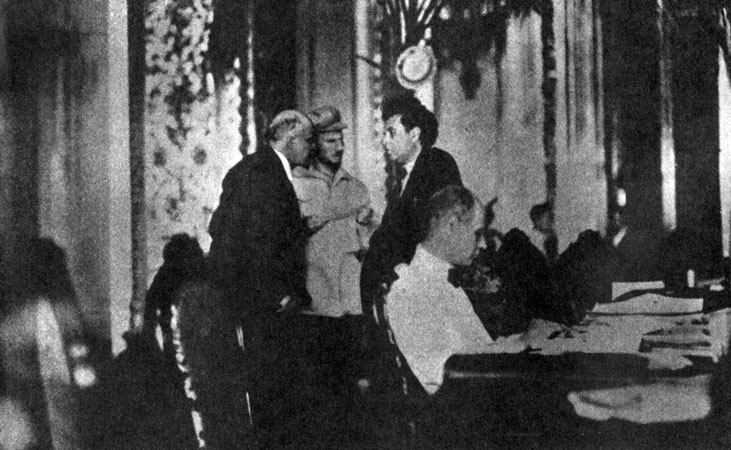
Lenin, Nikolai Bukharin, and Grigory Zinoviev at the Second World Congress

The failure of the "German October" and Lenin's death in January 1924 intensified inner-party struggles in the Soviet Union, which profoundly affected the Comintern. The triumvirate of Zinoviev, Lev Kamenev, and Stalin moved against Trotsky and his supporters. At an ECCI Presidium session in January 1924, Zinoviev attributed the German failure to the "opportunism" of Radek, Heinrich Brandler, and August Thalheimer, implicating Trotsky by association. "Trotskyism" was branded a "right deviation".

The slogan of "Bolshevisation" was officially proclaimed at the Fifth Comintern Congress (June–July 1924). In practice, it meant creating centralized, disciplined Leninist organizations fiercely loyal to the RCP majority in its struggle against the "Trotskyite opposition". Zinoviev declared the need for "iron discipline" and the eradication of "social-democratism, federalism, 'autonomy'". This led to a series of denunciations and expulsions: Brandler and Thalheimer were removed from the KPD leadership, replaced by leftists Arkadi Maslow and Ruth Fischer; Boris Souvarine was expelled from the French party; and Polish leaders like Adolf Warski were condemned.

The Fifth Congress also marked a tactical shift to the left regarding the United Front. The Theses on Tactics rejected united fronts "solely from above" and re-emphasized the united front "from below" under communist party leadership as a means to unmask reformist "bosses". Radek was removed from the ECCI, and Trotsky was demoted to non-voting status, replaced by Stalin.

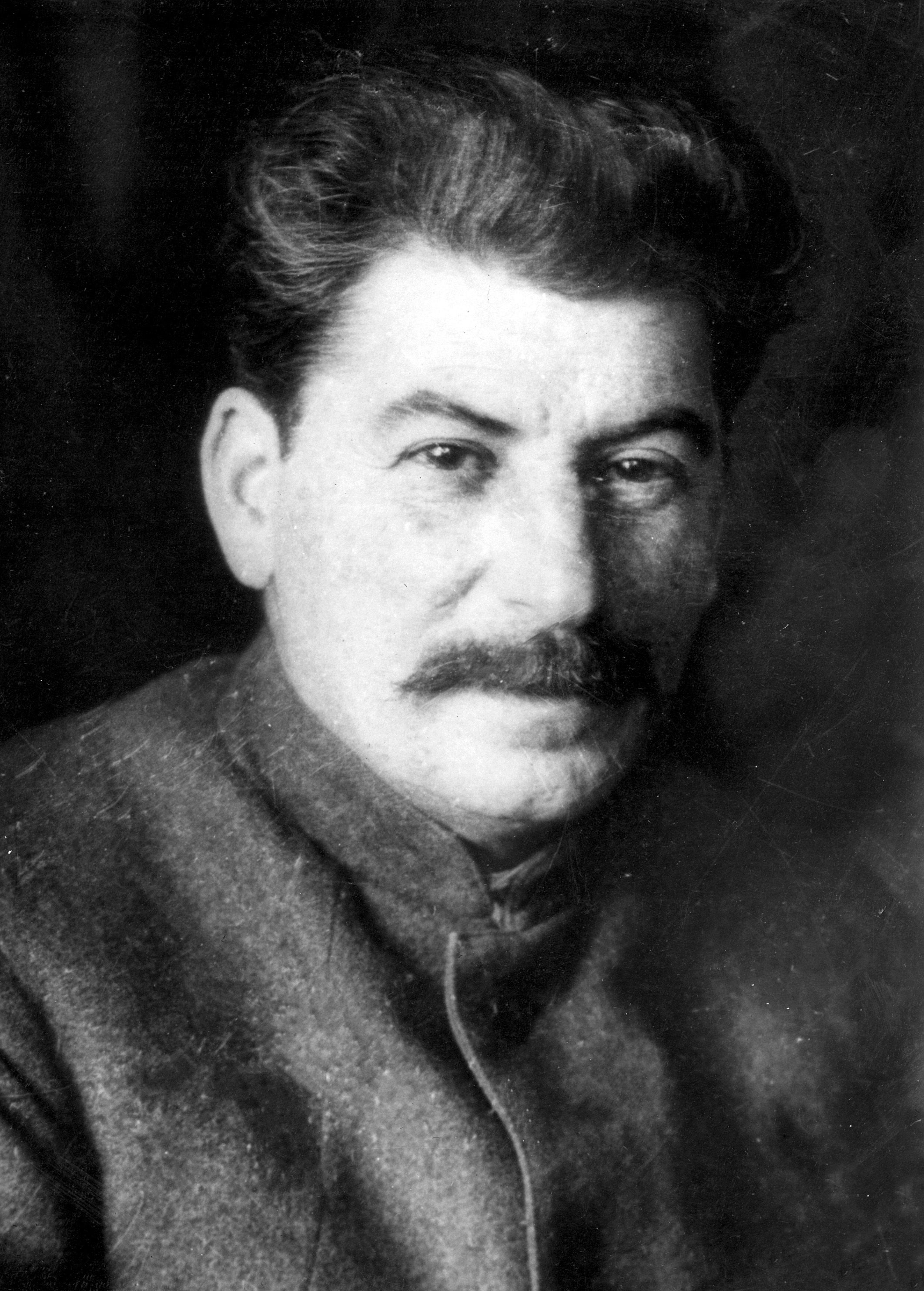
Joseph Stalin in the 1920s

However, the period 1925–1926 saw a tentative move back to the centre under Nikolai Bukharin's growing influence in the Comintern, emphasizing a broader conception of the United Front. It has been suggested that the failures of the Comintern to export proletarian revolution across the globe prompted Stalin to resort to the doctrine of "socialism in one country", first propounded in December 1924. This theory argued that the Soviet Union could build socialism without the need for immediate world revolution, and that the main task of communist parties was to defend the USSR. This fundamentally altered the strategic orientation of the international communist movement, subordinating the goal of world revolution to the defence and construction of the USSR, which was now considered the essential factor in that revolution. In order to sustain this "essential factor" its rapid industrialization was imperative but could not be achieved without normalizing diplomatic and economic relations with the developed capitalist countries, which in turn demanded taming the Comintern so that the attempts at exporting proletarian revolutions into them cease. A key initiative of this period was the Anglo-Russian Trade Union Committee, formed in April 1925, which aimed to foster trade union unity but ended in failure after the 1926 British General Strike.

By 1926, Zinoviev and Trotsky formed the United Opposition against the Stalin-Bukharin duumvirate, criticizing "socialism in one country" and the Comintern's rightward turn. The ensuing power struggle dominated the Comintern, leading to Zinoviev's removal as Comintern President in October 1926 (replaced by a "collective leadership" headed by Bukharin) and Trotsky's expulsion from the ECCI and eventually the Soviet Union.

=== National party responses ===
Foreign communist parties responded to Bolshevisation in various ways. Many leaders and members, out of sincere respect for the Bolsheviks' revolutionary success or a sense of disorientation, accepted Moscow's directives, sometimes lapsing into deference. Loyalty to the USSR as the first "socialist bastion" and a commitment to "internationalism" as defined by Moscow were powerful motivating factors. Figures like Palmiro Togliatti of the Italian party ultimately aligned with the RCP majority, recognizing the operational necessity of Moscow's support.

Bureaucratisation within the Comintern and national parties also facilitated Russian control. As world congresses became less frequent, power devolved to the ECCI and its Presidium, which were disproportionately staffed by Bolsheviks and managed the day-to-day workings of the International. However, there was also resistance. "Ultra-left" elements in parties like the KPD challenged the Russification of the Comintern and the perceived subordination of revolutionary goals to Soviet state interests. There was also widespread reluctance to implement specific organizational prescriptions of Bolshevisation, such as the replacement of territorial branches with factory cells and the formation of communist fractions in reformist trade unions. These measures often clashed with local traditions and practical difficulties, leading to slow implementation or outright disregard.

== Third Period (1928–1933) ==
The years 1928–1933 in Comintern history are known as the "Third Period", a phase of sectarian tactics which entailed increased opposition to the social democratic parties. This period was characterized by the belief that capitalism was entering its final crisis, leading to a new revolutionary upsurge and impending imperialist wars.

=== Defeat of the "right deviation" ===
The concept of a "Third Period" was first introduced by Bukharin at the Seventh ECCI Plenum (November–December 1926). He posited it as a phase following the initial post-war revolutionary upheaval (First Period) and the relative capitalist stabilization (Second Period), where the internal contradictions of stabilization would lead to a new revolutionary wave. This analysis remained Comintern orthodoxy through the Sixth World Congress (July–September 1928).

However, by 1928, the political landscape within the Soviet Union was shifting. Stalin began to move against Bukharin and his allies (the "Right Opposition"), who resisted his policies of rapid industrialization and forced collectivization. This struggle inevitably extended to the Comintern. The Sixth Congress, while formally still under Bukharin's influence, saw the Stalinist faction begin to construct a "right-wing deviation" within the Comintern, linking it to social democracy. Stalin's pivotal speech at an ECCI Presidium meeting in December 1928 concerning the KPD (the "German question") signalled a decisive move against any "Right faction" in the Comintern, demanding "iron inner-party discipline" and condemning "conciliators". This led to purges in various parties, such as in Germany, Sweden, and Czechoslovakia. Bukharin himself was removed from his Comintern duties in July 1929. Leading Comintern officials like Dmitri Manuilsky, Osip Piatnitsky, Otto Kuusinen, and Klement Gottwald aligned with Stalin.

=== Theory and practice of "social fascism" ===
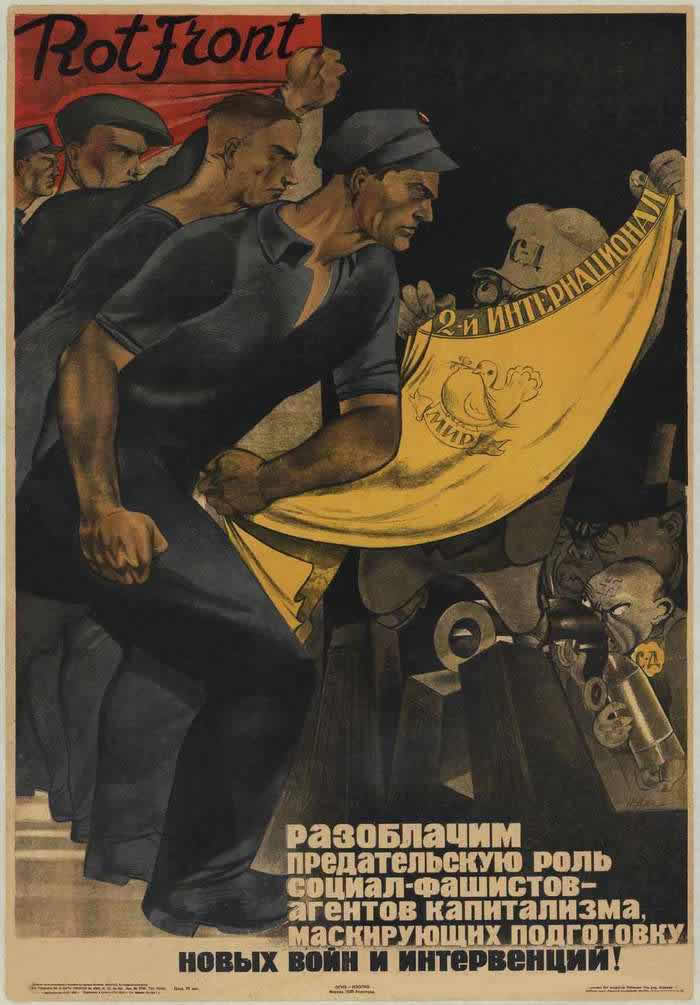
Soviet propaganda poster denouncing "social fascism", 1932

The central ideological tenet of the Third Period was the doctrine of "social fascism". This theory, formally expounded at the Tenth ECCI Plenum (July 1929), asserted that social democracy had transformed from a right-wing working-class party into a wing of the bourgeoisie, and in the context of capitalism's final crisis, had become the "moderate wing of fascism". "Left" social democrats (like the Austro-Marxists or the British Independent Labour Party) were branded as the most dangerous enemies, as they allegedly deceived the workers with revolutionary phrases while supporting capitalism.

This doctrine precluded any united front with social democratic leaders and mandated a strategy of "class against class", meaning communists should fight independently for the leadership of the working class. In practice, this led to intense hostility towards social democratic parties and trade unions. The Comintern urged the creation of independent "Red" trade unions or revolutionary oppositions within existing unions, aiming to organize the unorganized and unemployed, who were seen as a key revolutionary force. This policy proved largely counterproductive, isolating communists from the bulk of the organized working class and leading to a decline in membership and influence in many countries, such as Britain and Czechoslovakia.

In Germany, the "social fascism" line had particularly tragic consequences. The KPD, under Ernst Thälmann, directed its main fire against the Social Democratic Party of Germany (SPD), even engaging in joint actions with the Nazis against SPD-led governments (e.g., the Prussian referendum of 1931). The Twelfth ECCI Plenum in August 1932 was dominated by the German question and a sense of growing crisis, but its resolutions were confused and contradictory, reflecting deep divisions in Moscow over how to respond to the Nazi threat. While some leaders like Manuilsky and Kuusinen urged a more flexible united front, hard-liners like Vilhelm Knorin insisted on the primacy of the struggle against the SPD, and no clear line emerged. This division in the German labour movement fatally weakened its ability to resist the rise of Adolf Hitler. Historian G. D. H. Cole described the policy as "disastrous" and argued it was "largely responsible for Hitler's victory in Germany".

While some local-level collaboration between communists and social democrats occurred, the official Comintern line remained largely unchanged even after Hitler's accession to power in January 1933. The Thirteenth ECCI Plenum in December 1933, held in the aftermath of the German catastrophe, failed to reassess the policy, instead blaming the SPD for the Nazi victory and reasserting the "social fascism" line. In response to the SPD executive-in-exile's "Prague Manifesto" of January 1934, which called for revolutionary unity against Nazism, the Comintern maintained its "implacable hostility" and, in an appeal in May, denounced Social Democracy as the "ally of Fascism". The policy was also influenced by Soviet foreign policy concerns, particularly Stalin's initial fear of an Anglo-French war of intervention and the need to combat social democratic support for such a war, as well as the desire to maintain stable relations with Weimar Germany and prevent its alignment with Western powers against the USSR.

== Popular Front and Great Purge (1934–1939) ==
The disastrous consequences of the Third Period, epitomized by the Nazi seizure of power in Germany, led to a gradual and complex reorientation of Comintern policy towards the Popular Front. This era was simultaneously marked by the devastating impact of the Stalinist Great Purge on the Comintern itself.

=== Origins of the Popular Front ===
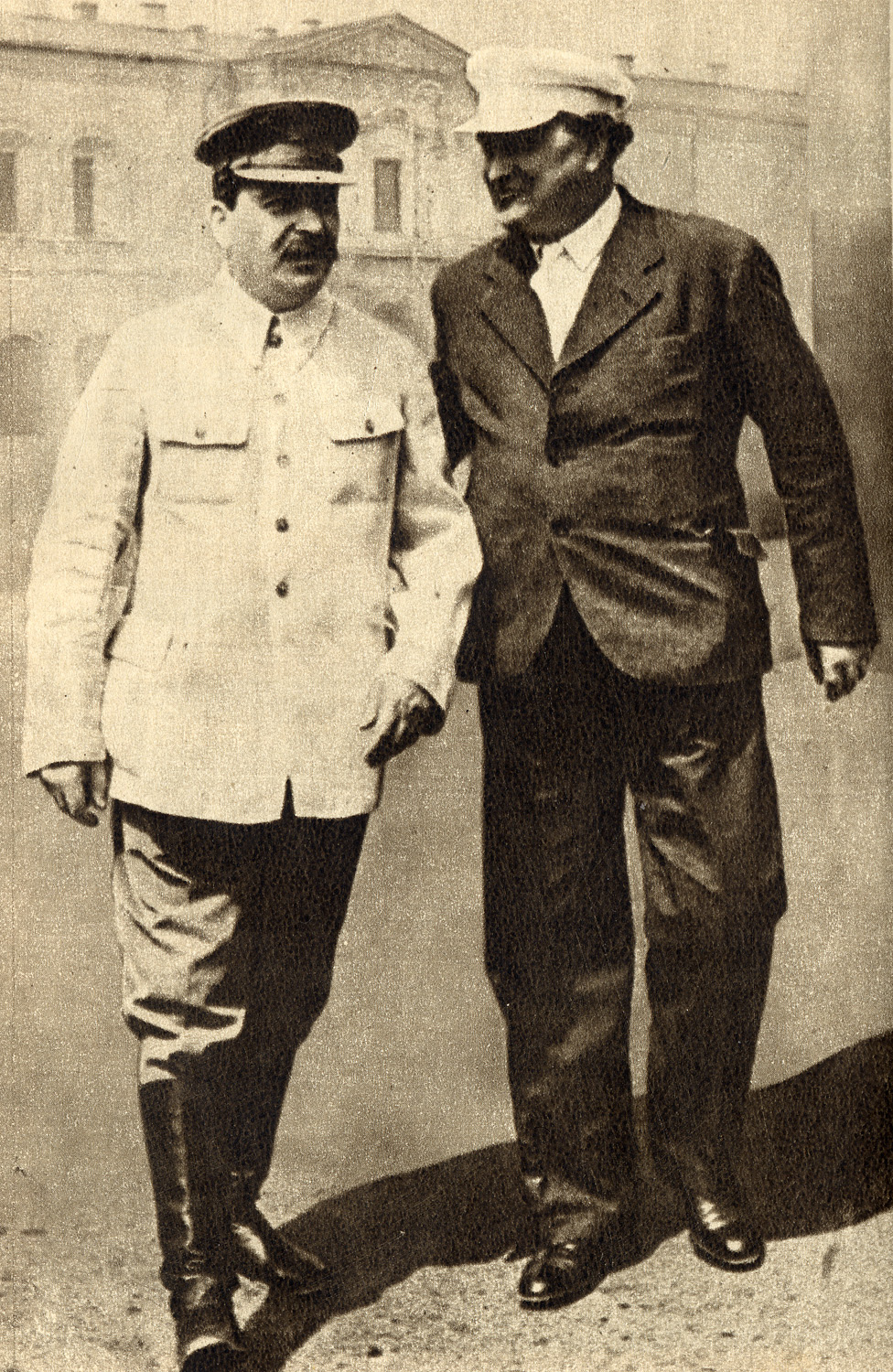
Stalin and Georgi Dimitrov in Moscow, 1936

The catalyst for the shift away from "social fascism" came largely from events in France. In February 1934, joint actions by socialist and communist workers against a common fascist threat created a powerful groundswell for unity from below. This coincided with a growing recognition within parts of the Comintern leadership, notably Georgi Dimitrov (who became General Secretary in spring 1934 after his Leipzig trial), that the old tactics had failed. By mid-May 1934, Dimitrov began to advocate for broader anti-fascist alliances, including with social democratic parties ("united front from above") and even middle-class "democratic" forces. The transition was marked by intense and protracted internal debates in Moscow throughout 1934 between proponents of the new line, like Dimitrov, Manuilsky, and Kuusinen, and "hard-line" opponents such as Knorin, Béla Kun, and Solomon Lozovsky, who resisted any deviation from the established dogma. Stalin's role was initially indecisive, but he ultimately gave his cautious approval to the new course. The enforcement of the line before Stalin was fully ready for a policy change led to the purging of leaders who dissented, such as Heinz Neumann and Hermann Remmele in Germany and Karl Kilbom in Sweden.

The process was driven by a "triple interaction": national factors (such as the anti-fascist unity in France), internal Comintern dynamics, and Soviet foreign policy (the USSR's search for collective security against Nazi Germany, leading to its entry into the League of Nations in September 1934, the efforts of Maxim Litvinov for "united resistance to Fascist aggression", and the Franco-Soviet Pact in May 1935). In July 1934, the French Communist Party (PCF) signed a "Pact of Unity of Action" with the French Socialists. The PCF, under Maurice Thorez, then pioneered the call for a broader Rassemblement Populaire in October 1934, extending appeals to the Radical Party.

=== Popular Front in practice ===
The Seventh World Congress of the Comintern (July–August 1935) formally ratified the Popular Front policy. Dimitrov's main report defined fascism as "the open terrorist dictatorship of the most reactionary, most chauvinistic and most imperialist elements of finance capital" and called for a "broad people's anti-fascist front" based on the proletarian united front but extending to the peasantry and urban petty-bourgeoisie. Communists were to defend bourgeois democratic liberties against fascism and present themselves as tribunes of national independence. The Congress resolution allowed for communist participation in Popular Front governments under certain pre-revolutionary conditions, viewing them as potential "transitional forms" to proletarian revolution.

However, the break with the past was partial. The universal applicability of the Bolshevik model was not challenged, and conditions for "organic unity" with socialists remained prohibitively strict. The Popular Front era was marked by an unresolved tension between inherited ideologies and new initiatives. While parties were given more leeway for local adaptation, Moscow's ultimate control remained, especially concerning foreign policy.

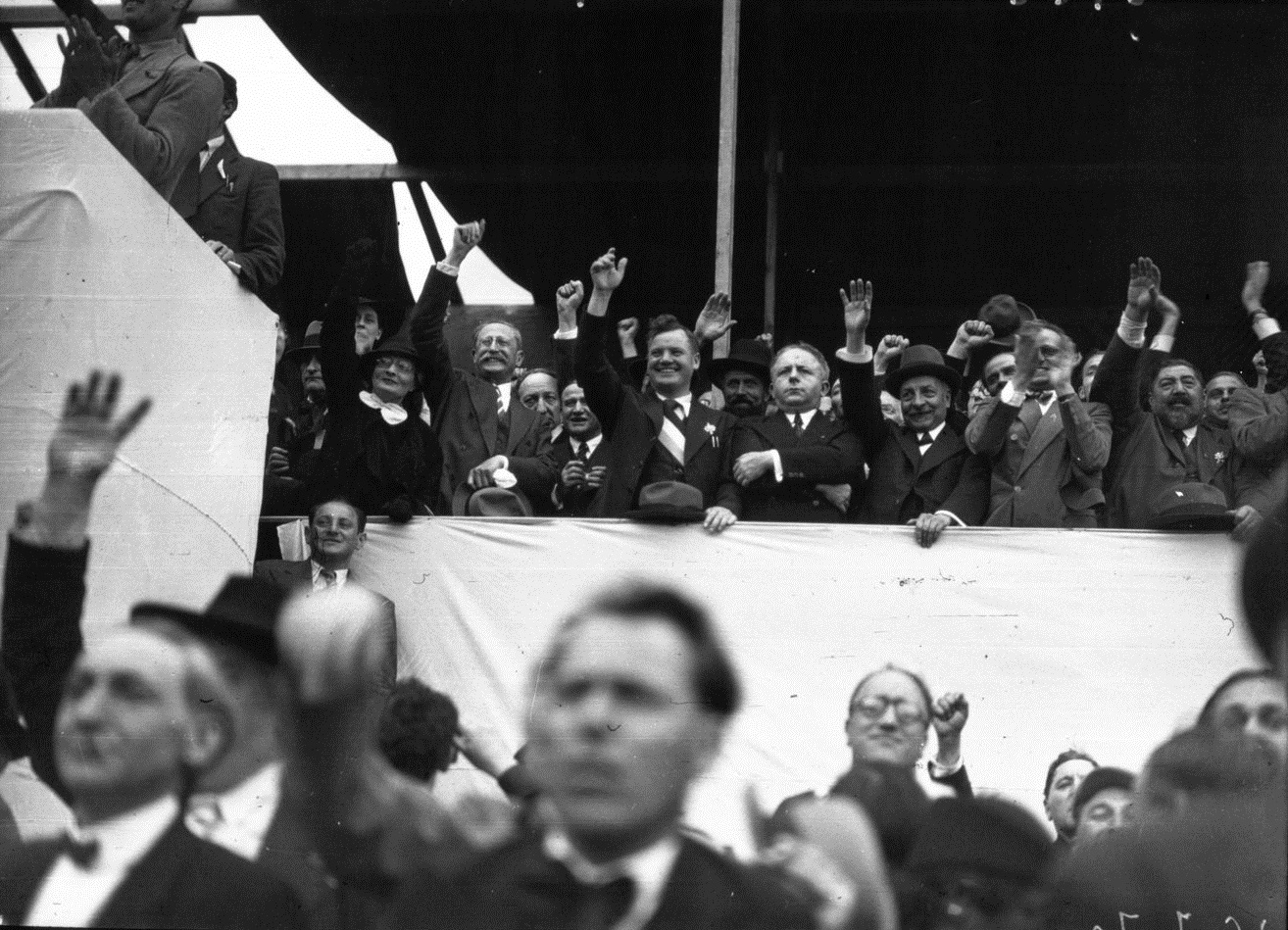
French Popular Front demonstration in 1936, including Léon Blum (SFIO), Maurice Thorez (PCF), and Pierre Cot (Radicals)

In France, the Popular Front led to an electoral victory in May 1936 and the formation of a government under Léon Blum, which the PCF supported from outside. This period saw massive growth in PCF membership and trade union influence, but was also characterized by a massive wave of strikes and factory occupations in June 1936 that alarmed the Radicals and complicated Soviet foreign policy aims of alliance with France. The PCF leadership, under Thorez, acted to end the strikes, arguing that it was necessary to know when to stop and that "The People's Front is not the revolution", a line driven by the need to preserve the Franco-Soviet pact.

=== Spanish Civil War ===
The Popular Front policy found its most prominent and fraught application in Spain. The Popular Front's narrow electoral victory in February 1936 brought a republican government to power, which the small Spanish Communist Party (PCE) supported. The victory was followed by a military coup led by Francisco Franco in July 1936, which plunged Spain into a civil war that was also a widespread social revolution. From the outset, the war became an international issue, with Nazi Germany and Fascist Italy providing crucial support to Franco's nationalists.

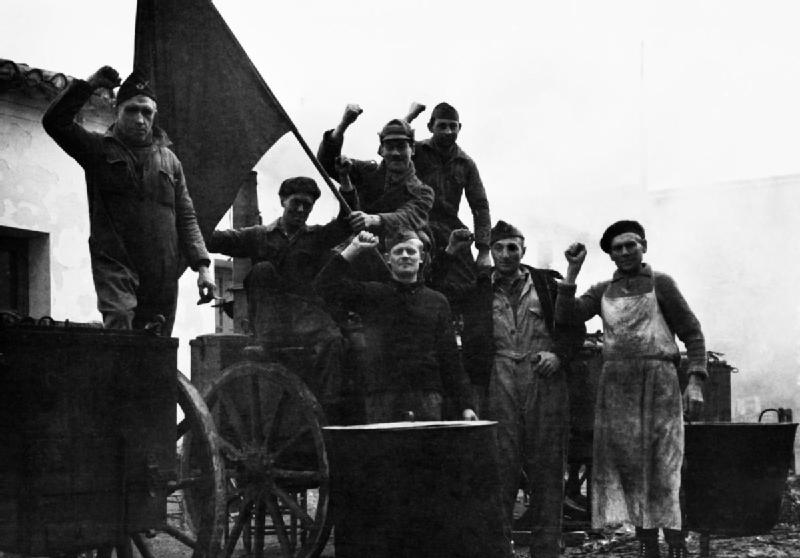
Members of the International Brigades during the Spanish Civil War, 1936–1937

The Comintern and the Soviet Union were initially hesitant to intervene directly, balancing support for the Republic with the diplomatic aim of not antagonizing Britain and France, whose policy of non-intervention the USSR initially joined. However, as nationalist successes mounted and Italo-German aid continued, Moscow shifted its policy. In September 1936, the Comintern began organizing the International Brigades for the defence of Madrid. The USSR also began to supply arms and military advisers, with Soviet tanks and aircraft playing a crucial role in saving Madrid in November 1936.

Soviet intervention was a "turning-point" in the war, but it also became the primary instrument for extending Comintern and Stalinist influence over the Republic's internal affairs. The PCE, hitherto a marginal force, grew enormously in numbers and prestige, its authority buttressed by the arrival of Soviet aid. The Comintern's strategy, directed from Moscow and implemented by figures like Palmiro Togliatti, was to subordinate all revolutionary objectives to the goal of military victory. This required building a broad "national front" and maintaining the appearance of a "democratic parliamentary republic" to avoid alienating the Western democracies, effectively "pushing the proletarian revolution back within the bourgeois-democratic bounds". This made the communists, in the view of G. D. H. Cole, "definitely a right-wing influence in Spanish affairs". This put the PCE in direct conflict with the powerful anarchist CNT and the revolutionary Marxist POUM, and allied it with the socialist centre and right wing under Indalecio Prieto.

Under Comintern guidance, the PCE and its Soviet advisers, including NKVD representative Alexander Orlov, established their own secret police and systematically persecuted their rivals on the Left. Tensions culminated in the Barcelona May Days of 1937, an armed conflict between government forces (backed by the communists) and anarchists. The defeat of the anarchists led to the fall of the socialist Prime Minister Francisco Largo Caballero, who had resisted communist pressure, and his replacement by the more compliant Juan Negrín. The POUM was subsequently outlawed, and its leader, Andreu Nin, was tortured and murdered by Soviet agents. The Comintern's policy in Spain thus became a microcosm of Stalinism, prioritizing the elimination of "Trotskyist" and other revolutionary opponents over a genuine united front against Franco. According to historian Fernando Claudin, the entire episode was the "sacrifice of a revolution to the interests of Soviet raison d'état". The internal divisions fatally weakened the Republican war effort, which ultimately collapsed in March 1939.

=== Comintern and the Great Purge ===
The Popular Front era coincided with the Great Purge in the USSR (1936–1938), which had a devastating impact on the Comintern. Foreign communists and political émigrés in Moscow were heavily targeted. The repression was driven by Stalin's paranoia, xenophobia, and desire to eliminate all potential opposition, real or imagined. Leading Comintern figures like Piatnitsky, Kun, and Knorin were arrested and shot. Entire national sections, most notably the Communist Party of Poland (KPP), were accused of infiltration by enemy agents and dissolved by the Comintern in 1938. Thousands of foreign communists perished in the Gulag or were executed. Of the approximately 320 Comintern employees mentioned by name in a study by Brigitte Studer, nearly a third died violently, with 58 perishing in the Stalinist purges before 1945. Comintern officials like Dimitrov and Manuilsky were complicit in the purges, though Dimitrov also attempted to save some individuals. The Purge effectively paralyzed the Comintern apparatus and shattered any remaining illusions about its independence.

== The Comintern in Asia ==
The Comintern's influence in Asia was shaped by the context of colonialism, anti-colonial nationalist movements, and the predominance of rural economies. While initial interest focused on Japan, the only industrialized nation in the region, it was in China that the Comintern had its greatest impact.

=== "Colonial question" and early approaches ===
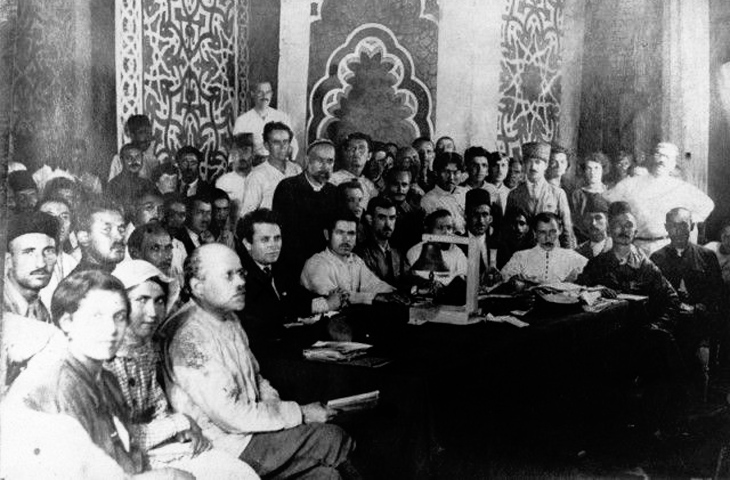
Turkestani delegation at the Congress of the Peoples of the East in Baku, 1920

The First Comintern Congress (1919) devoted little attention to the "colonial question". However, by the Second Congress (1920), as European revolution failed to materialize, the Bolsheviks began to see anti-imperialist struggles in the East as a way to stabilize the Soviet regime. Lenin's theses on the national and colonial questions, debated with the Indian communist M. N. Roy, allowed for temporary alliances between communists and "bourgeois-democratic" nationalist forces in colonial regions, provided the proletarian movement maintained its independence. The Baku Congress of the Peoples of the East (September 1920) and the Congress of Toilers of the Far East (January 1922) further formalized this commitment, though they also highlighted the complexities of applying Bolshevik models in agrarian societies lacking a strong industrial proletariat. In practice, however, Soviet state interests often led to the sacrifice of local communist movements in favour of alliances with nationalist leaders, such as Kemal Atatürk in Turkey, whose government suppressed and murdered the leadership of the Turkish Communist Party in 1921 while receiving Soviet aid.

=== China and the First United Front ===
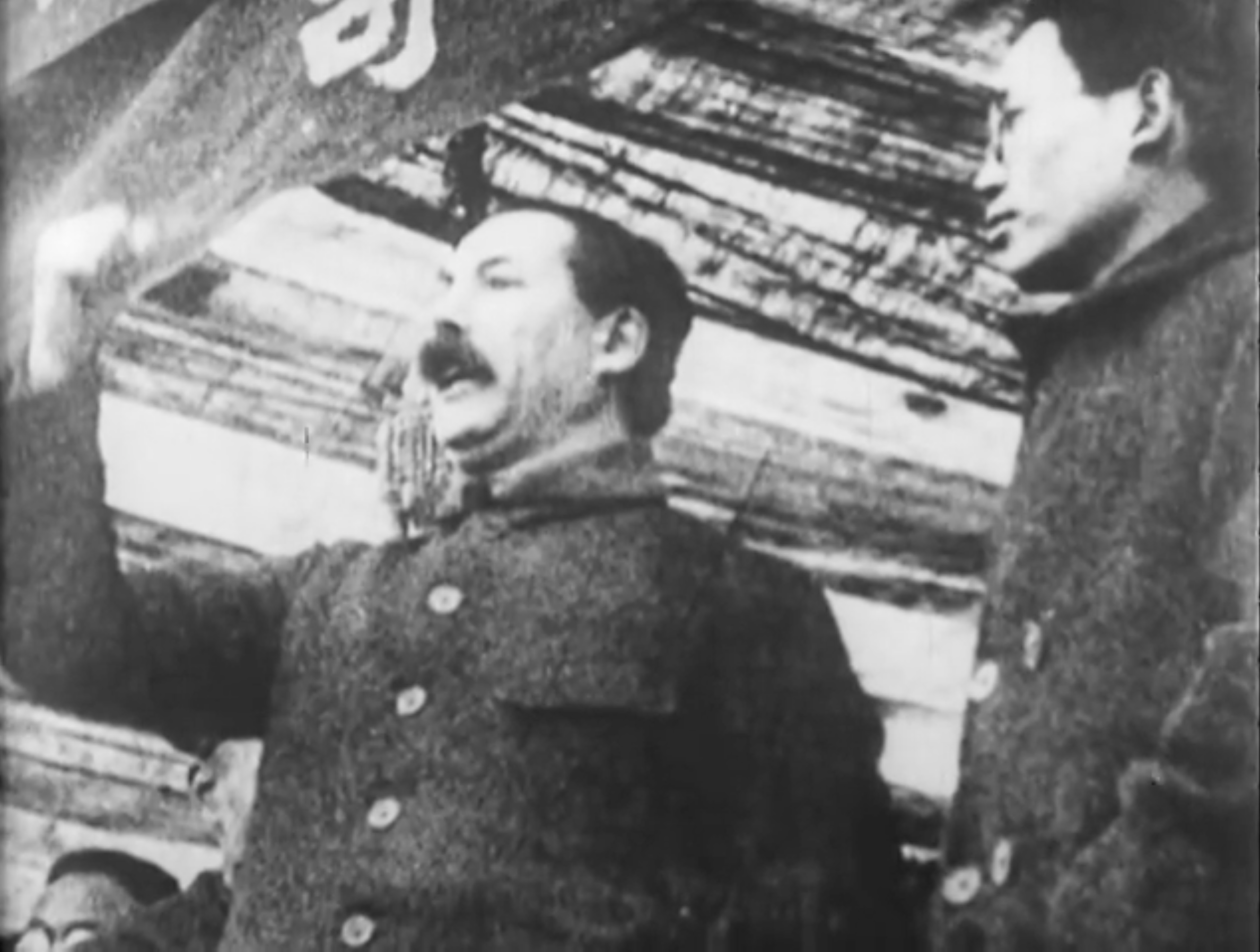
Mikhail Borodin delivering a speech in Wuhan, 1927

In China, the Comintern engaged with both the nationalist Kuomintang (KMT) and the fledgling Chinese Communist Party (CCP), founded in 1921. Under Comintern guidance, the KMT was reorganized along Soviet lines. In August 1922, the ECCI directed the CCP to enter the KMT as individuals, forming a "bloc within" – the First United Front. This policy, aimed at achieving national independence and unification under KMT leadership, was contested by CCP leaders like Chen Duxiu but ultimately enforced by Moscow, following direct negotiations between Soviet representatives and Sun Yat-sen. Comintern advisers like Mikhail Borodin played a significant role in both parties.

The United Front initially benefited the CCP, which grew rapidly, particularly after the May Thirtieth Movement of 1925. However, tensions mounted. After Sun Yat-sen's death in March 1925, Chiang Kai-shek consolidated power within the KMT. In March 1926, Chiang moved against the communists within the KMT, but the Comintern, under Stalin's direction, ignored this and continued to support the alliance and Chiang's Northern Expedition. In April 1927, Chiang launched a brutal massacre of communists in Shanghai, effectively ending the First United Front. The Comintern, seeking to preserve Stalin's infallibility, blamed CCP "rightists" and "leftists" for the disaster. Chen Duxiu was removed as General Secretary.

=== "28 Bolsheviks" and rural soviets ===
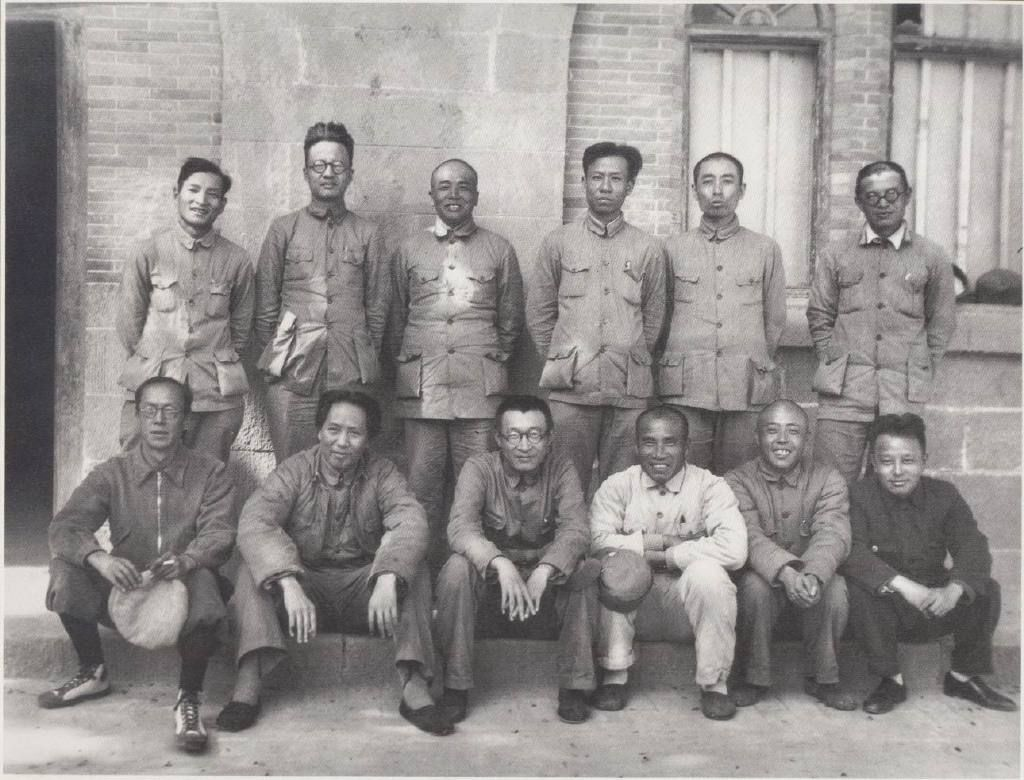
CCP leadership in 1938, including members of the 28 Bolsheviks such as Wang Ming (front row, rightmost) and Bo Gu (back row, second from left), as well as Mao Zedong (front row, second from left)

The Sixth CCP Congress, held in Moscow in 1928 under Comintern supervision, confirmed Stalin's doctrinal "correctness" and initiated a deeper Bolshevisation of the CCP. The Congress acknowledged the failure of the United Front but asserted that a new revolutionary wave was coming and that the CCP must prepare for it. Its resolutions attempted to steer a course between the "right-wing deviations" of Chen Duxiu and "left-wing 'putsch-ism'". The new policy emphasized the need for a revolution against both the landlords and the bourgeoisie, and recognized the importance of the peasant movement and guerrilla warfare. However, it dogmatically insisted that the urban proletariat must lead the revolution, despite the CCP's growing rural base under figures like Mao Zedong. This period saw the rise of Moscow-trained Chinese cadres, the "28 Bolsheviks" like Wang Ming, who ensured CCP subordination to Comintern directives. Li Lisan's attempts to implement Comintern directives to seize major urban centers in 1930 ended in failure, for which he was made a scapegoat.

Wang Ming became CCP General Secretary in 1931, marking the zenith of direct Comintern intervention. Following the Japanese invasion of Manchuria in September 1931, Comintern policy became increasingly confused, caught between the imperative to fight Japanese imperialism (which threatened Soviet interests) and the established dogma of opposing the Kuomintang as the primary enemy. A Comintern directive in December 1931 called for a "national revolutionary war" but simultaneously pronounced that overthrowing the Kuomintang was its "pre-requisite". The CCP leadership, particularly those in the Jiangxi Soviet like Mao, maintained a degree of autonomy, partly due to irregular communications with Moscow and Shanghai. The Long March (1934–1935), forced by KMT encirclement campaigns, saw Mao rise to pre-eminence at the Zunyi Conference (January 1935), challenging the Moscow-backed leadership. The Comintern's adoption of the Popular Front policy at its Seventh Congress (1935) and the growing threat of Japanese expansion led to the formation of a Second United Front between the CCP and KMT in 1937, following the Xi'an Incident. By this time, however, direct Comintern influence over CCP policy had significantly diminished.

=== India ===
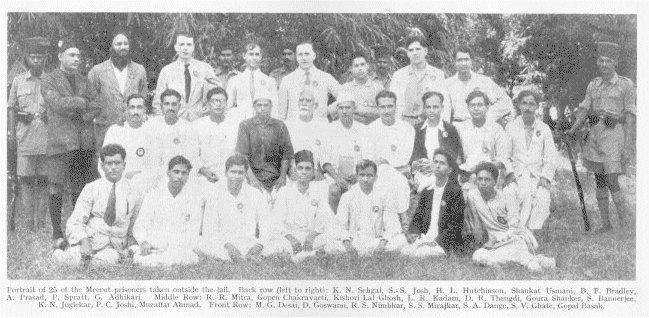
Accused trade union leaders in the Meerut Conspiracy Case (1929–1933)

The Comintern identified British-ruled India as a key target for its anti-colonial strategy, viewing it as the "citadel of the revolution in the East". In 1920, it founded the Central Asian Bureau in Tashkent to train Indian communists, with M. N. Roy as a central figure. At the Second Congress, Roy ran counter to Lenin's theses, arguing that a proletarian class struggle had already developed in India and that the new Communist party should lead the independence movement in struggle against, not in alliance with, the nationalist middle class. An abortive attempt was made to prepare an armed expedition to India from Tashkent. Early attempts to establish a party were hampered by British repression, culminating in the Meerut Conspiracy Case (1929–1933), in which thirty-one communist and trade union leaders were tried for a "revolutionary conspiracy to overthrow the existing order". The court found that the Communist Party of India (CPI)'s aim was "to incite to violent revolution".

Throughout the late 1920s and early 1930s, the Comintern adhered to the "social fascism" line, condemning the Indian National Congress as a "class organization of capitalists" and denouncing its left-wing leaders, Jawaharlal Nehru and Subhas Chandra Bose, as a "dangerous hindrance to India's revolution". After the Seventh Congress in 1935, this policy was reversed. The Comintern now instructed the CPI to form a united front with the Congress Socialist Party (CSP) and to enter the Indian National Congress itself, which was now described as a "major anti-imperialist people's organization". The CPI's use of "conspiratorial techniques" to infiltrate and take over key positions within the CSP and its allied trade unions led to the collapse of the united front in 1940, when the socialists expelled the communists.

=== Japan ===
The Comintern saw Japan as a "revolutionary key position in the Far East" due to its industrialisation. The Japanese Communist Party (JCP) was founded in 1922 as a direct creation of the Comintern, following a decision at the Congress of the Toilers of the Far East in Moscow. From its inception, the party was illegal, composed largely of intellectuals, and subject to intense police persecution. In June 1923, nearly all its leaders were arrested, and the party was dissolved by its own leadership in March 1924, a decision which met with "angry resistance from Moscow". Under instructions from the Comintern's Shanghai Bureau, the party was reconstituted in late 1926. A wave of arrests in March 1928, however, again crippled the party, and it was effectively destroyed by further mass arrests in 1929 and 1932. By 1935, Japanese communism existed only as "a concealed thought in the memories of a few 'true believers', most of whom were in prison".

== The Comintern in Latin America ==
Although Delegates from Latin America appeared as early as the Second Congress of the Comintern, Latin America was not 'discovered' by the Comintern until 1923, after the Fourth Congress. Because of the centralized nature of the Comintern, the Latin American affiliates were impacted as much as any other by Bolshevization, the Third Period, and the Popular Front. Latin america also served as one of many battlegrounds between 'lefts' and 'rights'.

Although communist parties in Latin America appeared as early as 1918, with the founding of the Communist Party of Argentina, It would not be until the late 1920s when communism had an established presence in most countries.

There were no Latin American delegates present at the Congress of the Peoples of the East, which decided Comintern colonial policy, nor was Latin America mentioned in its proclamations. The American bureau of the Comintern in Mexico City was established by Mikhail Borodin in July 1920. Mexico was chosen to be the base of the Comintern in Latin America due to the presence of many communist exiles, as well as its proximity to the United States, which was a larger focus than Latin America. However, decision making was not made in Mexico or by Latin Americans, as the affairs of Latin America were instead discussed in the Latin secretariat, which included France, Italy, and Spain.Only after the fifth congress in 1924 was a fully South American secretariat created.

While communism continued to grow in Latin America, especially after the creation of the south American secretariat, Communist parties were still rather marginal, especially in the eyes of the Comintern.

== World War II and dissolution (1939–1943) ==
The period from August 1939 to June 1943 is widely regarded as marking the apogee of the Comintern's subordination to Stalin's foreign policy.

=== Nazi–Soviet Pact and "imperialist war" ===
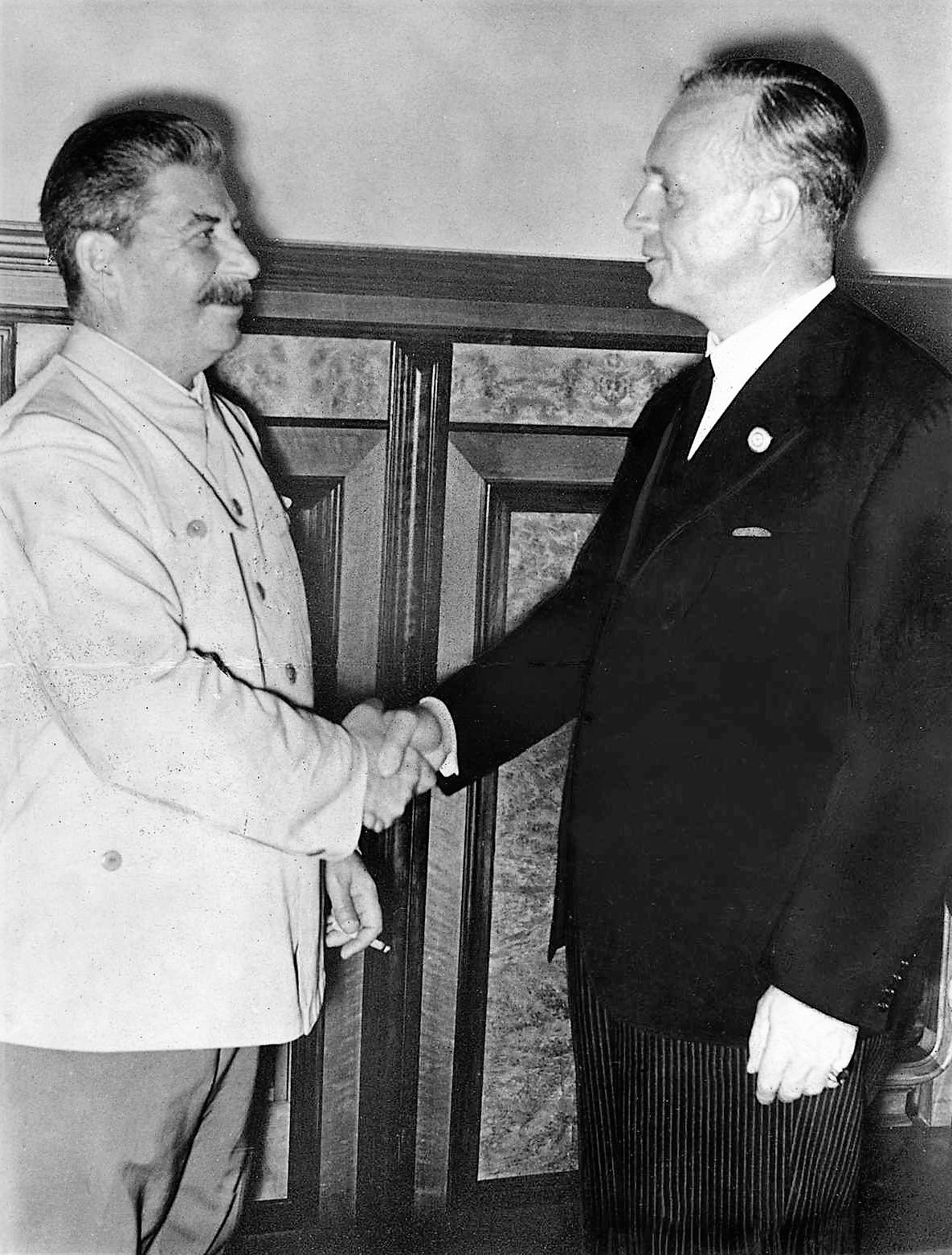
Stalin and German foreign minister Joachim von Ribbentrop shaking hands after the signing of the Nazi–Soviet Pact, 1939

The signing of the Nazi–Soviet Pact in August 1939 led to a dramatic "about turn" in Comintern policy. G. D. H. Cole characterized it as a "gross betrayal of the anti-fascist faith", though he also argued it was "not without excuse in face of the attitude of the Western 'appeasers'". On 7 September 1939, following the German invasion of Poland and a personal interview with Stalin, Dimitrov received instructions to characterize the unfolding war as an "imperialist" conflict between two groups of capitalist states, for which the bourgeoisie of all belligerent states bore equal responsibility. ECCI Secretariat theses issued on 9 September directed communist parties in belligerent states to actively oppose the "unjust war" and expose its imperialist nature. The division between "fascist" and "democratic" capitalist countries was declared to have lost its former sense, and the Popular Front slogan was to be renounced. During this period, the Comintern attacked social democrats as "agents in the service of British imperialism". This marked a fundamental revision of the anti-fascist strategy pursued since 1934, and communist parties were required to drop the banner of anti-fascism at the very moment Hitler's armies began the conquest of Europe.

The new line caused confusion and dissent in many communist parties. The Communist Party of Great Britain (CPGB), for instance, initially supported the war against Nazi Germany but was forced to reverse its position after intervention from Moscow, leading to the replacement of Harry Pollitt as General Secretary by R. Palme Dutt. The PCF was outlawed, and its leaders fled into exile or were arrested. For many communists, particularly those in the prisons and concentration camps of fascist Europe, the pact was a devastating moral and political blow. Throughout 1940 and early 1941, the Comintern maintained the "imperialist war" characterization, though the rapid collapse of France in summer 1940 prompted some tentative rethinking regarding communist participation in anti-Nazi resistance in occupied territories.

=== "Great Patriotic War" and dissolution ===
The German invasion of the Soviet Union on 22 June 1941 (Operation Barbarossa) led to another abrupt volte-face. The war was now redefined as a "Great Patriotic War" for the defense of the USSR and an anti-fascist struggle. Communist parties were instructed to give unstinting support to the Allied governments and build broad national fronts and resistance movements.

The Comintern was officially dissolved on 15 May 1943, with the ECCI Presidium recommending its disbandment. It had, however, effectively ceased to function after the last meeting of its Bureau in April 1940. The stated reasons were that the centralized international organizational form had become a drag on the further strengthening of national working-class parties and that the diverse conditions in different countries required greater independence and maneuverability. Stalin, in a rare interview, added that the dissolution would expose the "lie of the Hitlerites" that Moscow intended to intervene in other nations and "Bolshevise" them, and would facilitate the work of patriots in uniting freedom-loving peoples against Hitlerism.

The dissolution is widely seen as a gesture by Stalin to appease his Western Allies (Britain and the United States), particularly to facilitate the opening of a second front in Europe, and was the final step in subordinating the goal of world revolution to the Soviet strategy of dividing the post-war world into "spheres of influence". It also reflected the reality that the Comintern had largely ceased to function effectively as a centralized directing body during the war due to disrupted communications. After 1943, an organizational framework continued in Moscow under Dimitrov, attached to the CPSU Central Committee as the International Department, and through "special institutes" (numbered 99, 100, and 205) that carried on tasks like training cadres, maintaining radio links, and gathering intelligence. This ensured continued Soviet influence over the international communist movement, which would re-emerge more formally with the creation of the Cominform in 1947.

== World Congresses and Plenums ==
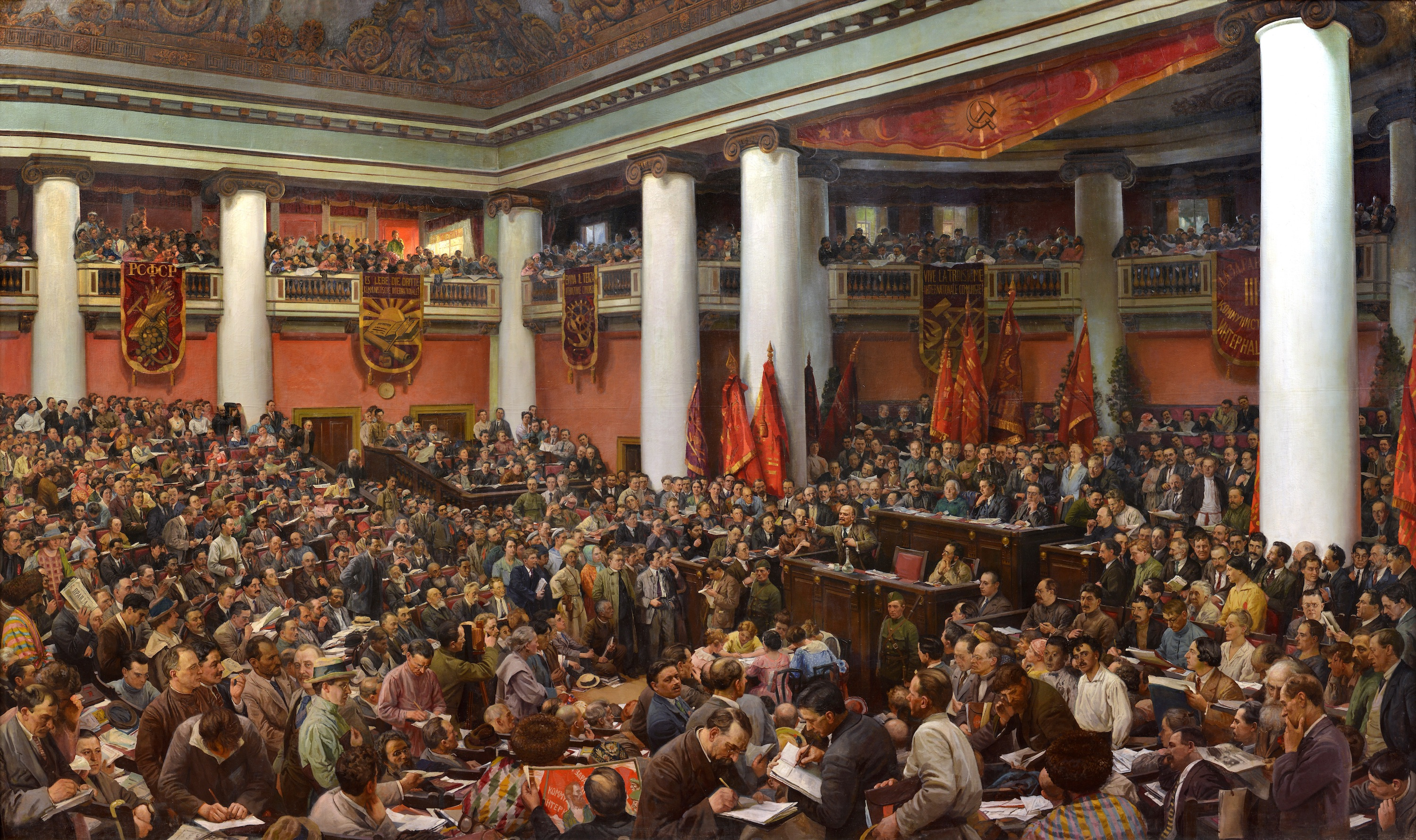
Painting depicting the Second World Congress in 1920, by Isaak Brodsky

The Comintern held seven World Congresses:

1. First (Founding) Congress: Moscow, 2–6 March 1919
2. Second World Congress: Petrograd and Moscow, 19 July – 7 August 1920
3. Third World Congress: Moscow, 22 June – 12 July 1921
4. Fourth World Congress: Petrograd and Moscow, 5 November – 5 December 1922
5. Fifth World Congress: Moscow, 17 June – 8 July 1924
6. Sixth World Congress: Moscow, 17 July – 1 September 1928
7. Seventh World Congress: Moscow, 25 July – 21 August 1935

The ECCI also convened thirteen Enlarged Plenums between 1922 and 1933, which served as important decision-making forums between congresses:

1. First Enlarged Plenum: Moscow, 24 February – 4 March 1922
2. Second Enlarged Plenum: Moscow, 7–11 June 1922
3. Third Enlarged Plenum: Moscow, 12–23 June 1923
4. Fourth Enlarged Plenum: Moscow, 12–13 July 1924
5. Fifth Enlarged Plenum: Moscow, 21 March – 6 April 1925
6. Sixth Enlarged Plenum: Moscow, 17 February – 15 March 1926
7. Seventh Enlarged Plenum: Moscow, 22 November – 16 December 1926
8. Eighth Enlarged Plenum: Moscow, 18–30 May 1927
9. Ninth Enlarged Plenum: Moscow, 9–25 February 1928
10. Tenth Enlarged Plenum: Moscow, 3–19 July 1929
11. Eleventh Enlarged Plenum: Moscow, 26 March – 11 April 1931
12. Twelfth Enlarged Plenum: Moscow, 27 August – 15 September 1932
13. Thirteenth Enlarged Plenum: Moscow, 28 November – 12 December 1933

== Organization ==
The Comintern was designed to be a centralized "world party". Its supreme body was the World Congress, which was supposed to meet annually (later less frequently) to decide on program and policy. Between congresses, the Comintern was directed by its Executive Committee (ECCI). The ECCI, in turn, elected a Presidium to handle day-to-day affairs, and a Secretariat. Other important bodies included the Organisational Bureau (Orgburo) and the International Control Commission (ICC), which was responsible for discipline and ideological purity. The International Liaison Department (Otdel mezhdunarodnoi sviazi, OMS), established in 1921, managed the Comintern's clandestine activities, including funding, communications, and forging documents. The ECCI and its subsidiary bodies were based in Moscow. The statutes stipulated that the Communist Party of the host country (the Soviet Union) would have a disproportionate influence, holding five seats on the ECCI, while other major parties held one. National communist parties were considered "sections" of the Comintern, bound by its decisions.

By the early 1930s, the parties' social composition had shifted significantly. Following the "Third Period" policy and the Great Depression, many parties were transformed from organizations of employed industrial workers into parties of the unemployed. In Germany, the percentage of factory workers in the KPD dropped from over 62% in 1928 to around 20% in 1931. The parties were also characterized by an extremely high membership turnover, or "fluctuation". The entire membership of most parties was almost completely renewed every few years, with only a small nucleus of about 5% remaining constant, preventing the formation of stable traditions and cadres independent of Moscow. Between 1921 and 1931, the total membership of the Comintern's non-Soviet parties declined from 887,000 to 328,000. For context, the rival Labour and Socialist International claimed an affiliated membership of over 6.2 million in 1928, with a total electoral vote of 25.6 million. The Comintern's finances, however, far exceeded those of its socialist rival; its income in 1927 was over twenty-six times greater, drawing on the resources of the Soviet state.

=== Member parties ===
Member parties of the Communist International
Country/Region	Organization name	Years of affiliation	Notes
Albania	Albanian Communist Party (PKSh)	1941–1943	Founded in 1941, succeeding an Albanian communist group founded in Moscow in 1928.
Algeria	Algerian Communist Party (PCA)	1920–1943	The Algerian Federation of the French Section of the Workers' International (SFIO) voted to join the Comintern in 1920, becoming a federation of the French Communist Party. It was transformed into the Communist Party of Algeria in 1935 and adopted the name Algerian Communist Party in 1936.
Argentina	Communist Party of Argentina (PCA)	1919–1943	Founded as the International Socialist Party in January 1918. Changed its name to Communist Party of Argentina in December 1918.
Armenia	Communist Party of Armenia (HKP)	1920–1943	Founded in 1920. Became a pseudo-autonomous part of the Russian Communist Party (Bolshevik) in 1922.
Australia	Communist Party of Australia (CPA)	1922–1943	Founded in 1920. Briefly known as the United Communist Party of Australia in 1922. It was the "Communist Party of Australia, Section of the Communist International" from 1922 to 1944.
Austria	Communist Party of Austria (KPÖ)	1919–1943	Founded in 1918 as the Communist Party of German Austria. Changed name in 1919. It went underground in 1933.
Azerbaijan	Azerbaijan Communist Party (AKP)	1920–1943	Founded in 1920. Became a regional organization of the All-Union Communist Party (Bolshevik).
Belgium	Communist Party of Belgium (PCB)	1921–1943	Founded in 1921. It operated illegally underground during the German occupation (1940–1945).
Belorussia	Communist Party of Belorussia (KPB)	1919–1943	Founded in 1918 as a part of the Russian Communist Party (Bolshevik).
Brazil	Brazilian Communist Party (PCB)	1922–1943	Founded in 1922.
Bulgaria	Bulgarian Communist Party (BKP)	1919–1943	The Bulgarian Social Democratic Workers' Party (Narrow Socialists) was founded in 1903. It was renamed the Bulgarian Communist Party in 1919. It was dissolved in 1924, reappeared as the legal Workers' Party in 1927, and was dissolved again in 1934, continuing illegally as the Bulgarian Workers' Party (Communist).
Burma	Communist Party of Burma (CPB)	1939–1943	Founded circa 1939.
Canada	Communist Party of Canada (CPC)	1921–1943	Founded as an illegal party in 1921. The legal Workers' Party of Canada acted as its public branch from 1922 to 1924. The party was legalized in 1924 but was forced underground by government repression from 1931 to 1934. It was banned in 1940 and revived as the Labor-Progressive Party in 1943.
Ceylon	Ceylon Communist Party (LKP)	1943	A Stalinist party founded in 1943. The earlier Ceylon Equality Party (founded 1935) was a Trotskyist organization and not a Comintern member.
Chile	Communist Party of Chile (PCCh)	1922–1943	The Socialist Workers' Party of Chile was founded in 1912 and changed its name to the Communist Party of Chile in 1922.
China	Chinese Communist Party (CCP)	1921–1943	Founded in 1921. It was never formally outlawed, but was persecuted by various warlords.
Colombia	Communist Party of Colombia (PCC)	1928–1943	The Socialist Revolutionary Party was founded in 1926 and joined the Comintern in 1928. It changed its name to the Communist Party of Colombia in 1930.
Costa Rica	Communist Party of Costa Rica (PCCR)	1935–1943	Founded in 1929. Changed its name to the Popular Vanguard Party in 1943.
Cuba	Communist Party of Cuba (PCC)	1925–1943	A Communist Group of Havana was founded in 1923, which adopted the name Communist Party of Cuba in 1925. Went underground in 1935. It was re-legalized in 1938 and changed its name to the Popular Socialist Party in 1944.
Cyprus	Communist Party of Cyprus (KKK)	1926–1941	Founded in 1926. Outlawed by British authorities in 1931 and disintegrated from 1935–36. It reappeared in 1941 as the Progressive Party of Working People but was not a Comintern member under this guise.
Czechoslovakia	Communist Party of Czechoslovakia (KSČ)	1921–1943	Founded in 1921 from several communist groups. Outlawed by the Czechoslovak government and later the German occupation authorities from 1938–45.
Denmark	Communist Party of Denmark (DKP)	1920–1943	Founded in 1920. Operated underground during the German occupation.
Dominican Republic	Dominican Communist Party (PCD)	1942–1943	Founded clandestinely in 1942, succeeding a communist group formed by Spanish Civil War refugees in 1939.
Ecuador	Communist Party of Ecuador (PCE)	1928–1943	A left faction of the Ecuadorian Socialist Party joined the Comintern in 1928. It established itself as the Communist Party of Ecuador in 1931 and operated clandestinely.
Egypt	Egyptian Communist Party (ECP)	1921–1925	Founded in 1921. It was suppressed by British authorities and disintegrated by 1925.
El Salvador	Communist Party of El Salvador (PCES)	1930–1943	Began in the mid-1920s as part of a proposed Communist Party of Central America; the Salvadoran party was formally founded in 1930.
Estonia	Communist Party of Estonia (EKP)	1920–1943	Founded in 1920 from an Estonian Section of the Russian Bolshevik party. Remained illegal until 1940 when it was incorporated as a section into the Communist Party of the Soviet Union.
Finland	Finnish Communist Party (SKP)	1919–1943	Founded in Moscow in 1918; it was illegal in Finland but active underground.
France	French Communist Party (PCF)	1921–1943	Founded in 1921. Outlawed by the French government, and later the German occupation authorities, from 1939 to 1944.
Georgia	Communist Party of Georgia (KPG)	1920–1943	A Bolshevik Party of Georgia was founded in 1920 when Georgia was independent. The Communist Party (Bolshevik) of Georgia was founded after the Soviet invasion in 1921.
Germany	Communist Party of Germany (KPD)	1919–1943	Founded in 1918. A split in 1919 produced the short-lived Communist Workers' Party of Germany (KAPD). A left-wing of the Independent Social Democratic Party of Germany (USPD) merged with the KPD in 1920 to form the United Communist Party of Germany. The KPD was outlawed from 1933–45.
Greece	Communist Party of Greece (KKE)	1920–1943	The Socialist Labour Party of Greece was founded in 1918. It voted to affiliate with the Comintern in 1920, and changed its name to the Communist Party of Greece in 1924. It went underground from 1936–44.
Honduras	Communist Party of Honduras (PCH)	1927–1932	Founded in 1927. Destroyed by government repressions in 1932.
Hungary	Communist Party of Hungary (KMP)	1919–1943	Founded in Moscow in March 1918. A separate party was founded in Hungary in November 1918, becoming the ruling party of the Hungarian Soviet Republic (March–August 1919). It went underground after the republic's collapse. It was dissolved by the Comintern in 1922, reorganized in 1925, and its leadership was moved to Prague in 1936.
Iceland	Communist Party of Iceland (KFI)	1930–1943	A small faction of the Social Democratic Party affiliated with the Comintern in 1921 but was ordered not to secede. The Communist Party of Iceland was founded in 1930. In 1938, it merged to form the People's Unity Party – Socialist Party.
India	Communist Party of India (CPI)	1928–1943	Founded in 1928. It was declared illegal and operated underground from 1934 to 1942.
Indochina	Indochinese Communist Party (ICP)	1930–1943	Founded in Hong Kong in 1930 by the merger of various communist groups, and active in Cambodia, Laos, and Vietnam. It established the Viet Minh in 1941, and was dissolved in 1945.
Indonesia	Communist Party of Indonesia (PKI)	1920–1943	The Marxist-oriented Indies Social Democratic Organization was founded in 1914. It adopted the name Communist Party of the Indies in 1920 and Communist Party of Indonesia in 1924. It was banned by the Dutch government in 1927 and operated underground.
Iran	Communist Party of Persia (HKI)	1920–1943	The first congress was held in Soviet-occupied territory in 1920. It went underground after 1931.
Iraq	Iraqi Communist Party (CPI)	1935–1943	A Committee to Combat Imperialism and Exploitation was founded in 1934 and changed its name to the Communist Party of Iraq in 1935.
Ireland	Communist Party of Ireland (CPI)	1933–1940	Founded in 1933. It was disbanded in the southern Irish Free State by the government in 1940 but continued in Ulster as the Communist Party of Northern Ireland.
Italy	Italian Socialist Party (PSI)	1919–1921	As a national section, it is the only former Second International member party as well as the first outside of the former Russian Empire to join. It was expelled in 1921 after its left-wing split off into the Communist Party of Italy (PCd'I).
Italy	Communist Party of Italy (PCd'I)	1921–1943	Founded in 1921 from a split in the Italian Socialist Party. It was forced underground by fascist government repression from 1926 to 1943.
Japan	Japanese Communist Party (JCP)	1922–1943	Founded as an illegal party in 1922.
Kazakhstan	Communist Party of Kazakhstan (KKP)	1921–1943	Founded in 1921. Became a regional organization of the All-Union Communist Party (Bolshevik) in 1925.
Kyrgyzstan	Communist Party of Kirghizia (KKP)	1919–1943	Founded as the Communist Party (Bolshevik) of Turkestan in 1918. It was renamed the Communist Party (Bolshevik) of Kirgizia in 1937.
Korea	Communist Party of Korea (CKD)	1925–1928	Founded in Seoul in 1925 as an illegal organization. It was decimated by Japanese government repressions, and its recognition was rescinded by the Comintern in 1928.
Latvia	Communist Party of Latvia (LKP)	1919–1940	Founded in 1919 from elements of the Latvian Social Democratic Workers' Party. It operated underground until 1940, when it was incorporated as a branch of the All-Union Communist Party (Bolshevik).
Lebanon and Syria	Syrian–Lebanese Communist Party (PCSL)	1924–1943	Founded in 1924 as the Lebanese People's Party. It later became the Syrian–Lebanese Communist Party. In 1944, it divided into separate Lebanese and Syrian parties.
Lithuania	Communist Party of Lithuania (LKP)	1919–1940	Founded in 1918 as the Communist Party of Lithuania and Belorussia. It emerged as a separate party in 1920 and operated underground until 1940, when it was incorporated into the All-Union Communist Party (Bolshevik).
Luxembourg	Communist Party of Luxembourg (PCL)	1921–1943	Founded in 1921 from a split in the Luxembourg Social Democratic Party. It went underground during the German occupation.
Malaya	Communist Party of Malaya (CPM)	1930–1943	Founded in 1930, succeeding the South Seas Communist Party founded in 1928.
Martinique	Martinican Communist Party (PCM)	1925–1943	The Jean Jaurès Communist Group was founded in 1923 and became a section of the French Communist Party in 1925. It was dissolved by the French government in 1939.
Mexico	Mexican Communist Party (PCM)	1920–1943	Founded in 1920 from several communist groups.
Morocco	Moroccan Communist Party (PCM)	1936–1943	The "Moroccan region" of the French Communist Party was founded in 1936 and dissolved in 1939. It was revived as the Moroccan Communist Party in 1943.
Netherlands	Communist Party of the Netherlands (CPN)	1919–1943	Founded as the Communist Party of Holland in 1918. It was renamed in 1935 and went underground during the German occupation.
New Zealand	Communist Party of New Zealand (CPNZ)	1926–1943	Founded in 1921. It was a section of the Communist Party of Australia in 1924, but regained independence in 1926.
Nicaragua	Socialist Party of Nicaragua (PSN)	1937–1943	Founded in 1937. It was suppressed by the government from 1939 to 1945.
Norway	Norwegian Labour Party (DNA)	1919–1923	Exited in 1923 after split of the Communist Party of Norway.
Norway	Communist Party of Norway (NKP)	1923–1943	Founded in 1923 from a split in the Norwegian Labor Party. It went underground during the German occupation.
Mongolia	Mongolian People's Revolutionary Party (MPRP)	1921–1943	The Mongolian People's Party was founded in 1921 and changed its name to the Mongolian People's Revolutionary Party in 1924.
Palestine	Palestine Communist Party (PCP)	1922–1943	Founded in 1922. It operated as separate Jewish and Arab groups from 1939 to 1948.
Panama	Communist Party of Panama (PCP)	1935–1943	Founded in 1930. Affiliated with the Comintern in 1935.
Paraguay	Paraguayan Communist Party (PCP)	1928–1943	Founded in 1928. Outlawed in 1936.
Peru	Peruvian Communist Party (PCP)	1930–1943	Founded as the Peruvian Socialist Party in 1928 and renamed in 1930.
Philippines	Communist Party of the Philippines (PKP)	1930–1943	Founded in 1930. It was declared illegal in 1932 but its legal status was restored in 1938.
Poland	Communist Party of Poland (KPP)	1919–1938	Founded as the Communist Workers' Party of Poland in 1918. It changed its name in 1925. The Comintern disbanded it in 1938. The Polish Workers' Party was revived in Moscow in 1941 and "founded" in Warsaw in 1942.
Portugal	Portuguese Communist Party (PCP)	1921–1943	Founded in 1921. It has been outlawed several times.
Romania	Romanian Communist Party (PCR)	1921–1943	Founded in 1921. It operated underground until 1944.
Slovakia	Communist Party of Slovakia (KSS)	1938–1943	Founded after Slovakia declared independence in 1938. It operated underground during the war.
South Africa	Communist Party of South Africa (CPSA)	1921–1943	Founded as the Communist Party of Africa in 1921.
Spain	Spanish Communist Party (PCE)	1920–1943	The Federation of Socialist Youth adopted the name Spanish Communist Party in April 1920. In July 1920, the Spanish Communist Workers' Party was founded. The two merged in 1921 as the Communist Party of Spain. It was outlawed several times.
Sweden	Communist Party of Sweden (SKP)	1919–1943	The Social Democratic Left Party of Sweden joined the Comintern in 1919 and changed its name to the Communist Party of Sweden in 1921. A split from 1929 to 1934 produced two rival communist parties.
Switzerland	Communist Party of Switzerland (KPS)	1921–1940	Founded in 1921. It was outlawed in 1940 and revived as the Swiss Party of Labour in 1944.
Tajikistan	Communist Party of Turkestan (KPT)	1919–1929	The Communist Party of Turkestan was founded in 1918. The regional party organization became an adjunct of the All-Union Communist Party (Bolshevik) in 1929.
Thailand	Communist Party of Thailand (CPT)	1942–1943	Founded in 1942.
Tunisia	Tunisian Communist Party (PCT)	1920–1943	Founded as the Tunisian Federation of the French Communist Party in 1920. It became the Communist Party of Tunisia in 1934 and was dissolved by French authorities in 1939, resuming legal activities in 1943.
Turkey	Communist Party of Turkey (TKP)	1920–1943	An Executive Committee of Turkish Socialist-Communists was established in Moscow in 1918, becoming the Turkish Communist Party in 1920. Separately, the Turkish Communist Party was founded in Istanbul in 1920 and operated illegally.
Turkmenistan	Communist Party of Turkmenistan (KPT)	1920–1943	Founded in 1920 as a section of the Russian Communist Party (Bolshevik).
Ukraine	Communist Party of Ukraine (KPU)	1919–1943	Founded in April 1918, independent of the Russian Communist Party (Bolshevik). In July 1918, it became an autonomous part and in 1919 a regional organization within the Russian party.
Soviet Union	Communist Party of the Soviet Union (CPSU)	1919–1943	The Russian Social Democratic Labour Party (RSDLP) split into Bolsheviks and Mensheviks in 1903. The Bolshevik faction adopted the name Russian Communist Party (Bolshevik) in 1918, which became the All-Union Communist Party (Bolsheviks) in 1925. Its branches included the communist parties of Armenia, Azerbaijan, Belorussia, Estonia, Georgia, Kazakhstan, Kyrgyzstan, Latvia, Lithuania, Tajikistan, Turkmenistan, Ukraine, and Uzbekistan.
United Kingdom	Communist Party of Great Britain (CPGB)	1920–1943	Founded in 1920. It was never outlawed.
United States	Communist Party USA (CPUSA)	1919–1943	The Communist Party of America and the Communist Labor Party were founded in 1919 and driven underground in 1920. After several mergers, they emerged in the legal Workers' Party of America in 1923, which became the Communist Party of the United States of America in 1926.
Uruguay	Communist Party of Uruguay (PCU)	1920–1943	Founded in 1920. It has never changed its name and has never been outlawed.
Uzbekistan	Communist Party of Uzbekistan (KPU)	1919–1943	The Bukharan Communist Party and the Communist Party (Bolshevik) of Turkestan were founded in 1918. They merged with the Russian Communist Party (Bolshevik) in 1922. The Communist Party of Uzbekistan was founded in 1925 as a section of the Russian party.
Venezuela	Communist Party of Venezuela (PCV)	1935–1943	Founded in 1931. Affiliated with the Comintern in 1935.
Yugoslavia	Communist Party of Yugoslavia (KPJ)	1919–1943	Founded in April 1919 as the Socialist Workers' Party of Yugoslavia (Communist). It changed its name to the Communist Party of Yugoslavia in 1920 and operated underground until 1945.

=== Sponsored organizations ===
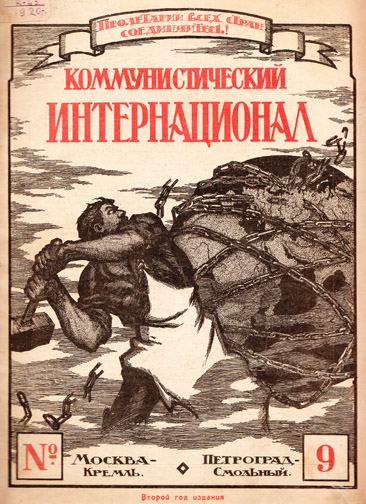
1920 Russian issue of the Communist International, the official magazine of the Comintern published in various European languages from 1919 to 1943

Several international organizations (communist fronts) were sponsored by the Comintern:

- Young Communist International (KIM, 1919–1943), founded in Berlin under Willi Münzenberg
- Red International of Labour Unions (Profintern, 1920–1937), designed to fight the "Amsterdam" International
- Communist Women's International (1920–1930)
- Workers International Relief (Mezhrabpom, 1921–1935), founded by Münzenberg in 1921 to coordinate famine relief efforts in Soviet Russia
- Red Sport International (Sportintern, 1921–1937)
- International Red Aid (MOPR, 1922–1941), an organization to provide material and moral support to "captives of capitalism in prison"
- Red Peasant International (Krestintern, 1923–1939), founded as a rival to the "Green" Peasant International
- International of the Proletarian Freethinkers (1925–1933)
- League Against Imperialism and Colonial Oppression (1927–1935)

=== Bureaus and training schools ===
In addition to its central apparatus in Moscow, the Comintern established several regional bureaus to coordinate its activities. Among the most important was the Berlin-based West European Secretariat (WES), founded in October 1919 under the leadership of Yakov Reich ("Thomas"). It served as a critical hub for communications, finance, and propaganda, channeling funds (including cash and diamonds) and directives from Moscow to the emerging communist parties in Europe. In the early 1920s, Weimar Berlin, with its large working-class movement and relatively loose controls, became the Comintern's most important outpost and a center for its transnational network of agents. The WES was reorganized in 1927 as the West European Bureau (WEB), with a much clearer line of political control from Moscow. Other bureaus included the Scandinavian Bureau, a Southern Bureau in Kiev, the Vienna Bureau, the Balkan Bureau, the Amsterdam Bureau, the Central Asian Bureau in Tashkent, and the Far Eastern Bureau, based for much of its existence in Shanghai.

A crucial part of the Comintern's structure was its system of political schools, designed to train cadres from around the world in communist theory and practice. The immense importance of this schooling was a key feature of the organization, as it produced a worldwide cadre of loyal communists. The four principal schools were:

- Communist University of the Toilers of the East (KUTV, 1921–1937) provided political education for cadres from Soviet Eastern republics and later admitted candidates from colonial and independent countries in the Middle East and Eastern Mediterranean.
- Communist University of the National Minorities of the West (KUNMZ, 1921–1936) initially trained cadres from the western national minorities of Soviet Russia, but later expanded to include militants from the Balkans, Italy, Central Europe, and Scandinavia.
- Moscow Sun Yat-sen University (1925–1930) specialized in training Chinese revolutionaries.
- International Lenin School (1926–1938), the Comintern's most advanced political school, training leading cadres from various communist parties.

== Historiography ==
The historiography of the Comintern is diverse and has evolved significantly, particularly with the opening of Soviet archives in the late 1980s. Early Western scholarship during the Cold War often depicted the Comintern as a monolithic tool of Soviet foreign policy, and found official Soviet historiography sanitized and ideologically controlled. Dissident communist critiques, such as those by former members like Franz Borkenau or Trotskyist writers, often focused on the Comintern's degeneration under Stalin compared to an idealized Leninist phase.

Other studies, including those by E. H. Carr and Fernando Claudin, offer more nuanced interpretations. Carr analyzed the Comintern's relationship with Soviet foreign policy, allowing for a degree of autonomous action by Comintern leaders and national parties. Claudin, in his Marxist analysis, argued that the Comintern was marked by a "crisis of theory" from its inception, as it failed to differentiate between Russian and Western European conditions leading to flawed strategies.

The opening of the Comintern archives in Moscow spurred new research, often confirming the extent of Soviet control, particularly under Stalin, but also revealing internal debates within the Comintern apparatus and complexities in the relationship between the center and national sections. There is ongoing debate about the degree of autonomy retained by national parties and the interplay between Moscow's directives and indigenous factors in shaping communist policies. More recent scholarship has also adopted a transnational and global history perspective, focusing on the Comintern as a network and on the lives and experiences of cadres operating across borders, treating the organization as a unique "lifeworld" with its own practices and culture.

== Legacy ==
The Comintern's legacy is another site of ongoing debate. In the 1920s it nurtured a range of theoretical responses to contemporary problems from figures like Trotsky, Bukharin, and Antonio Gramsci. Opponents claim the Comintern transformed from an instrument for world revolution into an instrument of Soviet foreign policy, particularly under Stalin, undergoing processes of Bolshevisation and centralisation that led to the demotion, expulsion, and purging of those who resisted Moscow's line. The Comintern supported the Soviet Union through contentious acts like the Great Purge and the Nazi–Soviet Pact, and its hostility towards syndicalism and other currents of revolutionary socialism drove out figures like Alfred Rosmer, Pierre Monatte, Ángel Pestaña, and Martin Tranmæl. Democratic socialist historian G. D. H. Cole argues that the Comintern's "social fascism" theory helped fascism come to power in Italy and Germany by deliberately setting out to split the world's socialist movements, seeing reformists and centrists as "social traitors" and dividing working class forces.

Trotskyists and other anti-Soviet Leninists claim the Comintern universalised a Bolshevik model specific to Russian conditions, the core reason for the Comintern's failures and a Stalinist "ossification" of Marxist thought that hindered the development of strategies more applicable to diverse national conditions. Others blame not just Stalin but Leninism itself, finding the Leninist party structure and its associated dogmas an enduring constraint on communist parties adapting to changing post-war realities. Socialist historian Julius Braunthal argued that Lenin's doctrine "wrecked the unity of the international workers movement... and, in Italy and Germany, paved the way for Fascism".

The Comintern ultimately failed to achieve its original aims of worldwide socialist revolution and colonial liberation, overseeing a series of disappointments such as the German October of 1923 and the British general strike of 1926. Nonetheless, the Comintern represented a unique historical experiment in creating a global and transnational network supporting emancipatory movements, and gave a voice to oppressed groups such as the working class, women, and the peoples of the colonies. During the Popular Front era and World War II, communists were among the most active anti-fascists, notably organizing the International Brigades in the Spanish Civil War, though this support was also used to enforce Soviet orthodoxy and suppress other left-wing groups. The threat of communism may also have spurred capitalist governments to undertake social reforms. After World War II, communism expanded significantly, with organized communists numbering fourteen million outside the Soviet Union by the end of 1945. This growth was partly due to the Soviet war effort and the groundwork laid by the Comintern in consolidating disciplined communist parties.

== See also ==
- Anti-Comintern Pact (1936)
- Communist Workers' International (KAI)
- Fourth International (est. 1938)
- Historiography in the Soviet Union
- International Communist Opposition
- International Entente Against the Third International
- International Revolutionary Marxist Centre
- List of left-wing internationals
- Post–World War II anti-fascism
- Relations between Japanese revolutionaries, the Comintern and the Soviet Union
- Socialist International (est. 1951)
- Soviet empire
- Timeline of the Cold War
  - Origins of the Cold War
  - Cold War (1947–1948)
  - Cold War (1948–1953)
- Western Marxism
