= 7th World Congress of the Comintern =

1935 conference

7th World Congress of the Communist International Седьмой конгресс Коммунистического интернационала
- Begins: 25 July 1935
- Ends: 20 August 1935
- Location: Moscow
- Country: Russian Soviet Federative Socialist Republic
- Most recent: 17 July 1928
- Previous event: 6th Congress
- Participants: 513 delegates from 65 parties

The Seventh World Congress of the Communist International (Comintern) was a multinational conference held in Moscow from 25 July to 20 August 1935 by delegated representatives of ruling and non-ruling communist parties from around the world and invited guests representing other political and organized labor organizations. The gathering was attended by 513 delegates, of whom 371 were accorded full voting rights, representing 65 Comintern member parties as well as 19 sympathizing parties.

The gathering is best remembered for its endorsement of a Popular Front of communist and non-communist forces against the growing menace of fascism in Europe, paving the way for advocacy of collective security between the Soviet Union and the various capitalist states of Europe. This marked a dramatic reversal of the Comintern's previous orientation towards class warfare endorsed by the 6th World Congress of 1928, the aggressive line of the "Third Period".

== History ==
=== Background ===
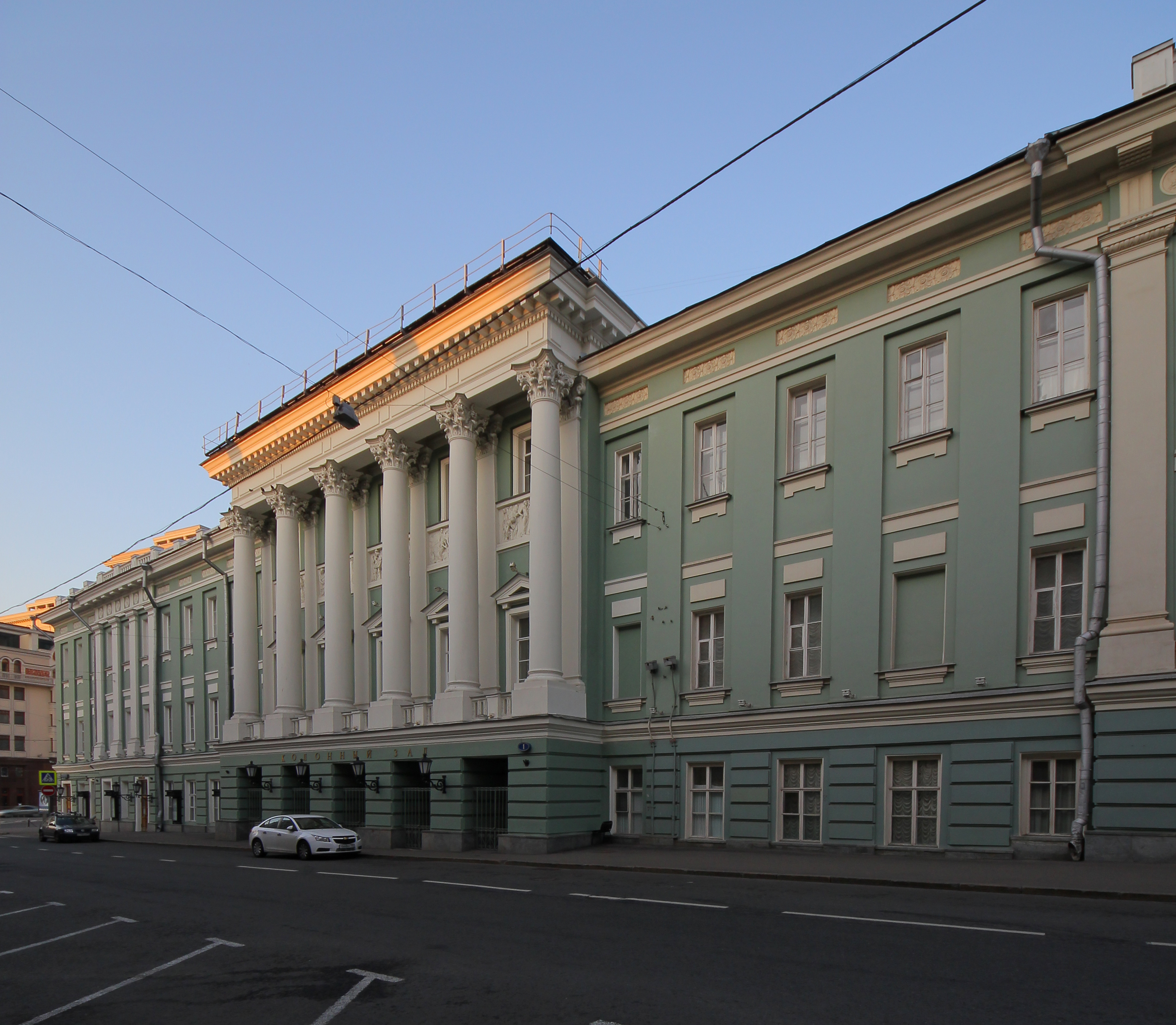
The House of Unions in Moscow, site of the 7th World Congress of the Comintern, as it appears today.

Throughout the early 1930s the Soviet Union's People's Commissariat of Foreign Affairs, headed by Maxim Litvinov, had pursued a policy of attempting to win a broad international agreement to bring about military disarmament. This initiative had clearly reached a terminal impasse from the Nazi seizure of power in January 1933, however, with the new political reality writ large by the October 1933 departure of Nazi Germany from the Geneva disarmament negotiations.

Still, there was little motion among the world communist movement towards construction of a broader united front with the socialist movement and their affiliated trade unions, with the Comintern continuing to train its rhetorical guns on the social democratic movement, which was held to have sabotaged the effort of the Communist Party of Germany to wage battle against fascism by propagating what the communists characterized as its "anti-Marxist theory of a 'peaceful,' 'democratic' road to socialism" among the German workers' movement.

There were some within the communist movement who began feeling their way to a new more collaborative orientation, however. The February 1934 Uprising of Socialists against right wing forces in Austria and movement towards cooperation between Socialists and Communists in France in fighting a nascent fascist movement there convinced Bulgarian Communist Georgi Dimitrov, a leading figure in the Communist International that the Comintern's hostility towards joint action between Communists and Socialists was ill-considered. Dimitrov made his triumphant return to Moscow in April 1934 following acquittal in the Reichstag Fire trial determined to change the Comintern's fundamental strategy from one of antagonistic opposition to social democracy to one of cooperation in a joint struggle.

Preparations for a 7th World Congress of the Comintern began in Moscow late in 1934, with the Executive Committee of the Communist International (ECCI) establishing a commission to draft programmatic resolutions for that body. This body was divided between Dimitrov and others advocating a move towards a "general democratic, anti-Fascist" orientation and hardliners who continued to argue that the battle against fascism was inseparable from the task of overthrowing the bourgeoisie, implying a simultaneous fight against the fascist right and the reformist constitutionalist and socialist movements. With no rapid agreement forthcoming, on 8 March 1935, the scheduled opening of the 7th Congress was moved back to the end of July.

It would be the exigencies of Soviet foreign policy which ultimately shaped the Comintern's orientation, when on 2 May 1935, the two countries most concerned about the implications of growing German militarism — France and the Soviet Union — concluded the Franco-Soviet Treaty of Mutual Assistance, a mutual aid pact in which each promised to come to the other's defense in the event that aggression violating the Covenant of the League of Nations was suffered. Shortly thereafter, two days of consultations in Moscow between French Foreign Minister Pierre Laval and Soviet chiefs Joseph Stalin, Viacheslav Molotov, and Maxim Litvinov helped to solidify the agreement through a joint communique in which the parties agreed "not to allow their means of national defense to weaken in any respect" and which recognized France's right to "maintain her armed forces at a level consonant with her security".

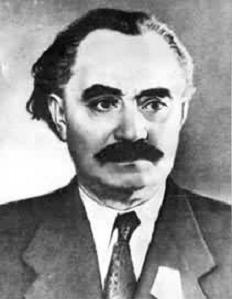
The Popular Front tactic is closely associated with the initiative of one of its early adherents, Bulgarian Communist Georgi Dimitrov (1882–1949).

The May 1935 treaty and formal communique between France and the USSR tilted the scale decisively towards a new Comintern policy for the Communist Parties of the world, casting aside the old Third Period line of "class against class" for the overthrow of the bourgeoisie in favor of a new policy of realpolitik, defending the Russian revolution by supporting mutual defense agreements between the USSR and various capitalist states. Further marking this shift in the international political line of the Comintern was the appointment of Popular Front adherent Georgi Dimitrov as new head of the Communist International. The stage was therefore set for the belated convocation of the Comintern's 7th World Congress.

=== Convocation ===
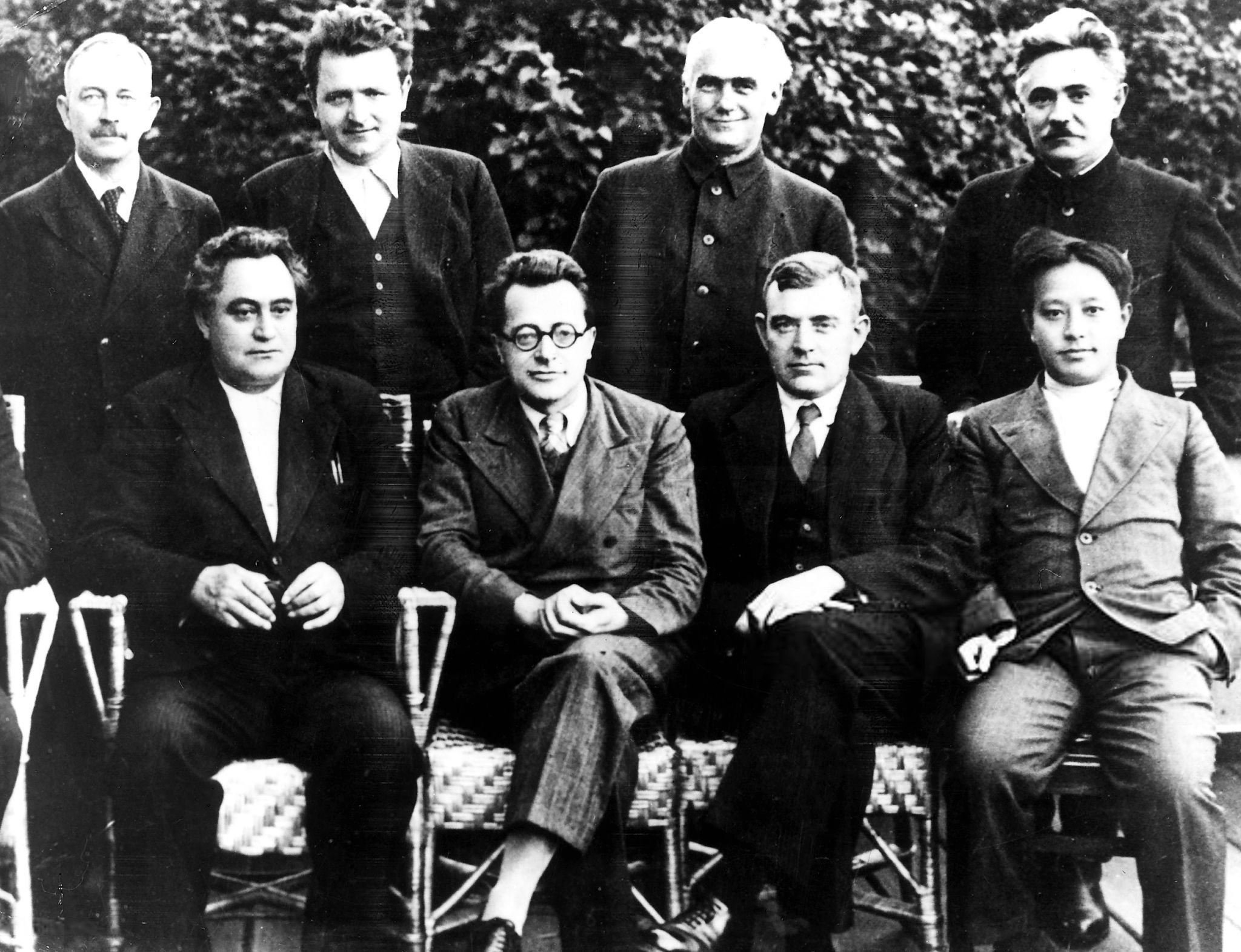
Members of the Executive Committee of the Comintern at the 7th World Congress, 1935. Seated (L-R): Georgi Dimitrov, Palmiro Togliatti, Wilhelm Florin, Wang Ming. Standing: Otto Kuusinen, Dmitry Manuilsky, Klement Gottwald, Wilhelm Pieck.

The 7th World Congress of the Communist International opened on the evening of 25 July 1935 in the Hall of Pillars of the House of the Unions in Moscow. The gathering, which was convened almost exactly seven years since the conclusion of the last Comintern World Congress, was attended by 513 delegates, of whom 371 were accorded full voting rights, representing 65 Comintern member parties as well as 19 sympathizing parties. In keeping with his personal tradition and relative lack of interest in Comintern affairs, the proceedings were not attended by All-Union Communist Party General Secretary Joseph Stalin, who had by this time risen to a position of unquestioned supremacy in the Soviet firmament.

Despite his absence, Stalin was lauded in a cult-like manner, with every mention of the Soviet leader's name being met by "tumultuous applause" from the gathered delegates.

=== Pieck's keynote report ===
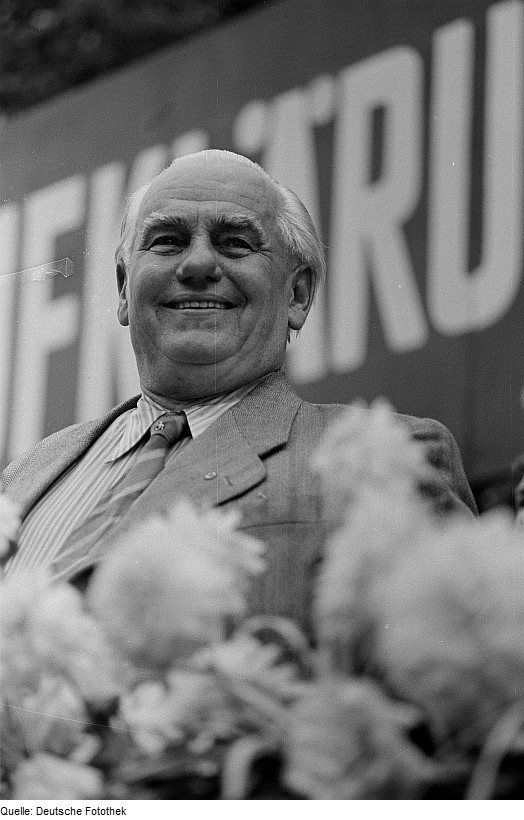
Wilhelm Pieck (1876–1960), first President of East Germany, as he appeared in his later years.

Setting the stage for the 7th World Congress was the keynote report on the Activities of ECCI, delivered on the second day by Wilhelm Pieck of the Communist Party of Germany. While lauding the 1928 tactic of "class against class" which was "directed against the bloc of the Social Democrats with the bourgeoisie and aimed at destroying the bloc of the Social Democratic leaders with the bourgeoisie," Pieck nevertheless acknowledged that "a certain number of sectarian mistakes were committed." This push for ideologically pure leadership divided the workers' movement during the strike movement of the late 1920s, gaining the support of some workers while alienating others and ultimately failing owing to "clumsy and sectarian tactics."

Pieck argued that with the coming of the Great Depression the bourgeoisie sought to solve its problem of a collapsing internal market and declining profits with a move towards seizure and plunder of foreign territory under the banner of fascism, with the aggression of militarist Japan in Manchuria and the rise of Nazi Germany said to epitomize the new trend. "These preparations are simultaneously and primarily designed for the destruction of the Soviet Union, the home, the basis, and the bulwark of the proletarian revolution," Pieck declared.

Pieck identified the "defeat of the German proletariat" and the rise of Nazism as the "greatest event that marked the first years of the crisis in the capitalist countries," stating that from the spring of 1932 it had "already become evident that the fascists had a considerable advantage over the Communists in the matter of mobilizing the masses. The communists had attempted to change the situation by proposing a united front with the Social Democratic Party of Germany and its associated trade union federation, the Allgemeiner Deutscher Gewerkschaftsbund (ADGB). This effort had been rebuffed, Pieck said, with the failure of the Social Democratic political and labor movement to join general strikes following the expulsion of socialist ministers from the government of Prussia in July 1932 and the coming to power of the Hitler government in January 1933 singled out for specific criticism.

Omitting the fact that the Comintern's "class against class" line had been targeted directly at the Social Democrats, who had been castigated as "social fascists" in no way better than the actual fascist movement, Pieck declared that the Communists had done "everything in their power to mobilize the laboring masses for a revolutionary struggle to prevent the fascist dictatorship," only to be stymied when the Social Democrats "did not abandon their hostile attitude to the united front and the struggle." Only now, Pieck declared, had a new era been ushered in with a "turn of the Socialist workers towards a united front with the Communists."

A variety of factors had contributed to the new attitude of the Socialists towards the Communists, according to Pieck, including the "final and irrevocable victory of socialism in the Soviet Union" on the one hand and the brutal reality of fascist dictatorship in Germany on the other. The defense of Communism made by Dimitrov at the Leipzig trial, a general strike in France in February 1934, and armed battles against the fascists in Austria in February 1934 and in Spain in October 1934 had further consolidated this trend towards interparty cooperation, Pieck declared. Consequently, Pieck noted, "United Front agreements have been reached between the Communists and Socialists in Austria, Spain, and Italy" with additional mass actions taking place between rank-and-file party members without the blessing of Socialist leaders in Great Britain, the United States, Poland, and Czechoslovakia.

=== Dimitrov's report on unity against fascism ===
After Pieck's keynote report and the extended discussion which ensued came on 2 August a second watershed report, this by Georgi Dimitrov on the task of building unity of the working class in opposition to fascism. The appearance of Dimitrov on the platform, a great hero of the communist movement since his victory at the Leipzig trial, was met by a resounding ovation of the gathered delegates and a rousing singing of "The Internationale."

Dimitrov began with an analysis of fascism, which he characterized as "the open terrorist dictatorship of the most reactionary, most chauvinistic, and most imperialist elements of finance capital," intent upon wreaking organized "terrorist vengeance against the working class and the revolutionary section of the peasantry and intelligentsia." With respect to its foreign policy, Dimitrov condemned fascism as "jingoism in its most brutal form, fomenting bestial hatred of other nations."

In marked juxtaposition to the previous international communist line, which intentionally muddied the difference between "fascism" and "social fascism" in an effort to break common workers away from their social democratic political and trade union leadership, Dimitrov depicted the establishment of fascism as a definite break in the fundamental form of governance from "one state form of class domination of the bourgeoisie — bourgeois democracy — by another form — open terrorist dictatorship." Fascism's victory would suppress the "democratic liberties of the working people," curtail "the rights of parliament," and intensify repression of the revolutionary movement, Dimitrov warned.

== See also ==
- August 1 Declaration
- Anti-Comintern Pact
