= Third Period =

Communist ideological concept

The Third Period is an ideological concept adopted by the Communist International (Comintern) at its Sixth World Congress, held in Moscow in the summer of 1928. It set policy until reversed after the Nazis took over Germany in 1933.

The Comintern's theory was based on its economic and political analysis of world capitalism, which posited the division of recent history into three periods. These included a "First Period" that followed World War I and saw the revolutionary upsurge and then defeat of the working class, as well as a "Second Period" of capitalist consolidation for most of the decade of the 1920s. According to the Comintern's analysis, the current phase of world economy from 1928 onward, the "Third Period", was to be a time of widespread economic collapse and mass working class radicalization. This economic and political discord would again make the time ripe for proletarian revolution if militant policies were rigidly maintained by communist vanguard parties, the Comintern believed.

Communist policies during the Third Period were marked by pronounced hostility to reformism and political organizations espousing it as an impediment to the movement's revolutionary objectives. In the field of trade unions, a move was made during the Third Period towards the establishment of radical dual unions under communist party control rather than continuation of the previous policy of attempting to radicalize existing unions by "boring from within".

The rise of the Nazi Party to power in Germany in 1933 and the annihilation of the organized Communist movement there shocked the Comintern into reassessing the tactics of the Third Period. From 1934, new alliances began to be formed under the aegis of the "Popular Front". The Popular Front policy was formalized as the official policy of the world Communist movement by the Seventh World Congress of the Comintern in 1935.

== Political and theoretic basis ==
Although the term "Third Period" is closely associated with Stalin, it was first coined by Bukharin in 1926, at the Seventh Plenum of the ECCI to describe the conditions for further revolutions outside Russia. The view of the Comintern was that after the "First Period" of revolutionary upsurge in 1917 and the following years, a "Second Period" had followed in which capitalism stabilised itself and the international proletariat was pushed onto the defensive. In foreseeing a "Third Period", Bukharin sketched out the weaknesses inherent in capitalism which would lead to renewed class conflict. Principal among these, he argued, was a struggle for markets which would lead to intense pressures to reduce costs of production. These reductions would involve Taylorism as well as longer shifts and wage-cuts, driving wages down and unemployment up. The consequent lowering of living standards amongst the working class would lead to the intensification of class struggles and greater support for communism.

These periodic distinctions were important to the Comintern's work because they entailed different tactics on the part of communist parties outside the USSR. The "Second Period" was characterised by the "united front" policy (1923–1928) within which communist parties strove to work together with social democratic parties to defend the wages, jobs and rights of working-class people and build the political basis for the future dictatorship of the proletariat. The Third Period, in contrast, saw a sharp turn against these tactics in favour of "class against class" (1928–1934); here communist parties actively rejected collaboration with social democrats, attacking them as "social fascists" or, in Stalin's own formulation, "the moderate wing of fascism".

== Impact on the USSR ==
In December 1927, the All-Union Communist Party held its Fifteenth Party Congress; prior to this Congress, the faction of the Party led by Stalin had supported the continuation of the New Economic Policy (NEP). However, in the cities, industry had become undercapitalized, and prices were rising. In the countryside, moreover, the NEP had resulted in an enrichment of certain privileged sections of the Russian and Ukrainian peasantry (the Kulaks) because of deregulation of prices for grain.

These events were leading to growing economic and political instability. The towns were being threatened with a "chronic danger of famine" in 1928–1929. The Left Opposition had opposed the continued marketization of agriculture through the NEP, and, since 1924, had repeatedly called for investment in industry, some collectivization in agriculture and democratisation of the Party. Threatened by the growing power and revolt from the countryside led by the Kulaks and the strengthening bourgeoisie, the Fifteenth Congress of the All-Union Communist Party passed resolutions that supported some of the planks of the Opposition's platform, and on paper, the Congress' views appeared very left, politically. However, the Left Opposition was expelled.

The new policies of industrialisation and collectivisation now adopted were given the slogan "socialist accumulation". The Communist party had publicly proposed collectivisation to be voluntary; however, official policy was almost always ignored in practice; threats and false promises were used to motivate peasants into joining the communes. Eventually, in what Isaac Deutscher calls "the great change", the policies of industrialisation and collectivisation were carried out in a ruthless and brutal way, via the use of the security and military forces, without the direct involvement of the working class and peasantry itself and without seeming regard for the social consequences. According to figures given by Deutscher, the peasants opposed forced collectivisation by slaughtering 18 million horses, 30 million cattle, about 45 per cent of the total, and 100 million sheep and goats, about two thirds of the total. Those who engaged in these behaviours, deemed Kulaks, were dealt with harshly; in December 1929, Stalin issued a call to "liquidate the Kulaks as a class". A distinction was made between the elimination of the Kulaks as a class and the killing of the individuals themselves; nevertheless, at least 530,000 to 600,000 deaths resulted from dekulakization from 1929 to 1933, and Robert Conquest has estimated that there could have been as many as five million deaths. Kulaks could be shot or imprisoned by the GPU, have their property confiscated before being sent into internal exile (in Siberia, the North, the Urals, or Kazakhstan), or be evicted from their houses and sent to work in labour colonies in their own district. There is debate amongst historians as to whether the actions of the Kulaks and their supporters helped lead to famine, or whether the policy of collectivisation itself was responsible. (See Collectivisation in the USSR, Holodomor.)

== Impact on communist parties outside the USSR ==
In the West, the crisis of capitalism was coming to a head with the beginning of the Great Depression in 1929, and the Communist International's Sixth Congress viewed capitalism as entering a final death agony, its "third period of existence" where the first had been capitalism during its rise prior to World War I, and the second was the short period after the crushing of the post-World War I revolutions when capitalism seemed again to have stabilised.

The formal institution of the Third Period occurred at the 9th Plenum of the executive committee of the Communist International (E.C.C.I.) in February 1928. This helped in dovetailing the "Left" of the All-Union Communist party with that of the Comintern itself.

To the Comintern, a decisive and final revolutionary upheaval was afoot and all its sections had to prepare for the immediate advent of world revolution. As part of this theory, because the Comintern felt that conditions were strong enough, it demanded that its political positions within the workers' movement be consolidated and that all "reactionary" elements be purged. Accordingly, attacks and expulsions were launched against social democrats and moderate socialists within labour unions where the local communist party had majority support, as well as Trotskyists and united front proponents. The All-Union Communist Party also encouraged armed rebellion in China, Germany, and elsewhere.

Although shortcomings and crippling ideological vacillations brought this Period to an end, the tone of the "Third Period" resonated powerfully with the mood of many militant workers of the time, especially following the Stock Market Crash of 1929 and the ensuing crises of the 1930s. In many countries, including the United States, local Communist Parties' membership and influence grew as a result of the "Third Period" policies.

== "Social fascism" ==
One notable development in this period was that Communists organized the unemployed into a political force, despite their distance from the means of production. Another distinguishing feature of this policy was that Communists fought against their rivals on the left as vehemently as their opponents on the right of the political spectrum, with special viciousness directed at real or imaginary followers of Leon Trotsky. Social Democrats were targeted by Communist polemics, in which they were dubbed "social fascists."

Trotskyists have blamed Stalin's line for the rise of Nazism because it precluded unity between the German communists with the German Social Democrats. Hitler's rise to power, consequently, was also a reason for the abandonment of the policy in favor of the Popular Front strategy because Germany became the biggest security threat to the Soviet Union.

== North America ==
Historians of the left have debated the contribution made by Communist activism in North America during the Third Period. Some authors like Robin D. G. Kelley and John Manley have penned local histories that portray Communist Party members as effective activists, heroic in many cases because their revolutionary zeal helped them confront extremely adverse circumstances. Despite the shadow of Stalinism, in this perspective, the important positive contributions Communist organizers made in working class history should not be discounted.

Critics of this perspective argue that these histories gloss over or ignore both the horrors of Stalinism and also the devastating consequences of the Third Period inasmuch as it facilitated the rise of Hitler and alienated the working class writ large from the left because of its sectarianism and adventurism.

== See also ==
- Workers' Unity League (Canada)
- Trade Union Unity League (United States)
