= 6th World Congress of the Communist International =

6th World Congress of the Comintern Шестой конгресс Коммунистического интернационала
- Begins: July 17, 1928
- Ends: September 1, 1928
- Location: Moscow
- Country: Russian Soviet Federative Socialist Republic
- Previous event: 5th Congress
- Next event: 7th Congress
- Participants: 515 delegates from 65 parties

The Sixth Congress of the Communist International was held in Moscow from July 17 to September 1, 1928. The Congress was attended by 515 delegates from 65 organizations (including 50 Communist Parties) from 57 countries. Adopting the theory of the "Third Period", Congress proclaimed social democracy to be "social fascism".

== General assessment of the political environment ==
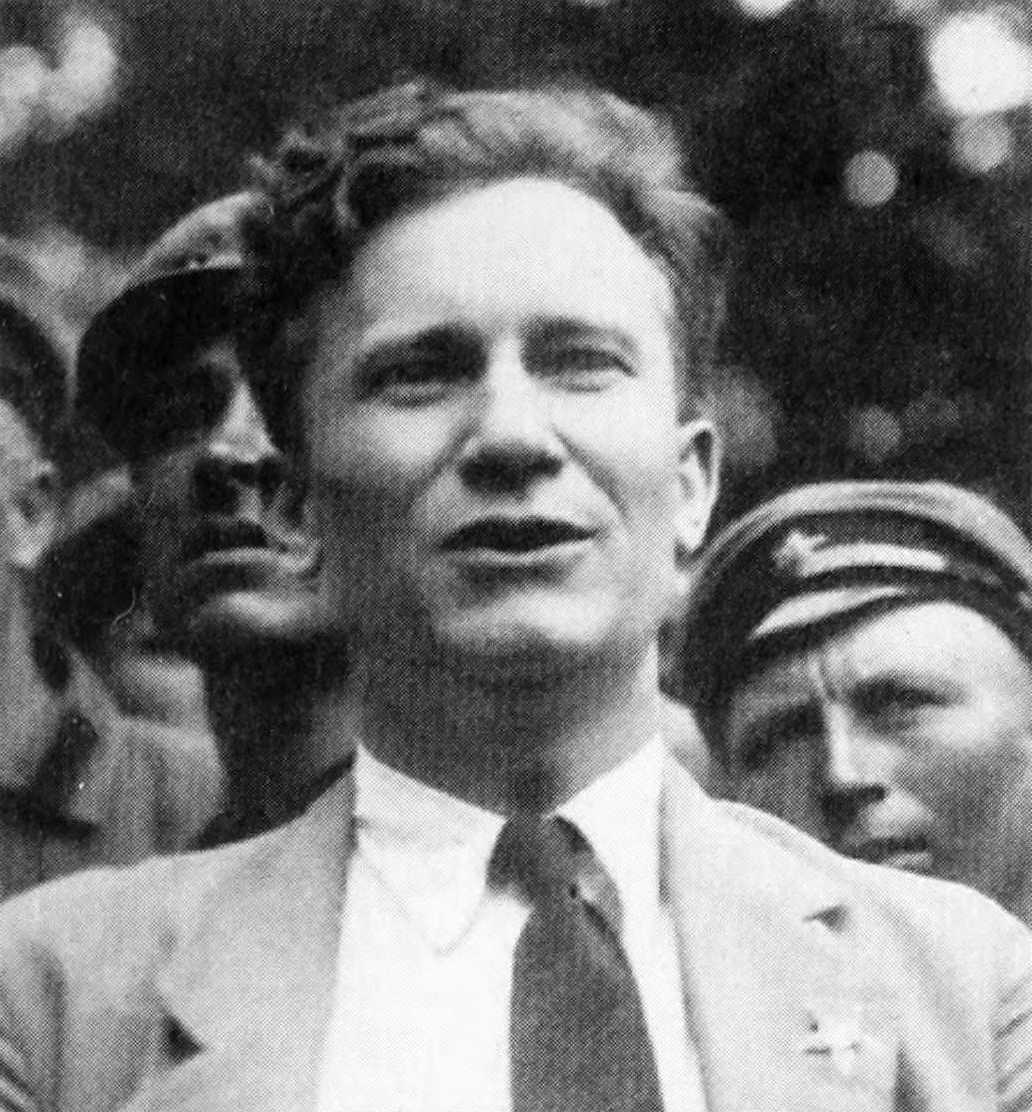
American Communist leader James P. Cannon alongside Red Army soldiers at the Congress

The Congress noted the approach of a new ("third") period in the revolutionary development of the world after the October Revolution - a period of a sharp exacerbation of all the contradictions of capitalism, characterized by an impending global economic crisis, an increase in class struggle and a new upsurge of the liberation movement in colonial and dependent countries. In this regard, the Congress approved the tactics outlined by the 9th plenum of the ECCI (February 1928), expressed by the formula "class against class".

== Social fascism thesis ==
The Congress developed the strategic directive adopted by the Fifth Congress (1924), according to which, in connection with the left turn of the masses in the capitalist countries, two equally hostile political forces confront the communists there: openly reactionary (fascism) and democratic reformist (social democracy). In accordance with this, the possibility of an alliance of communists with the social democratic parties in joint political actions and in pre-election blocs was rejected. The danger of the activities of the leaders of the "left wing" of social democracy was especially emphasized.

The thesis of "social fascism" was generally supported by the congress, only a small part of the delegates opposed it, in particular, the Italian delegation headed by Palmiro Togliatti.

Although the thesis was not included in the program of the Comintern adopted by the Congress, the provisions that social democracy often plays a fascist role in the most critical moments for capitalism, its ideology in many points being in contact with the fascist, were reflected in a number of documents of the congress.

== Program and Charter ==
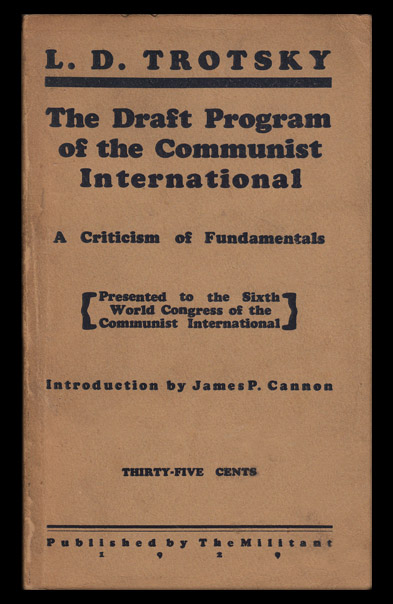
Leon Trotsky's criticism of the Comintern program appeared at this Congress, where it was translated into English by James P. Cannon and subsequently circulated in the United States and worldwide, sparking the emergence of Trotskyism as a distinct movement outside of the Soviet Union.

The Congress adopted the Program and Statutes of the Communist International, which stated that this organization was a "united world communist party."

The main work on the draft of the new Program was carried out by Nikolai Bukharin, on behalf of the Politburo of the Communist Party of the Soviet Union. After discussing it in the Politburo and subsequent revision, the draft was submitted to the ECCI and published on May 25 for discussion. In the course of preparation Joseph Stalin made a number of significant amendments to the text of the Program, making it more "leftist". The Program consolidated the rigid centralization of the leadership of the communist parties and the demand for "international communist discipline", which was to be expressed "in the unconditional implementation by all communists of the decisions of the governing bodies of the Communist International." The Congress' support for Stalin's line strengthened his line in the struggle against "right-wing" tendencies, in particular against Bukharin.

According to the Charter, in each country there could be only one Communist Party, called a section of the Comintern. The charter presupposed the obligation of strict international party discipline and the urgent implementation of the resolutions of the Comintern. The sections had the right to appeal against the decisions of the ECCI at the World Congress, but until the congress canceled the decisions of the sections, they were not relieved of the obligation to fulfill them. It was decided to expand the Executive Committee of the Comintern so that it included representatives of all sections united in the Comintern as members or candidates. According to the Charter, the rights of the delegates of the ECCI in certain sections of the Comintern were expanded.
