= Hermon F. Titus =

American socialist and editor (1852–1931)

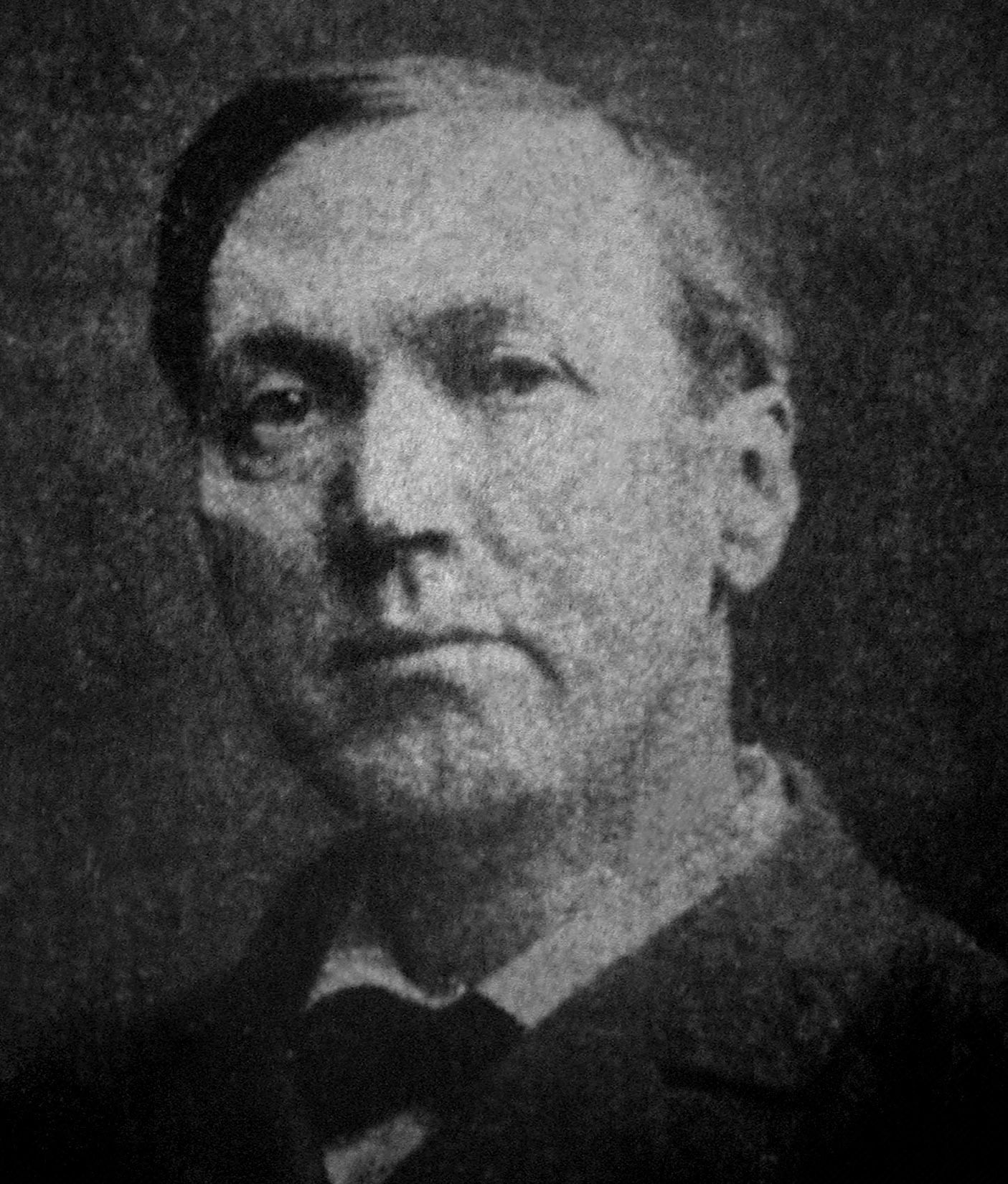
Titus was one of the leaders of the revolutionary socialist wings of the Socialist Party of America during the first decade of the 20th century.

Hermon Franklin Titus (1852–1931) was an American socialist activist and newspaper publisher. Originally a Baptist minister before becoming a medical doctor, Titus is best remembered as a factional leader of the Washington state affiliate of the Socialist Party of America (SPA) during the first decade of the 20th century and as editor of The Socialist, one of the most-widely circulated radical newspapers of that period. Titus led a party split from the Socialist Party of Washington in 1909 and helped found a short-lived organization called the Wage Workers Party. His paper failed with that organization and he died in self-chosen obscurity in New York City, a medical doctor working in a low paying service job.

== Biography ==
=== Early years ===
Hermon F. Titus was born in January 1852 in Pepperell, Massachusetts, the son of Moses Titus and Saphronia Patch Titus. As a boy Hermon worked on a farm, in a butcher shop, and in a paper mill, all the while attending school.

In 1864, in the midst of the American Civil War, the 12-year-old Hermon attempted to run away and enlist, but his father successfully tracked him down and returned him home.

Titus studied at Eastman's Business College in 1867, thereafter taking a job as a bookkeeper and clerk in a dry goods store in New York City, studying at night so that he could attend college.

Titus was an 1873 graduate of Madison University and of its theological seminary in 1876. After graduating the seminary, Titus had spent over a decade as a Baptist preacher in Ithaca, New York and Newton, Massachusetts before leaving the church owing to feelings that it did not adequately represent the teachings of Jesus.

Thereafter, Titus decided to become a medical doctor, enrolling in Harvard Medical School, from which he graduated in 1890. Upon graduation, Titus practiced medicine for two years in Newton before taking a job as a company doctor for the Great Northern Railway which brought him to Seattle in 1893, where he continued to work as a medical practitioner for the rest of the decade.

Titus was married and his wife, Hattie, worked as the manager of a small Seattle hotel that was widely used by radical speakers during their stops while making speaking tours of the Pacific Northwest. The pair would eventually separate with "Mother" Titus remaining in town after her former husband's departure as a venerated member of Seattle's radical community.

=== Political career ===
Titus's weekly, The Socialist, was an organizing tool for left-wing dissidents in the Socialist Party.

Toward the end of the 1890s, Titus was exposed to the ideas of Laurence Gronlund through the Fabian Society of Seattle and began to take an active interest in the ideas of municipal reform. Titus helped to draft a new city charter for Seattle and formed a Citizens' Non-Partisan League in 1900 to attempt to end the monopoly power wielded by the Seattle Electric Company. It was around this time that Titus was exposed to Marxist ideas for the first time. He became involved in a strike of Seattle telephone operators, attempting to win support for a proposed general strike from the Western Central Labor Union, but without success.

The candidacy of radical trade union organizer Eugene V. Debs for President of the United States in 1900 on the ticket of the Social Democratic Party of America inspired Titus and brought him to the next chapter of his diverse life story. After becoming the State Organizer of the Social Democratic Party of Washington in the summer of 1900, Titus launched Seattle's first explicitly socialist weekly newspaper on August 12 under the simple and direct title The Socialist. A total of 500 tabloid-sized copies were printed at a cost of $13. The first editorial office of the publication was the basement of Social Democratic Party headquarters, located at 220 Union Street in Seattle.

Titus also stood for office himself in the fall of 1900, running on the Social Democratic Party's ticket for U.S. Congressman.

Although initially conceived as a temporary publication associated with the needs of the Debs campaign, Titus soon came to see his new newspaper as a more permanent vehicle. Titus emerged as an aggressive opponent of the neo-Populist agrarian-oriented socialism touted by J.A. Wayland and his newspaper, The Appeal to Reason and thereby emerged as a leading national voice for a more assertive "proletarian" orientation. Young enthusiasts gathered around Titus and his newspaper, with Titus continuing to play the role of leader of the SPW's "Red faction" until about 1909.

Hermon Titus's second plunge into electoral politics came in the fall of 1901, when he and his party comrade John T. Oldman, ran for three year terms as directors on the King County Board of Education in Seattle. Together the pair received about 25 percent of the vote in a losing effort.

Titus ran in the December 1901 party election to be the SPW's National Committeeman, delegate to an annual governing convention. He was defeated in a seven-person race by just 3 votes by George Boomer — with an additional 8 votes for Titus from Local Tacoma arriving in the mail just after the deadline for counting.

In the fall election of 1902, Titus stood as the Socialist Party's candidate for Washington State Senate in the state's 36th Electoral District.

As a leader in the Socialist Party of Washington, Titus was regarded by some as a "dogmatic, dictatorial" personality, albeit with considerable intelligence and speaking skill. Titus regularly attacked those whom he deemed insufficiently stalwart in their commitment to revolutionary socialism, running on his front page the fire-breathing 1903 platform of Local Seattle next to the civic reform-oriented platform of Local Spokane under the headings "As Much Socialism as Possible" and "As Little Socialism as Possible," respectively and leading the charge to suspend and reorganize the local. Public ridicule of this sort at the expense of erstwhile comrades did little to advance the goal of a united Socialist Party of Washington. To his supporters, on the other hand, Titus's unflinching salvos at the temporizing half-measures of others were red meat for the faithful.

Local Seattle was deeply divided between radical and moderate faction, with some branches, such as Titus's Pike Street Branch, dominated by the left wing, while others, such as the Finnish branch and (after 1903) Central Branch, were firmly on the side of the centrist forces which had steadily come to dominate the national Socialist Party.

Pike Street Branch included radical true-believers such as Alfred Wagenknecht (future head of the Communist Labor Party), Elmer Allison (future editor of the Communist Party weekly, The Toiler), and Emil Herman (a political prisoner during World War I and Socialist Party organizer after his release). The Branch dedicated itself to attempts at winning over the working class to the socialist cause through soapbox speaking and public meetings — activities which frequently brought it into conflict with civic authorities. The moderate wing of the party, on the other hand, sought to build an electoral organization of broad popular appeal, in the hopes of winning political power through the ballot box and initiating a series of fundamental political reforms. These differing orientations, combined with Titus's pugnacious use of his newspaper as a tool for factional warfare, kept the Washington Socialist Party in a state of nearly perpetual internecine warfare.

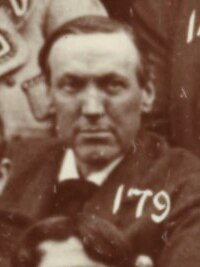
Titus at the first Socialist Party of America convention in Chicago, 1904

Despite a healthy national circulation of about 7,000, The Socialist consistently ran at a deficit — money made good by Titus and a handful of his closest supporters. Effective with its June 26, 1904 issue, The Socialist abruptly shifted from a heavily illustrated 4-page formate to a sparse 2-page sheet, running a headline on the front entitled "Shall The Socialist Live or Die?" This article noted that while the publication had been basically covering its expenses over a period of several months, for the past two months the publication had suddenly begun running at a deficit of $100 per month, an amount deemed unsustainable by the 35 members of the "Socialist Educational Union" headed by Hermon Titus back of the publication.

After a year of financial struggle, marked by an experimental change of the publication's name to Next and an attempt at making it a newspaper targeted to the broad public rather than limited to active Socialist Party members, the decision was made to revive the old name and to move The Socialist to Toledo, Ohio, effective in September 1904. This more central geographic location would give the newspaper a better chance for a wide national readership, it was hoped. Titus further expanded the paper's cachet by adding former National Executive Secretary of the Socialist Party William Mailly to the editorial staff. The paper continued to cover the activities of the Socialist Party of Washington in its pages each week, coverage written by correspondents.

In 1905 the moderate faction which dominated Central Branch of Local Seattle launched a referendum vote on new bylaws for the city which would have the effect of eliminating the existing branches in favor of a single organization broken down by electoral districts, with Local Seattle immediately taking possession of all assets belonging to its various branches. This proposal was regarded as a direct assault on the left-wing Pike Street Branch and was bitterly fought by Titus and his associates, which actively campaigned for defeat of the proposal. Part of this effort by Titus included an attempt to get members who had already hastily voted in favor of the measure to retract their votes. When the Seattle City Central Committee refused to provide adequate ballots for this purpose to the Pike Street Branch, Titus had small forms printed declaring the intention of the signatory to vote against the proposal. This provoked Titus's enemies in Central Branch of Local Seattle to prefer charges against Titus and the Pike Street Branch for election fraud for this and other smaller technical matters.

When Titus was cleared of these charges at a meeting of the full Seattle City Central Committee, a heated gathering which lasted 7 hours, Central Branch launched a statewide referendum vote against Titus. This vote closed on June 1, 1905, and exonerated Titus by a vote of 4-to-1. Of the 41 votes cast against Titus in the state, fully 35 came from Seattle Central Branch.

A further move of the paper brought it to Caldwell, Idaho, before finally returning to Seattle later in the decade.

=== Later years ===
Hermon F. Titus as he appeared in 1906.

In July 1909, outmaneuvered and outnumbered at the State Convention of the Socialist Party of Washington, Titus led the left-wing delegates out of the meeting hall to hold their own parallel convention and to elect their own officers, with a view to holding a referendum of Washington Socialists as to which of the dual State Committees was legitimate. The National Executive Committee of the Socialist Party of America intervened however, declaring the actions of the dissident radicals unconstitutional and recognizing the moderate-dominated regular convention.

Locked out of the Socialist Party, the left-wing dissidents decided against joining the existing Socialist Labor Party of America, instead seeking to build a new political organization from the ground up — a group called the Wage Workers Party (WWP). Future Communist Party leader William Z. Foster played a leading role in this organization and later recalled it in his memoirs.

The WWP was sort of a hybrid between the SLP and the IWW. It put in the center of its program its main demand in the fight within the SP. That is, the WWP sought to solve the question of proletarian versus petty bourgeois control of the party by restricting its membership solely to wage workers. It called itself 'a political union,' and its membership provisions specifically excluded 'capitalists, lawyers, preachers, doctors, dentists, detectives, soldiers, factory owners, policemen, superintendents, foremen, professors, and store-keepers.' It barred 'all with power to hire and fire,' but it evaded reference to farmers.' The program placed great stress upon industrial unionism, which in those times meant the IWW. It opposed the formation of a labor party. Its manifest anti-parliamentarianism was but thinly veiled. It outlined no immediate political demands and showed no conception of the role of the party in fighting for such demands ... ; the program contented itself with saying vaguely that it would support all struggles of the workers. The whole stress of the party work was placed upon industrial union action and revolutionary agitation and propaganda for the abolition of the capitalist system.

In connection with this change of status, Titus renamed his weekly The Workingman's Paper. The new organization was virtually stillborn, however, dissipating and dead by 1910. Titus's newspaper died with the new group, many of whom went on to join the Industrial Workers of the World (IWW).

Titus was broken as an effective leader of Washington state's radicals by the loss of his paper.

=== Death and legacy ===
In his later years the former Baptist preacher and medical doctor moved to New York City, where he worked in the wintertime as the uniformed doorman of a posh hotel. During the summer Titus returned to his roots as a physician, practicing medicine in upstate New York.

Titus produced one more political work before his death, a small and poorly circulated political pamphlet which came off the press in 1922 calling for unity between communists, socialists, and revolutionary industrial unionists. Only a single copy of this document seems to have survived. Neither Hermon nor Hattie Titus are found in the census of 1930.

Hermon Titus died in obscurity in New York City in 1931.

== See also ==
- Socialist Party of Washington

== Works ==
=== Books and pamphlets ===
- Poison Ivy and Poison Sumac. Newton, MA: Newton Journal Press, 1882.
- The ABC of Socialism. Toledo, OH: The Socialist, n.d. [c. 1906].
- The Old Ethics and the New: Two Editorials Reprinted from The Workingman's Paper of Seattle. Seattle: Trustee Publishing Co., n.d. [1910].
- Insurgency; or, the Economic Power of the Middle Class. With William Z. Foster. Seattle: Trustee Publishing Co., 1910. —Reprinted from The Workingman's Paper, issue of September 10, 1910.
- The Revolution in America: An Appeal to Socialists, Communists, Industrial Unionists, and All Radical Proletarians, to Adopt a Common Program of Action. New York: Hermon C. Titus, 1922.

=== Notable articles ===
- "The ABC of Socialism," The Socialist, whole no. 178 (Jan. 3, 1904), pg. 5.
- "An Object Lesson in Referendums," The Socialist, whole no. o. 241 (May 6, 1905), pg. 3.
