= Hulet M. Wells =

American political activist (1878–1970)

- Image of Wells published in the International Socialist Review in 1917.
- Born: May 4, 1878
- Died: February 15, 1970 (aged 91)
- Known for: Socialist and labor activist

Hulet Martell Wells (May 4, 1878 – February 15, 1970) was a Canadian-American socialist and president of the Seattle Central Labor Council, part of the American Federation of Labor. During the first decade of the 20th Century Wells was a leading participant in the free speech movement in Washington, running as the candidate of the Socialist Party of Washington for mayor of Seattle in 1912. Following a prison term for opposition to World War I, Wells reemerged as a labor and political activist, eventually founding the Unemployed Citizens' League of Seattle in 1931.

== Biography ==
=== Early years ===
Hulet Martell Wells was born May 4, 1878, near the small town of La Conner, located about 60 miles north of Seattle in what was then the Washington Territory of the United States. Wells' parents, Hiram and Alfreda Wells, hailed from Eastern Canada from which they emigrated in 1877, shortly after their marriage. The couple took advantage of the Homestead Act of 1862, establishing a land claim in rural Skagit County, Washington, and constructing a cabin there, where their first son was soon born. Hulet was the oldest of 10 children.

The Wells family were soon joined in Skagit County by relatives from the east, who joined in the farming of grain crops like oats and barley, as well as hay for silage. Wells' mother worked as a teacher in a small community school, while his father farmed and worked to enlarge the family home. The family was poor, forced to take a mortgage on the farm to pay for necessary supplies.

In 1892 Wells' father sold part of his La Conner farm to buy a 200-acre parcel near Fort Langley, British Columbia. Young Hulet returned to the native country of his parents, where he assisted in clearing the newly acquired land to make it ready for the raising of hay. Hulet later found his first paying employment working for a neighbor in his hayfield for a dollar a day. He was ultimately unable to receive even this pittance, with his employer pleading poverty. Wells later worked on a larger livestock and grain farm and as a section hand on the Canadian Pacific Railway.

Unemployment swept Canada in 1897 and that winter Hulet Wells was unable to find a job and was forced to return to the old family homestead in La Conner, Washington. The following spring he joined his father as part of the Klondike Gold Rush, heading to the Yukon Territory with a team of horses hauling living essentials for the pair. The elder Wells returned to the family farm that fall, but Hulet would remain in the Klondike for two years, failing as a miner and taking on a series of odd jobs sufficient to buy food and subsidize his gambling debts.

=== Return to Washington ===
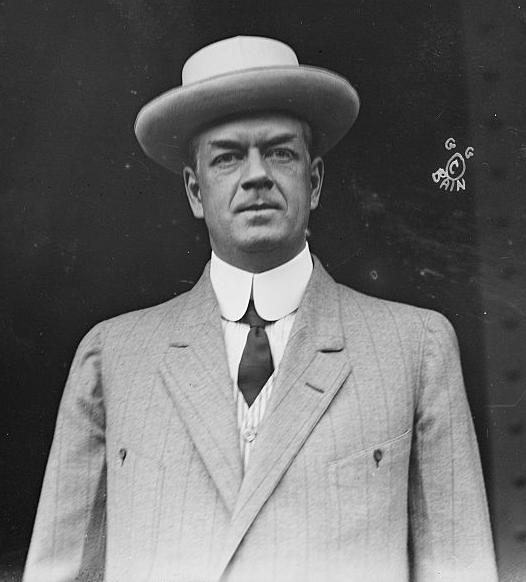
Hulet Wells' efforts to unionize Seattle postal workers led to his dismissal from the US Postal Service by Postmaster General Frank Harris Hitchcock.

As 1899 drew to a close, with another frigid winter on the way and his personal finances dissipated, Hulet Wells decided to return to the Pacific Northwest, booking passage on a steamer for Seattle. En route Wells developed a case of typhus, which forced his hospitalization in a ramshackle charity hospital upon his arrival in the booming town of about 80,000 people. Wells managed to recover his health and spent the next four years of his life as an itinerant worker, traveling from job to job across the state as a "blanket stiff" as a logger and a shingle weaver.

In the winter of 1902 his economic prospects improved (if not his physical conditions) when he obtained a job driving a team of horses to help grade city streets in Seattle in the winter rain. A return to the itinerant lifestyle followed but the seed was planted about the possibility of regular work in an urban setting. In 1904 Wells took the federal civil service examination, passing with high marks and soon gaining employment as a clerk at the Seattle post office.

Wells' postal job was difficult and poorly remunerated, with a workday ranging from 9 to 14 hours, six days a week, with poor pay and no benefits. Wells was dissatisfied with his job but felt compelled to remain, daunted by poor employment prospects elsewhere. In 1905 in the process of sorting newspapers on the job Wells came across a copy of the seminal socialist weekly Appeal to Reason. He found it compelling and soon began obtaining and reading various other socialist publications, thereby embarking on a lifetime path of radical political and trade union activity.

From 1905 to 1907 Wells studied law through the University of Washington, gaining admission to the Washington State Bar Association in 1907. Although he never entered legal practice, Wells next moved to attempt to organize postal workers, establishing a local union. This was met forcefully by Postmaster General Frank Hitchcock, who expelled Wells from further work in the postal service.

=== Mayoral campaign and its aftermath ===
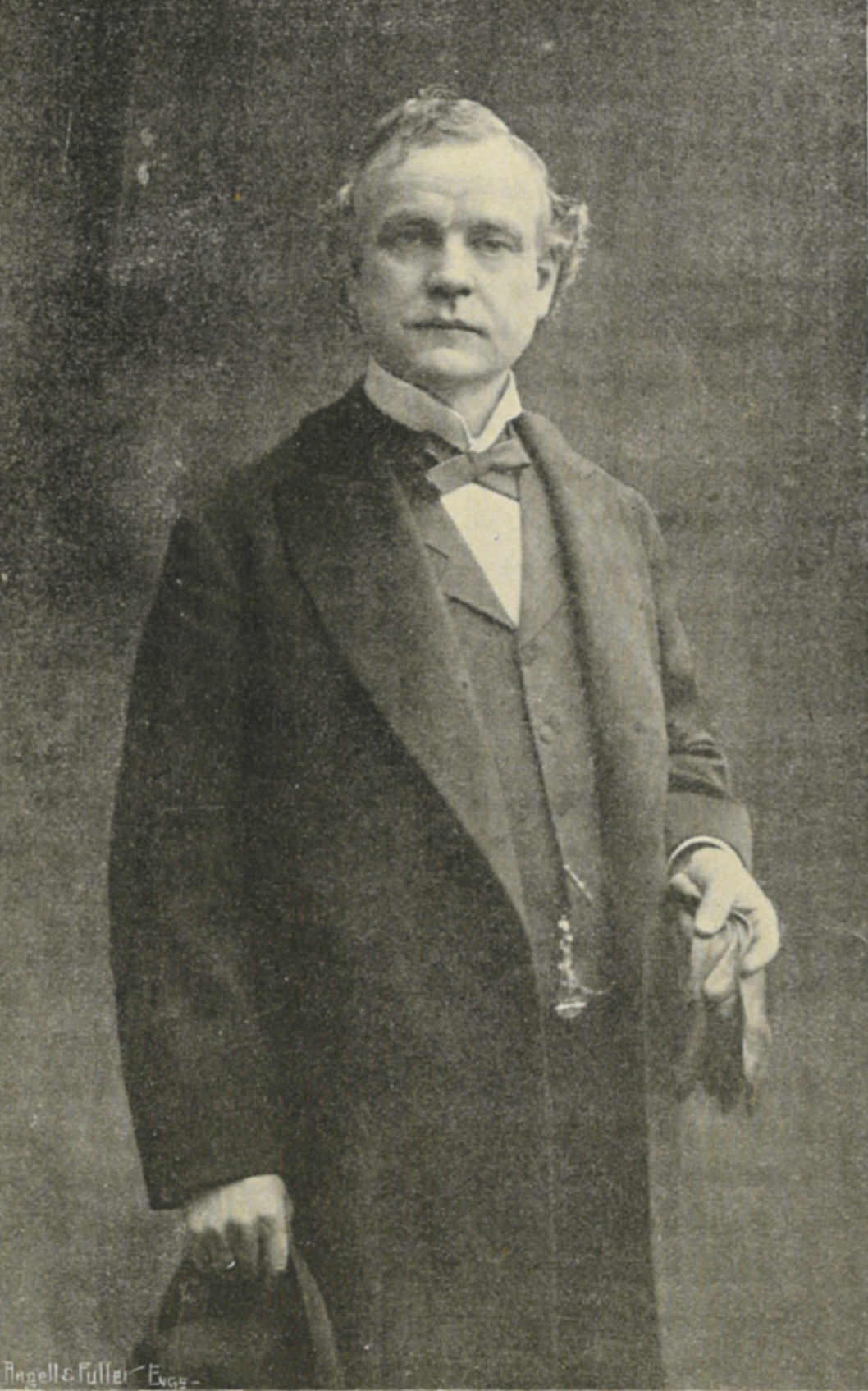
Seattle Times publisher and editor Alden J. Blethen was a personal nemesis of Wells and the radical political movement of Seattle.

In 1911 Wells became more deeply involved in Socialist Party politics, taking a position as editor of the Seattle weekly newspaper Socialist Voice. He was tapped as the party's candidate for mayor of Seattle in the 1912 campaign. Wells ran on a platform calling for government employment of the unemployed, emphasizing his own working class bona fides by declaring, "I do not pretend to represent anyone but the workingman, and have been a workingman all my life and understand their problems." Wells ultimately finished fourth in the race.

Wells' Spring 1912 mayoral campaign was ignored by the conservative Seattle Times, owned by Colonel Alden J. Blethen and the largest circulation newspaper in the city of Seattle. During the campaign Wells and his fellow Socialists opposed a development project strongly favored by Blethen, contributing to the plan's controversy and helping lead it to rejection by the Seattle Port Commission.

Two months after the rejection of the plan, 800 Seattle radicals from the Socialist Party and the Industrial Workers of the World (IWW) marched in honor of May Day marching in a column behind a red flag and the flag of the United States. A group of veterans of the Spanish–American War quickly rushed the parade, seizing the red flag. When the procession reached the Seattle Times building, another group of men charged from an adjoining alley and seized the American flag. Both the Times and the rival Seattle Post-Intelligencer printed provocative stories the next day alleging that the flag carried by the radicals in their march had been spat upon and trampled, with the Times going so far to allege that Wells had denounced Old Glory as a "dirty rag."

Despite the patently false nature of its reports, The Times continued to print allegations against Wells, who as a former mayoral candidate was the public face of the socialist movement. This prompted Wells to sue The Times for libel, alleging his character had been falsely besmirched. A trial was finally held in the spring of 1913, conducted by Judge John Humphries, a personal friend of Times publisher Blethen. Wells found the trial so farcically biased that he penned a satirical play based on the proceedings entitled The Colonel and His Friends, a work published as a pamphlet.

In 1913 Wells was chosen as the state chairman of the Socialist Party of Washington, the state affiliate of the Socialist Party of America.

=== Potlach Riot of 1913 ===
Wells was again embroiled in a riot in the summer of 1913. Secretary of the Navy Josephus Daniels was invited by the city of Seattle to be guest of honor at a banquet in honor of the city's third annual Golden Potlatch celebration on July 16. Daniels reviewed a parade of 2,000 members of the American military and an additional 2,000 members of local fraternal orders in conjunction with his visit, which was orchestrated in hopes that Daniels would recommend additional funding for the regional Bremerton Navy Yard.

Once again the Seattle Times rose to the occasion with sensationalistic headlines, declaring in a banner headline "Daniels Denounces Tolerance of Red Flag" despite the fact that Daniels' patriotic remarks at the banquet preceding the parade had been mild and banal. On the other side of town a scuffle between several passersby and a suffragist making a soapbox speech was falsely reported as a mob attacking five innocent sailors and soldiers. Swept into a frenzy by the hysterical reporting, on the evening of July 18, 1913, a mob of about 200 men, including members of the military and drunken revelers, ransacked local headquarters of the IWW and Socialist Party, smashing doors, window office equipment, and a wagon, and throwing books, documents, and newspapers in the street, where they were burned. Wells barely escaped the clutches of the mob.

The day after the so-called "Potlach Riot," Col. Bleven of The Times proudly endorsed the activities of the rioter, declaring "Anarchy, the grizzly hydra-headed serpent which Seattle has been force to nourish in its midst...was plucked from the city ad wiped out in a blaze of patriotism last night." In the aftermath of the riot, a scheduled staging of Wells' play at the Moore Theatre was cancelled by the management.

Wells was elected president of the Seattle Central Labor Council in 1915, serving in that capacity until 1916.

=== Sedition conviction ===
Wells was arrested and charged with sedition in the fall of 1917 for opposing the draft. He was tried together with Joseph Pass, a writer from New York City, and was sentenced to a prison term on March 18, 1918. Wells served his sentence at the McNeil Island Federal Penitentiary, located on McNeil Island in Pierce County, Washington. He was later transferred to Leavenworth Federal Penitentiary. While in prison, he was tortured; street rallies erupted among the labor movement in Seattle as a response.

Wells was released from prison on November 13, 1920, having received a commutation of his sentence.

=== Radical activities ===
Following his release from prison, Hulet Wells was thoroughly radicalized, turning away from the Socialist Party and towards the nascent American communist movement. In 1921 Wells was a fraternal delegate of the Seattle Central Labor Council to the founding congress of the Red International of Labor Unions (RILU, or Profintern). He also worked as a national lecturer for the Friends of Soviet Russia, a communist mass organization established to help raise funds for famine relief in Soviet Russia.

In 1931, he founded the Unemployed Citizens' League of Seattle, associated with Unemployed Cooperative Distribution Association (UCDA, southern California), Unemployed Cooperative Relief Association (UCRA, southern California), Unemployed Exchange Association (UXA, Oakland). In the early 1930s, he was an administrative assistant of Marion A. Zioncheck, a congressman representing Washington's 1st congressional district.

=== Death and legacy ===
Hulet Wells died February 15, 1970. He was 91 years old at the time of his death.

== Works ==
- A Wrong Without a Remedy. Seattle, WA: 1909. —Lost pamphlet.
- The Colonel and His Friends: A Suppressed Play: A Comedy in Three Acts. Prologue by Bruce Rogers. Seattle, WA: n.p., 1913.
- Wilson and the Issues of To-day: A Socialist Revision of George Creel's Famous Book. Seattle, WA: Socialist Party, 1918.
- I Wanted to Work. Unpublished manuscript, c. 1955. Housed in the Hulet M. Wells Papers, University of Washington Special Collections, box 2.
