= Elmer Allison =

American political activist and newspaper editor

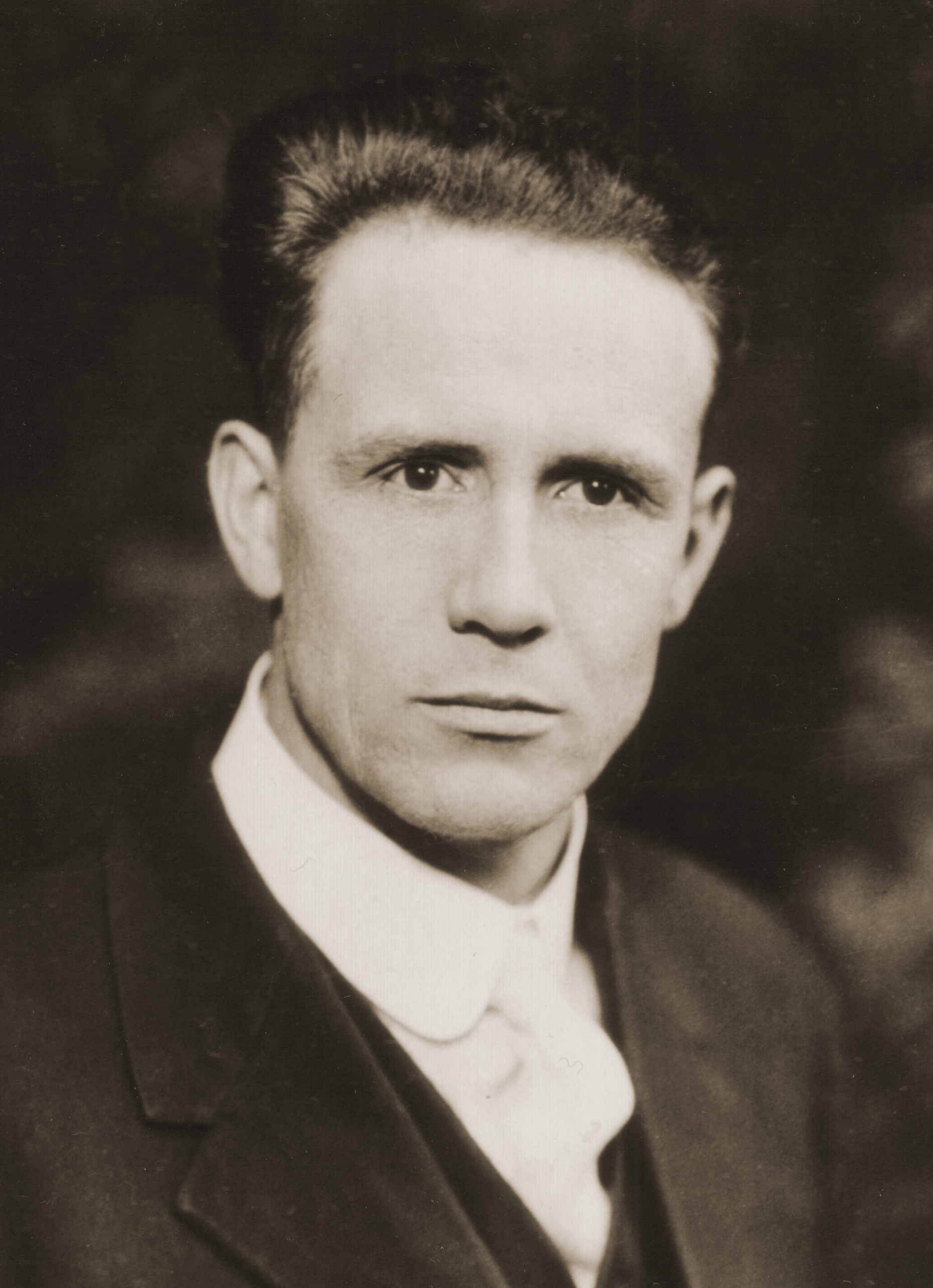
Elmer T. Allison was a founding member of the Communist Labor Party of America in 1919 and the editor of one of its official newspapers.

Elmer T. Allison (1883 – 1982) was an American socialist, political activist, and newspaper editor. He is best remembered as the longtime editor of The Cleveland Socialist and The Toiler, forerunners of the official organ of the Communist Party, USA, The Daily Worker.

== Biography ==
=== Early years ===
Elmer T. Allison was born December 5, 1883, in Houstonia, Missouri, the son of Nathaniel Allison and Mattie (Johnson) Allison. His education was mostly through self-instruction, having been pulled out of elementary school when he was in the 5th grade so that he could go to work to help support his family.

In 1899, the Allisons moved to Washington state where Elmer found employment as a shingle weaver, a millhand who created cedar roofing shingles by means of an automated saw — a very exhausting and extremely dangerous profession.

=== Political career ===
Allison joined the Socialist Party of America (SPA) in 1901, the year of its formation, and was active in the activities of its state affiliate, the Socialist Party of Washington. He was also a member of the Industrial Workers of the World (IWW) No. 500 after that revolutionary union emerged in 1905.

In 1905, Elmer's sister, Hortense Allison, married his friend and party comrade Alfred Wagenknecht, an active leader of the radical Pike Street Branch directed by newspaper publisher Hermon F. Titus. Elmer Allison and Alfred Wagenknecht would remain close political associates for the next two decades, which saw the formation of the American communist movement.

Together with Wagenknecht, Allison was briefly jailed in 1907 during the free speech fight between Seattle's Socialists and the city administration over the right to speak from soapboxes on public sidewalks.

Allison was elected the Secretary of the Local Seattle, Socialist Party in 1908. That same year, he married his first wife, the former Anna Theresa Swanson.

Together with the Wagenknechts, Allison moved to Cleveland, Ohio, in 1917, where he was chosen as editor of The Cleveland Socialist, the weekly newspaper published by Local Cuyahoga County. The name of this paper was later changed to The Toiler and this was made an official publication of the Communist Labor Party (CLP) when this group was formed in a split from the SPA in August 1919. Allison continued to fulfill the role of editor for this publication for some time, yielding the chief editorial post to James P. Cannon in August 1920 he arrived in Cleveland. The paper was moved to New York City in the fall of 1921, with Allison following in its tow. The Toiler was never an "illegal" publication, despite the forced move of the CLP into a shadowy secret existence due to ongoing raids by the U.S. Department of Justice during the first years of the 1920s.

In 1921, Allison was elected Secretary of the American Labor Alliance, headquartered in New York, an auxiliary of the underground Communist Party of America which advocated an open, legalized existence and participation in political campaigns.

Allison also worked as the Business Manager of The Toiler — the paper which he used to edit — from 1921. He continued in this role in 1922 when the paper changed its name to The Worker to emphasize its connection to the new "legal political party" of the American communist movement, the Workers Party of America (WPA). The group's founding convention, held in New York City in the first days of January 1922, elected Allison to the governing Central Executive Committee of the new organization.

In 1922, the divorced Allison married his second wife, the former Rose Rosen.

In October 1922, Allison was elected to the 7-member administrative council of the WPA, a body akin to an executive committee in many other organizations. He was not long in this capacity, however, as in 1923 he was made the business manager of the lyceum and literature department of the WPA.

Allison made at least one campaign for elective political office, running for New York State Senate in the 14th District on the ticket of the Workers (Communist) Party in 1926.

=== Later years ===
Allison moved from New York City to Danbury, Connecticut, in the early 1920s, where he lived for many years. He worked as a factory worker in Danbury into his 80s, when he finally retired.

After his retirement, Allison spent summers in a summer home he had constructed in Southbury, Connecticut, writing poetry which was published in a number of small Connecticut newspapers.

=== Death and legacy ===
Elmer Allison died July 18, 1982, in Olympia, Washington. He was 98 years old at the time of his death. His body was buried at Woodbine Cemetery in Puyallup, Washington.

== See also ==
- Socialist Party of Washington
