= Edwin J. Brown =

Seattle mayor; American politician and dentist

33rd Mayor of Seattle
- In office June 5, 1922 – June 7, 1926
- Preceded by: Hugh M. Caldwell
- Succeeded by: Bertha Knight Landes

Personal details
- Born: 1864 or 1865 Oregon, Illinois
- Died: July 28, 1941 (aged 76) Seattle, Washington
- Party: Socialist
- Education: Kansas City School of Law (1899)
- Occupation: Dentist, lawyer, politician

Edwin J. "Doc" Brown (1864–1941) was mayor of Seattle, elected in May, 1922, and again in 1924.

== Biography ==
Edwin J. Brown graduated from Kansas City School of Law in 1899, and worked as a dentist, thus earning the moniker "Doc" Brown. As a politician during prohibition, Brown personally did not drink alcohol, but supported the public's right to drink.

During the decade of the 1910s, Brown was a leader of the moderate wing of Local Seattle of the Socialist Party of Washington, state affiliate of the Socialist Party of America.

When Brown left to attend the 1924 Democratic National Convention, he appointed city council member Bertha Knight Landes as acting mayor. Landes began her own law and order campaign, firing Police Chief William B. Severyns for corruption and closing down lotteries, punchboards and speakeasies. Upon his return, Brown reinstated the police chief. In 1926, Brown ran for a third term, but lost to Landes.

He died on July 28, 1941, at the age of 76, of a heart attack.

== See also ==
- Anna A. Maley
- Socialist Party of Washington
- Wage Workers Party

== Works ==
- Edwin J. Brown, "Socialists in Public Office," Seattle Union Record, vol. 30, no. 4 (Feb. 7, 1914), p. 8.

Political offices
Preceded by Hugh M. Caldwell	Mayor of Seattle; 1922–1926	Succeeded by Bertha Knight Landes
