= Wage Workers Party =

Defunct political party in Washington State, USA

The Wage Workers Party was a short-lived split from the Socialist Party of Washington from 1909-1910.

== Organizational history ==
Division had been mounting between the regular organization, controlled by Edwin J. Brown, and the left opposition centered on Hermon F. Titus' Seattle Socialist. The "rights" were more electorally oriented while the "lefts" wanted to make the party a "fighting organization", and tried to give aid to the IWW. The faction fight became more acrimonious as the two groups began expelling each other from local branches. The issue was framed in terms of what social group would control the party: the rights were pictured as "petty-bourgeois" and supported by intellectuals, skilled workers and better off farmers while the left was supposedly more "proletarian" and supported by lumber workers, city laborers and poor farmers. Titus also had supporters in California, Oregon, Idaho, and Montana.

The divisions within the group came to a head at the Socialist state convention in Everett in early 1909. The lefts claimed that they had won a majority of delegates but that the rights had manipulated control of the party apparatus to give them a majority at the convention. Titus and his forces led a walk out and held their own convention, declaring themselves the true representatives of the Socialist Party of Washington. When the National Executive Committee of the Socialist Party came down in favor of the regular group, the Titus forces were in an anomalous situation. After flirting with the idea of going into the Socialist Labor Party, the Titus- led Socialist Party of Washington became the Wage Workers Party on February 25, 1910.

When the party was formed they made a constitutional provision banning petty-bourgeois elements from the organization, including "lawyers, preachers, doctors, dentists, detective, soldiers, factory owners, and shop keepers" from membership. Titus, who had been a doctor, gave up his profession and became an elevator operator. Joseph Biscay was elected secretary. Harry Ault, later to become a leader in the Seattle General Strike of 1919 was a member, as was William Z. Foster and his future son-in-law Joseph Manley.

The organization lasted a matter of months. It produced one issue of a newspaper, The Wage Worker. Titus' supporters in Oregon and California were confused about the situation and apparently never rallied to the new group. Most of the group's members drifted into the Industrial Workers of the World, while the core around Titus split between factions advocating a four and a three-hour day.
