= Mary Farquharson =

Washington State politician

Mary U. Farquharson
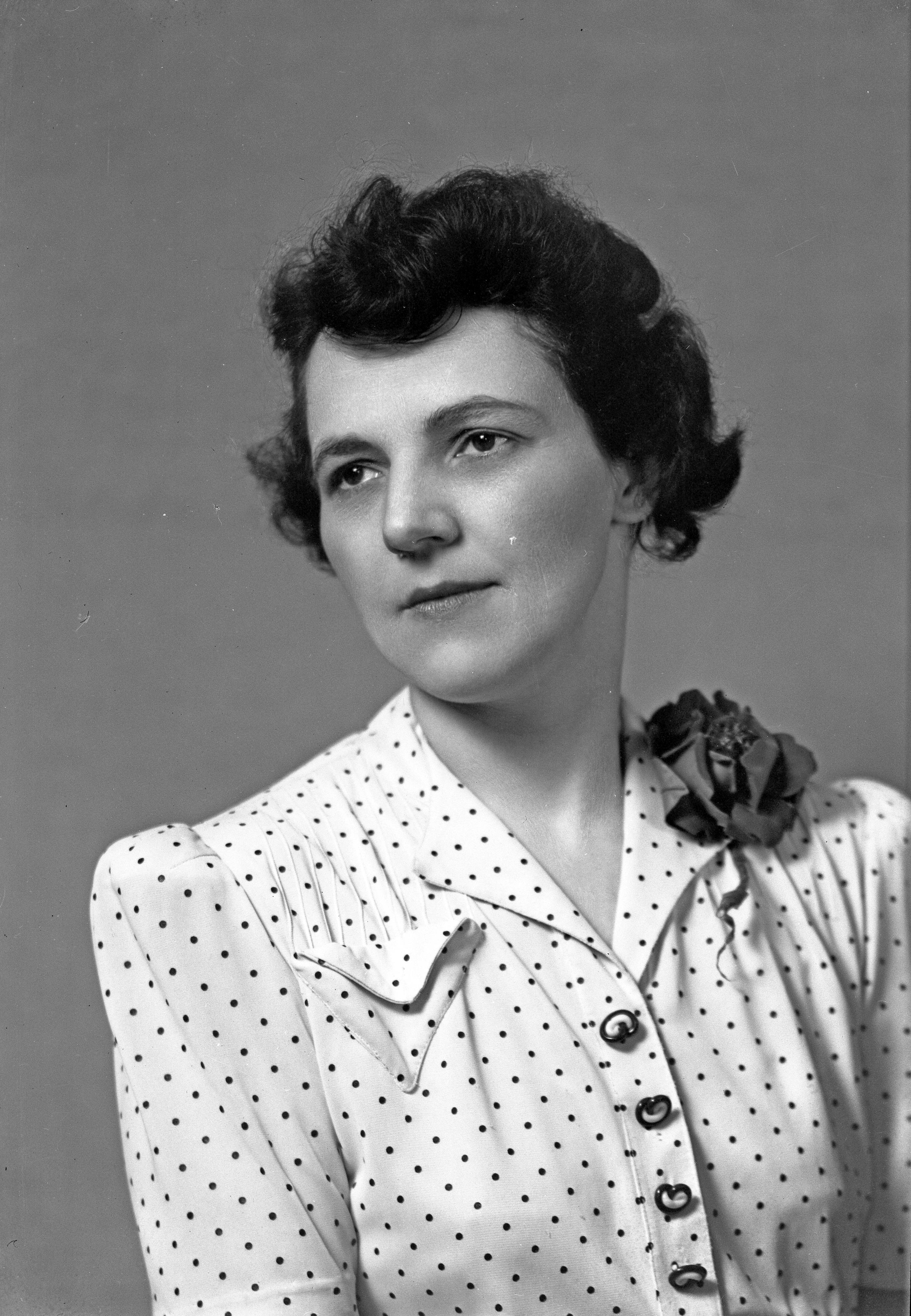
- Farquharson c. 1941

Member of the Washington Senate from the 46th district
- In office January 14, 1935 – January 11, 1943
- Preceded by: E. L. Howard
- Succeeded by: Dr. J. R. Binyon

Personal details
- Born: Mary U. Nichols; April 5, 1901 Tacoma, Washington, U.S.
- Died: September 1, 1982 (aged 81) Seattle, Washington, U.S.
- Party: Socialist (before 1934); Democratic (after 1934)
- Spouse: Burt Farquharson
- Education: University of Washington (B.A., English)
- Occupation: Teacher

Mary U. Farquharson (née Nichols; April 5, 1901 - September 1, 1982) was an American politician who served as a member of the Washington State Senate from 1935 to 1943. She represented Washington's 46th legislative district as a Democrat.

== Early life and education ==
Farquharson was born Mary U. Nichols in 1901 in Tacoma, Washington. In 1928, she married Frederick "Burt" Farquharson, a civil engineer and University of Washington engineering professor. Burt was critical in investigating the collapse of the Tacoma Narrows Bridge in 1940 and was the last person on the bridge before it collapsed.

She was originally a member of the Socialist Party. She and Burt founded the Washington Commonwealth Federation, a political pressure group founded in 1934 that functioned as an organized faction of the Washington State Democratic Party and came to be dominated by the Communist Party USA by the late 1930s. WCF dissolved in 1948, during the Second Red Scare.

== Political career ==
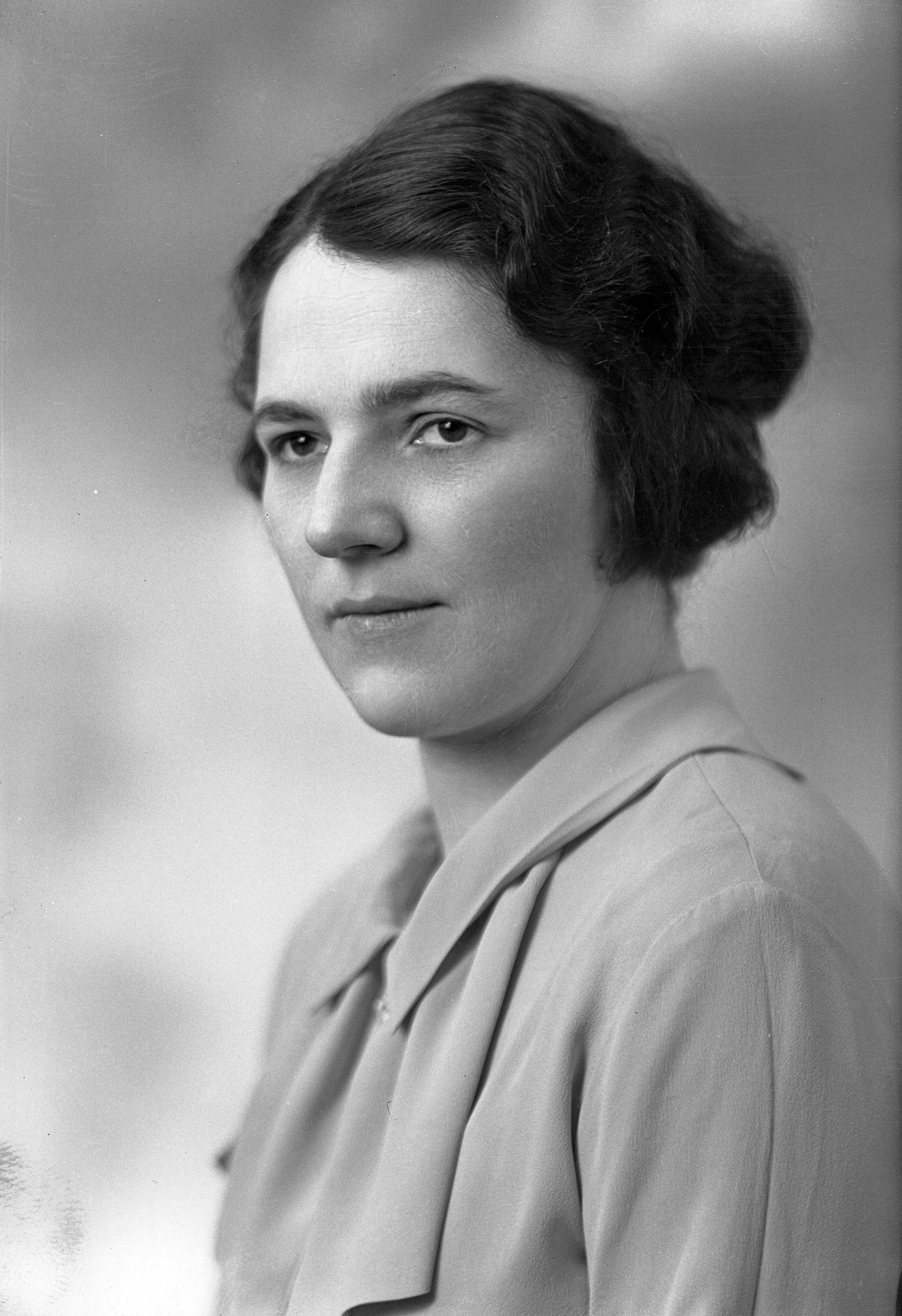
Farquharson's official State Senate portrait, 1935

Mary and Burt became active in liberal politics in 1930; both were active in the Fellowship of Reconciliation, an interfaith peach and justice organization.

In 1934, with encouragement from the Women's Legislative Council of Washington, she ran for and won a seat in the Washington State Senate, serving two terms from 1935 to 1943. Although she ran as a Democrat, she was previously a Socialist. Her first Senate campaign prominently featured Upton Sinclair's slogan "Production for use not for profit," embodying a central economic tenet for both evolutionary socialists and revolutionary Marxists in the movements' 19th-century origins.

In 1935, the year she joined the Legislature, she was also one of the founders of the ACLU's Seattle chapter.

With large Democratic majorities in both houses of the Legislature, Farquharson was able to have an immediate legislative impact even in her first term. She advanced a bill limiting working hours for domestic workers to 60 per week, bringing Eleanor Roosevelt to Seattle in support. Her legislative priorities also included seeking a progressive state income tax, funding education, advocating a unicameral legislature, and repealing Washington's criminal syndicalism law.

In 1939, she helped secure commutation of the sentence of Ray Becker, the last Industrial Workers of the World member incarcerated in relation to the Centralia Massacre, who had maintained his innocence for the intervening 20 years.

=== Opposition to internment of Japanese Americans ===
During World War II, she worked to help incarcerated Japanese Americans during their internment by the United States government. After the arrest of Gordon Hirabayashi for his open defiance of internment, Farquharson suggested that he make his case a test case, organized a support committee for Hirabayashi, and served as its secretary-treasurer as the committee raised funds for his legal defense. This support was important in advancing Hirabayashi's case all the way to decision by the U.S. Supreme Court, particularly as the ACLU refused to support Hirabayashi.

More broadly, her advocacy against mass internment included working in 1943 as one organizers of the Pacific Coast Committee on American Principles and Fair Play.

=== After the Legislature ===
In 1950, Farquharson ran once more for the state Senate, but lost in the primary. She and Burt remained politically active after the War, opposing capital punishment and nuclear proliferation until Burt's death in 1970.

== Death and legacy ==
When Farquharson died in 1982, twelve years after her husband, she left 90% of her estate to the Fellowship of Reconciliation.

== Affiliations ==
- Fellowship of Reconciliation
  - Northwest Regional Secretary before and during World War II
- Seattle Urban League
- Women's International League for Peace and Freedom
  - Delegate to 1946 Luxembourg Congress
- Women's Legislative Council
- University of Washington YMCA (board member)
