= From Bryan to Stalin =

1937 book by William Z. Foster

- Author: William Z. Foster
- Language: English
- Genre: Political Memoir
- Publication date: 1937
- Publication place: United States

From Bryan to Stalin is the first volume of political memoirs published by the American radical trade union organizer William Z. Foster (1881–1961). The book was written by Foster during his lengthy recuperation from a heart attack and mental breakdown suffered in 1932 and 1933. The book was published in 1937 by International Publishers, a Marxist publishing house closely associated with the Communist Party, USA, an organization for which Foster ran three times as candidate for President of the United States.

Foster's 352-page memoir has come to be regarded as an important historical source for students of early 20th Century syndicalism and communism in the United States, and has been extensively employed in the writing of several biographies of the author.

== Publication history ==
=== Background ===
American Communist Party leader William Z. Foster (1881–1961) suffered from a serious heart ailment ever since symptoms of angina pectoris began to first appear on the campaign trail in June 1932. An exhausting travel schedule that took him 30,000 miles and place him before more than 100 crowds—events which included arrests in Los Angeles and Lawrence, Massachusetts—exacerbated Foster's existing health condition.

On September 8, 1932, Foster collapsed from a severe heart attack in Moline, Illinois, which nearly claimed Foster's life. The crisis left Foster weak and bedridden, with only a telephone statement to a final Communist Party election rally at Madison Square Garden in New York City deemed possible during the final two months of the 1932 campaign. Foster found himself separated from politics for nearly a year, with political news and party newspapers kept away from him upon the advice of his physician.

Accompanying his heart ailment came a mental breakdown which further sapped Foster's energy and activity. In search of a cure, in the summer of 1933 Foster traveled to the Soviet Union, where he was placed in a series of three different health care facilities, with his mental state only deteriorating further, with his daughter bringing him home to the US in January 1934. Again on the advice of his doctor, Foster was moved out of the Communist Party hub of New York City, this time to the home of a relative in comparatively placid San Francisco, California, located on the opposite coast.

Foster remained ill, physically and mentally, until late in 1935, when a return to active political life was finally made. It was during this long recuperation process in 1934 and 1935 that Foster began work on his autobiography, an effort that was ultimately published in two volumes as From Bryan to Stalin (1937) and Pages from a Worker's Life (1939).

=== Release ===
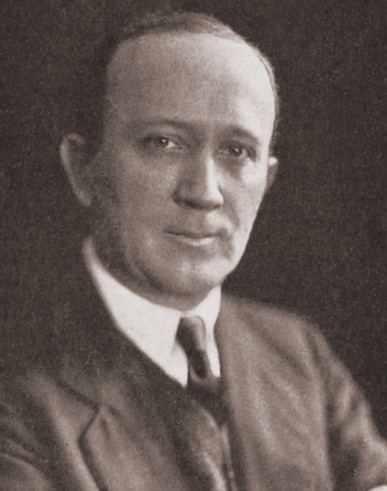
Portrait of American Communist trade union leader William Z. Foster

From Bryan to Stalin was released in the spring of 1937 by International Publishers, a New York City-based publishing house closely tied to the Communist Party, USA. The book did not cross over to achieve mainstream publishing success, but was restricted instead to a relatively limited circulation among radical political activists.

=== Contents ===
Calling Foster "the most important figure in the American Communist Party," Brooklyn Daily Eagle reviewer John Barbash noted that From Bryan to Stalin was effectively composed of "two distinct parts"—the first dealing with Foster's trade union and political activities prior to his joining the Communist Party of America in 1921 and the second dealing with his various activities as an active participant in the American Communist movement. The first part of the tale, Barbash indicates, related to Foster's early acceptance of the strategy of dual unionism—the establishment of radical rival unions to already-existing unions with a conservative, business-friendly orientation—and his growing realization of the "dangerous character" of such a plan and embrace of the alternative tactic of "boring from within" conservative unions to radicalize them.

After joining the Communist movement, Foster's emphasis becomes one of detailing the "boring from within" process as practiced by the Trade Union Educational League which he headed, Barbash notes. Barbash is critical of the way that Foster failed to acknowledge the success of Samuel Gompers in establishing trade unions capable of withstanding the pressures of economic depression and his tendency to vilify his opponents as practitioners of "deliberate deception," calling them "ultra-reactionary, misleaders, and betrayers." He also upbraids Foster for an inability or unwillingness to admit error in explaining various tactical reversals of the Communists, which were transformed from support of third party Presidential politics in 1924 to a strategy of "defeating Landon at all costs" in the election of 1936.

Barbash lauds Foster's account of the history of American syndicalism in the years before World War I but charges him with proffering an "essentially unreliable" treatment of the labor movement in the post-war years.

=== Critical reaction ===
Foster's memoir was seen by the Communist Party as a tool connecting the history of the early 20th Century American trade union movement to the history of the party itself. This relationship was emphasized by CPUSA leader Elizabeth Gurley Flynn, who in her review of From Bryan to Stalin in The New Masses hailed Foster's work the "broad, factual, and impersonal story" of "an American worker and the forces which led him to revolutionary conclusions and finally to the Communist Party."

The conservative British magazine The Spectator was more sanguine in its appraisal, criticizing Foster's "account of the transformation of the too exotic, too doctrinaire party of zealots into the present officially truly American party that has Moscow's blessing is too brief to be more than a whet to the appetite" while noting that "a great deal of his book...will be unintelligible to the reader who has not the general outlines of recent American labour history clearly in his head. While Foster "could have written an autobiography of great interest and real value," the unsigned reviewer asserted that instead Foster was "content to intermingle scraps of his own story with an account of the American labour movement beginning with the great upheavals of the 'nineties and passing through the heyday of the Industrial Workers of the World to the rise of orthodox communism," intimating that such a decision was less than satisfactory.

Foster himself regarded From Bryan to Stalin and its successor volume, Pages from a Worker's Life, as an exercise in Communist Party history writing, both as a "contribution to the history of left wing trade unionism in the United States during the past forty years" and as a semi-official history of the origins of the party itself. In the estimation of historian and Foster biographer James R. Barrett, the books remained as such until Foster's publication of a formal History of the Communist Party of the United States of America in 1952, which effectively superseded the earlier autobiographical effort.

== Chapter list ==
1. Beginnings
2. Bryan Movement
3. Socialist Party
4. Wage Workers Party
5. Industrial Workers of the World
6. Syndicalist League of North America
7. International Trade Union Educational League
8. AF of L: The Meat Packing Campaign
9. AF of L: The Steel Campaign
10. Red International of Labor Unions
11. Communist International
12–13. Trade Union Educational League
14–15. Trade Union Unity League
16. Communist Party
17. The Road Ahead
