= Bibliography on American Communism =

For the main article to which this is linked see Communist Party USA.
For an annotated list of publications published by the Communist Party USA, see List of Communist publications.

The following is a bibliography on American Communism, listing some of the most important works on the topic.

== Bibliography ==
=== General articles ===
- Bittelman, Alexander. "Outline for a History of the Communist Party in America. (circa 1923)" (PDF). Archived from the original (PDF) on 2009-03-25. (126 KiB). Published as “Hynes Exhibit No. 4” in Report of the Special Committee to Investigate Communist Activities. (Washington, DC: Government Printing Office, 1930), pp. 435–448. Published on line by http://www.marxisthistory.org. Retrieved June 11, 2006.
- Nash, Michael. "Communist History at the Tamiment Library" (PDF). (4.22 MiB). American Communist History, Vol. 3, No. 2, 2004. Retrieved April 3, 2006.

=== General histories ===
- Buhle, Paul, Marxism in the USA: Remapping the History of the American Left. London: Verso, 1987.
- Cannon, James P., The First Ten Years of American Communism: Report of a Participant. New York: Lyle Stuart, 1962.
- Dobbs, Farrell, Marxist Leadership in the U.S.: Revolutionary Continuity: Birth of the Communist Movement, 1918-1922. New York: Monad Press, 1983.
- Draper, Theodore, The Roots of American Communism. New York: Viking, 1957.
- Draper, Theodore, American Communism and Soviet Russia: The Formative Period. New York: Viking, 1960.
- Foster, William Z., History of the Communist Party of the United States. New York: International Publishers, 1952.
- Howe, Irving and Lewis Coser, The American Communist Party: A Critical History. Boston: Beacon Press, 1957.
- Isserman, Maurice, Which Side Were You On?: The American Communist Party During the Second World War. Wesleyan University Press, 1982 and 1987.
- Jaffe, Philip J., Rise and Fall of American Communism. Horizon Press, 1975.
- Klehr, Harvey. The Heyday of American Communism:The Depression Decade, Basic Books, 1984.
- Klehr, Harvey and Haynes, John Earl, The American Communist Movement: Storming Heaven Itself, Twayne Publishers (Macmillan), 1992.
- Klehr, Harvey, John Earl Haynes, and Fridrikh Igorevich Firsov. The Secret World of American Communism. New Haven: Yale University Press, 1995.
- Klehr, Harvey, Kyrill M. Anderson, and John Earl Haynes. The Soviet World of American Communism. New Haven: Yale University Press, 1998.
- Lewy, Guenter, The Cause That Failed: Communism in American Political Life. New York: Oxford University Press, 1997.
- Oneal, James, American Communism: A Critical Analysis of Its Origins, Development, and Programs. New York: Rand Book Store, 1927. Revised ed. 1948.
- Ottanelli, Fraser M., The Communist Party of the United States: From the Depression to World War II. New Brunswick, NJ: Rutgers University Press, 1991.
- Palmer, Bryan, James P. Cannon and the Origins of the American Revolutionary Left, 1890-1928. Urbana, IL: Illinois University Press, 2007.
- Richmond, Al, A Long View from the Left: Memoirs of an American Revolutionary. 447 pages, Houghton Mifflin, 1973.
- Shannon, David A., The Decline of American Communism: A History of the Communist Party of the United States since 1945. New York: Harcourt, Brace and Co., 1959.
- Starobin, Joseph R., American Communism in Crisis, 1943-1957. Cambridge, MA: Harvard University Press, 1972.
- Stevenson, Archibald (ed.), Revolutionary Radicalism: Its History, Purpose and Tactics...Being the Report of the Joint Legislative Committee Investigating Seditious Activities, Filed April 24, 1920, in the Senate of the State of New York: Part 1: Revolutionary and Subversive Movements Abroad and at Home. In Two Volumes. (AKA the "Lusk Report.") Albany, NY: J.B. Lyon, 1920.
- Jacob A. Zumoff, "The Communist International and US Communism, 1919-1929." Leiden: Brill, 2014.

=== Regional and local histories ===
- Holmes, T. Michael, The Specter of Communism in Hawaii. Honolulu: University of Hawaii Press, 1994.
- Kelley, Robin D. G., Hammer and Hoe: Alabama Communists During the Great Depression. University of North Carolina Press, 1990.
- Lyons, Paul, Philadelphia Communists, 1936-1956. Philadelphia: Temple University Press, 1982
- Pedersen, Vernon L., The Communist Party in Maryland. Urbana, IL: University of Illinois Press, 2001.
- Storch, Randi, Red Chicago: American Communism at Its Grassroots, 1928-35. Urbana, IL: University of Illinois Press, 2007.

=== Social composition of the Communist movement ===
- Glazer, Nathan, The Social Basis of American Communism. New York: Harcourt, Brace and World, 1961.
- Klehr, Harvey E., Communist Cadre: The Social Background of the American Communist Party, Hoover Institution Press, 1960, ISBN 0-685-67279-4
- Kraditor, Aileen S., Jimmy Higgins: The Mental World of the American Rank-And-File Communist, 1930-1958. Westport, CT: Greenwood Publishing Company, 1988. ISBN 0-313-26246-2

=== Participant memoirs ===
- Bailey, Bill, The Kid From Hoboken: An Autobiography. San Francisco: Circus Lithograph Press, 1993.
- Chambers, Whittaker, Witness. New York: Random House, 1952.
- Eastman, Max, Love and Revolution: My Journey Through an Epoch. New York: Random House, 1964.
- Foster, William Z., From Bryan to Stalin. New York: International Publishers, 1937.
- Foster, William Z., Pages from a Worker's Life. New York: International Publishers, 1939.
- Freeman, Joseph, An American Testament: A Narrative of Rebels and Romantics. New York: Farrar and Rinehart, 1936.
- Gates, John, The Story of An American Communist. New York: Thomas Nelson and Sons, 1958.
- Gitlow, Benjamin, I Confess: The Truth About American Communism. New York: E.P. Dutton, 1940.
- Gitlow, Benjamin, Witness. New York: Random House, 1952.
- Gornick, Vivian, The Romance of American Communism., New York: Basic Books, 1977.
- Healey, Dorothy and Isserman, Maurice, Dorothy Healey Remembers: A Life in the American Communist Party. New York: Oxford University Press, 1990.
- Mitford, Jessica, A Fine Old Conflict. New York: Vintage Books USA, 1977.
- Nelson, Steve, Barrett, James R., and Ruck, Rob, Steve Nelson: American Radical. Pittsburgh: University of Pittsburgh Press, 1981.
- Scriber, Tom, Lumberjack. Santa Cruz, CA: Redwood Ripsaw, 1966.
- Shipman, Charles, It Had to Be Revolution: Memoirs of an American Radical. Ithaca, NY: Cornell University Press, 1993.
- Richmond, Al, A Long View from the Left: Memoirs of an American Revolutionary. Boston: Houghton Mifflin, 1973.
- Schrank, Robert, Wasn't That a Time? Growing Up Radical and Red in America. Cambridge, MA: MIT Press, 1998.
- Williamson, John, Dangerous Scot: The Life and Work of an American "Undesirable." New York: International Publishers, 1969.
- Wolfe, Bertram D., A Life in Two Centuries: An Autobiography. New York: Stein and Day, 1981.
- Wolfe, Bertram D., Strange Communists I Have Known. New York: Stein and Day, 1965.

=== Biographies of leading participants ===
- Barrett, James R., William Z. Foster and the Tragedy of American Radicalism. Urbana, IL: University of Illinois Press, 1999.
- Buhle, Paul M., A Dreamer's Paradise Lost: Louis C. Fraina/Lewis Corey (1892–1953) and the Decline of Radicalism in the United States. Atlantic Highlands, NJ: Humanities Press International, 1995.
- Camp, Helen C., Iron in Her Soul: Elizabeth Gurley Flynn and the American Left. Pullman, WA: Washington State University Press, 1995.
- Johanningsmeier, Edward P., Forging American Communism: The Life of William Z. Foster. Princeton, NJ: Princeton University Press, 1994.
- Johnson, Oakley C., The Day is Coming: Life and Work of Charles E. Ruthenberg. New York: International Publishers, 1957.
- Morgan, Ted, A Covert Life: Jay Lovestone: Communist, Anti-Communist, and Spymaster. New York: Random House, 1999.
- O'Neill, William L., The Last Romantic: A Life of Max Eastman. New York: Oxford University Press, 1978.
- Hicks, Granville with Stuart, John, John Reed: The Making of a Revolutionary. New York: Macmillan, 1936.
- Ryan, James G. (1997), Earl Browder: The Failure of American Communism., University of Alabama Press, ISBN 0-8173-0843-1
- Shields, Art, On the Battle Lines, 1919-1939. New York: International Publishers, 1986.
- Strong, Tracy B. and Keyssar, Helene, Right in Her Soul: The Life of Anna Louise Strong. New York: Random House, 1983.
- Young, Art, Art Young—His Life and Times. New York: Sheridan House, 1939.
- Zipser, Arthur and Zipser, Pearl, Fire and Grace: The Life of Rose Pastor Stokes. Athens, GA: University of Georgia Press, 1989.

=== The Communist Party and the trade unions ===
- Bimba, Anthony, History of the American Working Class. New York: International Publishers, 1927.
- Cochran, Bert, Labor and Communism: The Conflict That Shaped American Unions, Princeton University Press, 1977, ISBN 0-691-04644-1
- Foner, Philip S., History of the Labor Movement in the United States. (In 10 Volumes) New York: International Publishers, 1948-1994.
- Freeman, Joshua B. In Transit: The Transport Workers Union in New York City, 1933-1966.

Philadelphia: Temple University Press, 2001. ISBN 1-56639-922-X

- Gibson, Rich, "The Torment and Demise of the United Auto Workers' Union." https://web.archive.org/web/20121029191136/http://clogic.eserver.org/2006/gibson.html
- Kampelman, Max M., Communist Party vs the CIO: A Study in Power Politics. New York: Frederick A. Praeger, 1957.
- Keeran, Roger, Communist Party and the Auto Workers Unions. Bloomington, IN: Indiana University Press, 1980. ISBN 0-253-15754-4
- Levenstein, Harvey, Communism, Anticommunism, and the CIO. Westport, CT: Greenwood Press, 1981. ISBN 0-313-22072-7
- Salmond, John A., Gastonia 1929: The Story of the Loray Mill Strike. Chapel Hill, NC: University of North Carolina Press, 1995. ISBN 0-8078-2237-X
- Saposs, David J., Left Wing Unionism: A Study of Radical Policies and Tactics. New York: International Publishers, 1926.
- Schatz, Ronald W. Electrical Workers: A History of Labor at General Electric and Westinghouse, 1923-60. Urbana, IL: University of Illinois Press, 1983. ISBN 0-252-01031-0
- Schneider, David M., The Workers' (Communist) Party and American Trade Unions. Baltimore: Johns Hopkins Press, 1928.

=== The Communist Party and agriculture ===
- Daniel, Cletus E. Bitter Harvest: A History of California Farmworkers, 1870-1941. Ithaca, NY: Cornell University Press, 1981; paper: Berkeley, CA: University of California Press, 1982.
- Dyson, Lowell K., Red Harvest: The Communist Party and American Farmers, University of Nebraska Press, 1982. ISBN 0-8032-1659-9
- Kelley, Robin D.G. Hammer and Hoe: Alabama Communists During the Great Depression. Chapel Hill, NC: University of North Carolina Press, 1990. ISBN 0-8078-4288-5

=== The Communist Party and youth ===
- Cohen, Robert, When the Old Left Was Young: Student Radicals and America's First Mass Student Movement, 1929-1941. New York: Oxford University Press, 1993.
- Mishler, Paul C., Raising Reds: The Young Pioneers, Radical Summer Camps, and Communist Political Culture in the United States. New York: Columbia University Press, 1999.

=== The Communist Party and women ===
- Slutsky, Beth. Gendering Radicalism: Women and Communism in Twentieth-Century California. Lincoln, NE: University of Nebraska Press, 2015.
- Weigand, Kate. Red Feminism: American Communism and the Making of Women's Liberation. Baltimore: Johns Hopkins University Press, 2001.

=== The Communist Party and intellectuals ===
- Aaron, Daniel, Writers on the Left: Episodes in American Literary Communism. New York: Harcourt Brace & World, 1959.
- Horne, Gerald, Class Struggle in Hollywood, 1930-1950. Austin: University of Texas, 0292731388
- Schwartz, Lawrence H. Marxism and Culture: The CPUSA and Aesthetics in the 1930s, Authors Choice Press, 2000. ISBN 0-595-12751-7
- Wald, Alan Exiles from a Future Time: The Forging of the Mid-Twentieth Century Literary Left. Chapel Hill, NC: University of North Carolina Press, 2002. ISBN 0-8078-5349-6

=== The Communist Party and Black Americans ===
- Carter, Dan T. Scottsboro a Tragedy of the American South. New York: Oxford University Press, 1972; paper: Baton Rouge, LA: Louisiana State University Press, 1979.
- DuBois, W.E.B., The Autobiography of W. E. B. Du Bois. New York: International Publishers. ISBN 0-7178-0234-5
- Foner, Philip S., Organized Labor and the Black Worker. New York: International Publishers. ISBN 0-7178-0594-8
- Foner, Philip S. and Allen, James S. (eds.), American Communism and Black Americans: A Documentary History, 1919-1929. Philadelphia: Temple University Press, 1987.
- Foner, Philip S. and Shapiro, Herbert (eds.), American Communism and Black Americans: A Documentary History, 1930-1934. Philadelphia: Temple University Press, 1991. ISBN 0-87722-761-6
- Haywood, Harry, Black Bolshevik: Autobiography of an Afro-American Communist. Chicago: Liberator Press, 1978. ISBN 0-930720-53-9
- Martin, Charles H. The Angelo Herndon Case and Southern Justice. Baton Rouge, LA: Louisiana State University Press, 1976. ISBN 0-8071-0174-5
- Naison, Mark, Communists in Harlem During the Depression. Urbana, IL: University of Illinois Press, 1983. ISBN 0-252-00644-5
- Painter, Nell Irvin. The Narrative of Hosea Hudson: His Life as a Negro Communist in the South. Cambridge: Harvard University Press, 1979. ISBN 0-674-60110-6
- Pintzuk, Edward C. Reds, Racial Justice, and Civil Liberties: Michigan Communists During the Cold War. MEP Publications, 1997. ISBN 0-930656-71-7
- Record, Wilson, The Negro and the Communist Party. Chapel Hill, NC: University of North Carolina Press, 1951.
- Solomon, Mark, The Cry Was Unity: Communists and African Americans, 1917-1936. Jackson, MS: University of Mississippi Press, 1998. ISBN 1-57806-095-8
- Yates, James, Mississippi to Madrid: Memoir of a Black American in the Abraham Lincoln Brigade. Open Hand Publishing, 1989. ISBN 0-940880-20-2
- Zumoff, Jacob A. The Communist International and US Communism, 1919-1929. Leiden: Brill, 2014. Especially chapters 14-17.

=== The Communist Party and ethnic radicalism ===
- Bengston, Henry, On the Left in America: Memoirs of the Scandinavian-American Labor Movement. [1955] Kermit B. Westerbrook, trans. Carbondale, IL: Southern Illinois University Press, 1999.
- Buhle, Paul, and Georgakas, Dan (eds.), The Immigrant Left in the United States. Albany, NY: State University of New York Press, 1996.
- Epstein, Melech, The Jew and Communism, 1919-1941. New York: Trade Union Sponsoring Committee, n.d. [1959].
- Karni, Michael G. and Ollila Jr., Douglas J., For the Common Good: Finnish Immigrants and hithe United States: The Case of Finns and the Left. Rutherford, NJ: Farleigh Dickinson University Press, 1984.
- Kostiainen, Auvo, The Forging of Finnish-American Communism, 1917-1924: A Study in Ethnic Radicalism. Turku, Finland: University of Turku, Turku, Finland, 1978.
- Rosenblum, Gerald, Immigrant Workers: Their Impact on American Labor Radicalism. New York: Basic Books, 1973.
- Sherman, John W., A Communist Front at Mid-Century: The American Committee for Protection of Foreign Born, 1933-1959. Westport, CT: Praeger, 2001.
- Szajkowski, Zosa, Jews, Wars and Communism: Vol. 1: The Attitude of American Jews to World War I, the Russian Revolutions of 1917, and Communism (1914–1945). New York: Ktav, 1972.

=== Miscellaneous monographs related to the CPUSA ===
- Morray, J.P., Project Kuzbas: American Workers in Siberia (1921–1926). New York: International Publishers, 1983.
- Mullen, Bill V., Popular Fronts. Urbana, IL: University of Illinois Press, 1999. ISBN 0-252-06748-7
- Rosenstone, Robert, Crusade on the Left: The Lincoln Battalion in the Spanish Civil War. Pegasus, 1969.
- Saxton, Alexander, The Great Midland. Urbana, IL: University of Illinois Press, 1997.

=== Intra-party opposition movements ===
- Alexander, Robert J., The Right Opposition: The Lovestoneites and the International Communist Opposition of the 1930s. Westport, CT: Greenwood Press, 1981. ISBN 0-313-22070-0
- Cannon, James P., The History of American Trotskyism: Report of a Participant. New York: Pioneer Publishers, 1944.
- Myers, Constance Ashton, The Prophet's Army: Trotskyists in America, 1928-1941. Westport, CT: Greenwood Press, 1977. ISBN 0-8371-9030-4

=== Organized anti-communism and McCarthyism ===
- Ceplair, Larry and Englund, Steven, Inquisition in Hollywood: Politics in the Film Community, 1930-1960. New York: Doubleday, 1980. paper: Urbana, IL: University of Illinois Press, 2003.
- Fried, Richard M., Nightmare in Red: The McCarthy Era in Perspective. New York: Oxford University Press, 1991.
- Hoover, J. Edgar, Masters of Deceit: The Story of Communism in America and How to Fight It. New York: Henry Holt and Co., 1958.
- Jaffe, Julian F., Crusade Against Radicalism: New York During the Red Scare, 1914-1924. Port Washington, NY: Kennikat Press, 1972.
- Kornweibel Jr., Theodore, "Seeing Red": Federal Campaigns Against Black Militancy, 1919-1925. Bloomington, IN: Indiana University Press, 1998. ISBN 0-253-33337-7
- McCormick, Charles H., Seeing Reds: Federal Surveillance of Radicals in the Pittsburgh Mill District, 1917-1921. Pittsburgh: University of Pittsburgh Press, 1995.
- Murray, Robert K., Red Scare: A Study in National Hysteria, 1919-1920. Minneapolis: University of Minnesota Press, 1955.
- Oshinsky, David M. A Conspiracy So Immense: The World of Joe McCarthy. New York: Simon and Schuster, 1985.
- Preston Jr., William, Aliens and Dissenters: Federal Suppression of Radicals, 1903-1933. Cambridge, MA: Harvard University Press, 1963.
- Reeves, Thomas C., Life and Times of Joe McCarthy. New York: Stein & Day, 1983. ISBN 0-8128-2337-0
- Jacob Spolansky (1951). The Communist Trail in America. Macmillan.

=== Espionage, infiltration, and Soviet funding ===
- Andrew, Christopher and Mitrokhin, Vasili, The Sword and the Shield: The Mitrokhin Archive and the Secret History of the KGB, New York: Basic Books, 1999. ISBN 0-465-00310-9.
- John Barron, Operation Solo: The FBI's Man in the Kremlin. Chicago: Regnery Publishing, 1996; 2nd ed.: 2001, ISBN 0-7091-6061-5.
- Haynes, John Earl, and Klehr, Harvey, Venona: Decoding Soviet Espionage in America. New Haven, CT: Yale University Press, 2000.
- Meeropol, Robert, An Execution in the Family. New York: St. Martin's Press, 2003.
- Latham, Earl, Communist Controversy in Washington: From the New Deal to McCarthy, Holiday House, 1972.
- Radosh, Ronald and Joyce Milton, The Rosenberg File: A Search for the Truth. New York: Henry Holt, 1983. 2nd edition: New Haven, CT: Yale UP, 1997.
- Schecter, Jerrold and Leona, Sacred Secrets: How Soviet Intelligence Operations Changed American History, Potomac Books, 2002.
- Sudoplatov, Pavel Anatoli, Schecter, Jerrold L., and Schecter, Leona P., Special Tasks: The Memoirs of an Unwanted Witness—A Soviet Spymaster. Boston: Little Brown, 1994.
- Weinstein, Allen, Perjury: The Hiss–Chambers Case. New York: Knopf, 1978.
- Weinstein, Allen, and Vassiliev, Alexander, The Haunted Wood: Soviet Espionage in America - the Stalin Era. New York: Random House, 1999.
- Moynihan Commission on Government Secrecy Report, Appendix A, 4. The Encounter with Communism (1997)
- Office of the National Counterintelligence Executive. American Revolution into the New Millennium: A Counterintelligence Reader: "Cold War Counterintelligence". Archived from the original (PDF) on 2006-03-20.. Volume 3, Chapter 1. U.S. Government on line publication. No date. Retrieved May 25, 2005.

=== Bibliography ===
- John Earl Haynes, Communism and Anti-Communism in the United States: An Annotated Guide to Historical Writings. New York: Garland, 1987. ISBN 0-8240-8520-5
- Legislative Reference Service, Library of Congress. World Communism: A Selected Annotated Bibliography. “Chapter IV: Communism in the United States”. Harrisburg, PA: Department of Public Instruction, 1958.
- American Communist History semi-annual journal of the Historians of American Communism.

=== Historiography ===
- Isserman, Maurice, "The New History of American Communism Revisited." Reviews in American History, 20. 1992. 536 - 542. Johns Hopkins University Press.

=== Other References ===
- Roberts, Geoffrey (2006), Stalin's Wars: From World War to Cold War, 1939–1953, Yale University Press, ISBN 0-300-11204-1
