= Toward Soviet America =

1932 book by William Z. Foster

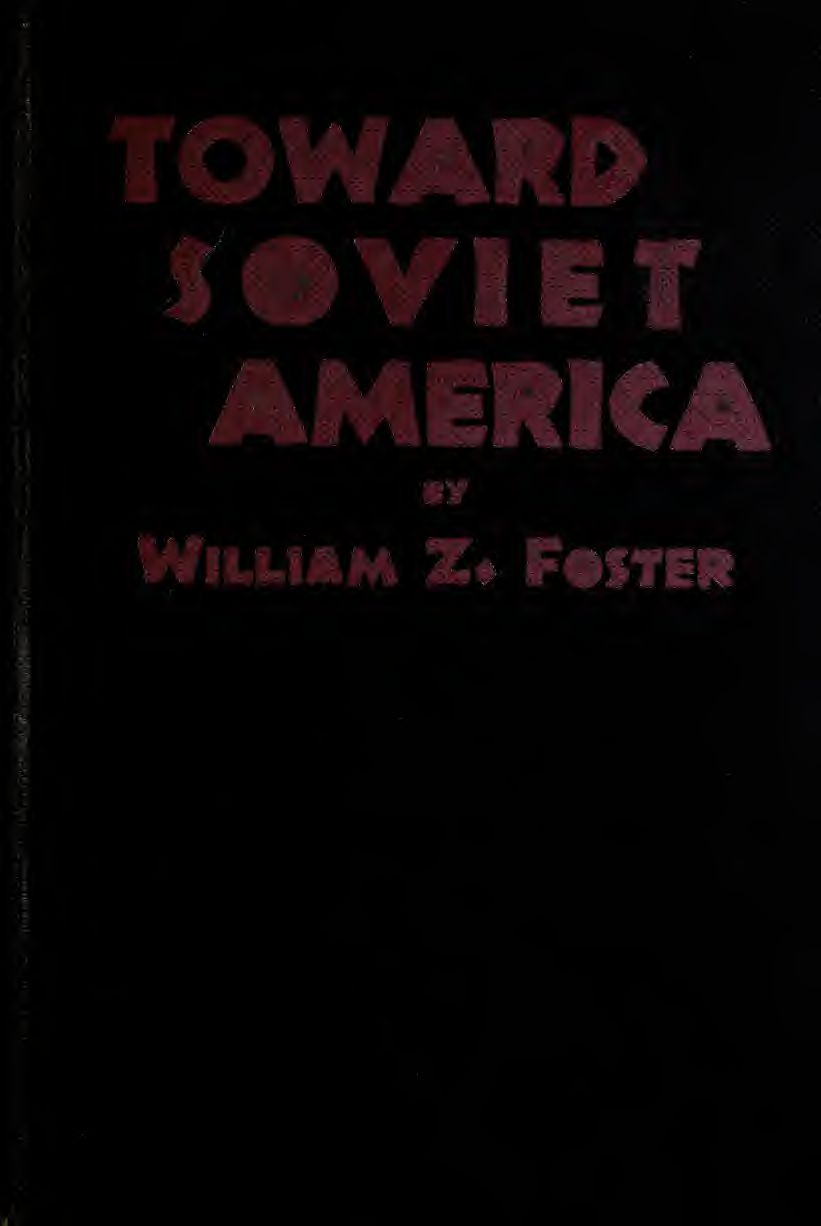
- Cover of the first edition, 1932
- Author: William Z. Foster
- Language: American English
- Genre: Political theory
- Publisher: Coward-McCann Inc.
- Publication date: 1932
- Publication place: United States
- Media type: Print
- Pages: 343
- OCLC: 1482151757

Toward Soviet America is a book written by American Communist leader William Z. Foster in 1932.

Foster described it in its preface as a "plain statement of Communist policy, avoiding technical complexities and theoretical elaboration" [...] "Its central purpose is to explain to the oppressed and exploited masses of workers and poor farmers how, under the leadership of the Communist party, they can best protect themselves now, and in due season cut their way out of the capitalist jungle to Socialism."

Chapter 1 describes the Great Depression as a crisis of capitalism and symptom of its decay, chapter 2 glowingly describes the economic and cultural development of the Soviet Union, chapter 3 criticizes efforts to reform the capitalist system, while chapters 4 and 5 describe the policies proposed by the Communist Party and aspects of life in a future "United Soviet States of America."

The work reflects the positions of the Communist Party USA during the Third Period, such as referring to the "social fascism" of the Socialist Party. In 1949 Foster wrote "I have long since criticized 'Toward Soviet America' on the grounds—first, that it contains many incorrect formulations, and second, that the book in general no longer corresponds to the present political situation and to our policies. We do not circulate this and other outdated and often unsatisfactorily written American books, pamphlets, and articles on Communism."

Despite this disavowal, the book was reprinted in 1961 by the House Un-American Activities Committee, with the claim that it continued to represent the outlook and goals of the Communist Party USA.
