= Trade Union Unity League =

Former trade union of the United States

- Abbreviation: TUUL
- Founders: William Z. Foster
- Founded: 1929; 97 years ago
- Dissolved: 1935; 91 years ago
- Preceded by: Trade Union Educational League
- Ideology: Dual unionism
- Political position: Far-left
- National affiliation: Communist Party of the United States
- International affiliation: Profintern

The Trade Union Unity League (TUUL) was an industrial union umbrella organization under the Communist Party of the United States (CPUSA) between 1929 and 1935. The group was an American affiliate of the Red International of Labor Unions. The formation of the TUUL was the result of the Communist International's Third Period policy, which ordered affiliated Communist Parties to pursue a strategy of dual unionism and thus abandon attempts at "bore from within" existing trade unions. TUUL unions aimed to organize semi-skilled and unskilled workers, many whom had been expelled from the American Federation of Labor (AFL). According to the TUUL, the AFL was "an instrument of the capitalists for the exploitation of the workers." Thus, the TUUL was formed as an organization in opposition to the AFL."

== History ==
=== Background ===
The Trade Union Unity League had its roots in an earlier Communist Party foray into the trade union movement, the Trade Union Educational League (1920-1929), headed by William Z. Foster. This earlier organization sought to pursue a "boring from within" tactic inside the previously existing unions, inside and outside of the American Federation of Labor — seeking to organize left wing "militants" within these unions with a view to transforming the unions themselves into revolutionary instruments. The TUEL sought to build a democratic, industrial, rank and file-centered union movement by attempting to steer conservative AFL and independent unions to the left on the political spectrum.

Despite his lifelong enmity towards dual unionism, Foster remained at the helm of the TUEL organization when it changed its name and tactics at its 1929 convention. This change of line was externally driven, Foster explained to his associate from the United Mine Workers of America, Powers Hapgood at the time of the change, declaring "Powers, the Communist Party decided that policy. As a good Communist I just have to go along."

=== Formation ===
The TUUL was founded at a convention held in Cleveland, Ohio, on August 31, 1929. The TUUL emerged out the Trade Union Education League (TUEL), which was founded by William Zebulon Foster in 1920. The TUEL attempted to create an "amalgamation of the trade unions" by forging alliances, organizing unity conferences, winning control of different local unions as well as city and state labor federations. The TUEL aimed to provide leadership for numerous local, as well as regional, industry-wide strikes. In 1928, the Communist International finally encouraged League members to abandon their "boring from within" strategy. In 1929, the TUEL gave way to the Trade Union Unity League (TUUL) and began to establish new unions. The TUUL founded about a dozen industrial unions in various economic sectors including textiles, marine labor, mining, shoe and leather manufacturing, and agricultural labor. Soon after the founding of the TUUL, approximately 50, 000 workers were organized by TUUL affiliates.

This period in the Party's history has been called its "hey day" and is notable for Communists' unyielding antagonism to more moderate organizers, who were branded "social fascists." TUUL activists attempted to organize some of the most marginal populations of the working class, such as the unemployed, women, and Blacks in the racially segregated American South.

=== Development of the Union ===
At its founding conference, the TUUL outlined that it would use three organizing strategies: forming national industrial unions along the lines of the NMU, NTWU and the NTWIU; in industries where the federation struggled to organize unions, grouping together local unions and shop committees into national industrial leagues; and organizing left-wing oppositions in the AFL unions. The TUUL largely focused on building extensive industrial unions and on inter-ethnic and inter-racial organizing. Specifically, the TUUL focused on promoting the rights of marginalized African American workers: "The advancement of the workers generally is inseparably bound up with the advancement of the Negroes." The TUUL viewed class struggle as a unifying experience for all workers. Beginning in 1928, when the TUUL the organization helped organize between 40,000 and 60,000 workers. The TUUL organized more than a dozen unions including the National Miners Union (NMU), the National Textile Workers Industrial Union, the Needle Trades Workers Industrial Union, and the Agricultural Workers Industrial League (which later became the Cannery and Agricultural Workers' Industrial Union). The TUUL also set up the Office Workers Union in New York with Gertrude Lane as its leader.

The passage of the National Industrial Recovery Act (NIRA) in 1933 led to increase in strike activity by the AFL and TUUL unions. With the enactment of the NIRA and the inclusion of Clause 7(a), which provided many private-sector workers with a federally protected right to organize, union membership in the United States increased considerably. Clause 7(a) of the NIRA was unclear regarding workers' legal right to collective-bargaining representation. Therefore, many employers established company unions in an attempt to prevent workers from joining AFL, TUUL, or independent unions. Nevertheless, the TUUL benefited from the National Industrial Recovery Act through significant increases in its membership. At one point, the TUUL had an estimated membership of 125,000 to 130,000 members. The CPUSA referred to the NIRA as "slave legislation" and considered its character to be protofascist. This was largely because the National Industrial Recovery Act promoted the regulation of prices, wages, and production through a tripartite relationship of labor, capital, and the state. CPUSA leader, Earl Browder, denounced the labor provisions of the NIRA as "the American version of Mussolini's 'corporative state,' special state controlled labor unions closely tied up with and under the direction of the employers." Furthermore, the CPUSA viewed the NIRA as an attempt by the state, capital, and AFL leaders to deter militancy within labor unions.

=== Successes and defeats ===
While TUUL unions suffered major defeats and had difficulty organizing in heavy and mass production industries, the TUUL experienced considerable success organizing in light industries. Specifically, the TUUL organized light industries in New York City. Many TUUL-led strikes were offensive in character and pushed for wage increases or improved working conditions. However, many of these strikes were spontaneous, thus the unions had little opportunity to prepare sufficiently. The TUUL attempted to carry out two major activities during work stoppages. The TUUL provided guidance and resources to those on strike and it sought to recruit members to affiliated unions. Although many TUUL-led strikes were lost, many of them resulted in substantial gains for the workers. These successes, however, did not necessarily lead to a long-term membership increases or organizational stability for the TUUL's unions.

=== Dissolution ===
The TUUL was dismantled in 1935 when the Comintern switched to the Popular Front strategy. CPUSA organizers then joined the industrial union movement under the Congress of Industrial Organizations, where they applied skills developed during the TUUL era. In 1935, with the formation of the Committee for Industrial Organization (soon to become the Congress of Industrial Organizations), and with the shift in the Communist Party's policy to the Popular Front strategy, the TUUL came to an end. Communist trade unions were ordered to enter CIO industrial unions or to work within existing AFL unions. Radical, communist unions were instructed by the CPUSA to join with the CIO and the AFL in order to promote general labor unity as well as industrial unionism. With the establishment of the Congress of Industrial Organizations (CIO) and the end of Third Period Communism in 1935, American communist leader, William Z. Foster, returned to a "boring from within" strategy. Thus, Foster and the CPUSA worked to integrate hundreds of Communist organizers into John L. Lewis's newly established industrial union organization. John L. Lewis, who had originally expelled Communist Party members from his United Miner Workers, now welcomed Communists to join the CIO. Other TUUL activists became leaders in the emerging CIO unions of the late 1930s. Communist leaders brought with them many of the organizational skills that they had developed in their time with the TUUL.

=== Legacy ===
Although the TUUL was able to organize many light industries in New York City, it is unlikely that the TUUL would have achieved prominent status given the organization's difficulty to recruit members from heavy industries. However, the vision of a democratic and activist trade unionism, which was bolstered by the TUUL, ultimately provided a bridge and a training ground for CPUSA trade union activists when they reentered the AFL in 1934. Former TUUL members played a role in organizing the CIO unions during the 1930s. The TUUL unions' struggle marks the inception of the CPUSA's commitment to building industrial unionism in the United States.

== Affiliated unions and headquarters ==
National organizations (As of 1931)

- Food and Packinghouse Workers Industrial League (New York)
- Lumber Workers Industrial League (Seattle)
- Marine Workers Industrial Union (MWIU) (New York)
- National Auto Workers Industrial Union (Detroit)
- National Metal Workers Industrial League (Pittsburgh)
- National Miners Union (Briefly known as Mine, Oil and Smelter Workers Industrial Union) (Pittsburgh)
- National Railroad Workers Industrial League (Chicago)
- National Textile Workers Union (New Bedford)
- Needle Trades Workers Industrial Union (New York)
- Shoe Workers Industrial Union (New York)

Others

- Agricultural Workers Industrial Union
- Amalgamated Clothing Workers Industrial Union
- Building Maintenance Workers Industrial Union
- Cleaning and Laundry Workers Industrial Union
- Fishermen and Cannery Workers Industrial Union
- Food Workers Industrial Union
- Fur Workers Industrial Union
- Furniture Workers Industrial Union
- Jewelry Workers Industrial Union
- Painters Industrial Union
- Rubber Workers Industrial Union
- Tobacco Workers Industrial Union

TUUL also had dedicated sections for Negroes, Women, and Youth.

== See also ==
- Trade Union Educational League
- Profintern
- Workers' Unity League
- Labor federation competition in the U.S.

== Publications ==
- Problems of Strike Strategy: Decisions of the International Conference on Strike Strategy, held in Strassburg, Germany, January 1929 New York: Workers Library Publishers, 1929.
- The Trade Union Unity League, Affiliated to RILU: Its Program, Structure, Methods and History. New York: Trade Union Unity League, 1929.
- William Z. Foster, Victorious Socialist Construction in the Soviet Union. New York: Trade Union Unity League, 1930.
- William Z. Foster, Little Brothers of the Big Labor Fakers: Report of a Speech against the Conference for Progressive Labor Action, Made in New Star Casino, New York City on May 10, 1931. New York: Trade Union Unity League, 1931.
- The Trade Union Unity League (American Section of the RILU): Its Program, Structure, Methods and History. New York: Trade Union Unity League, n.d. (1930s).
