= William Z. Foster =

American labor organizer and Communist politician (1881–1961)

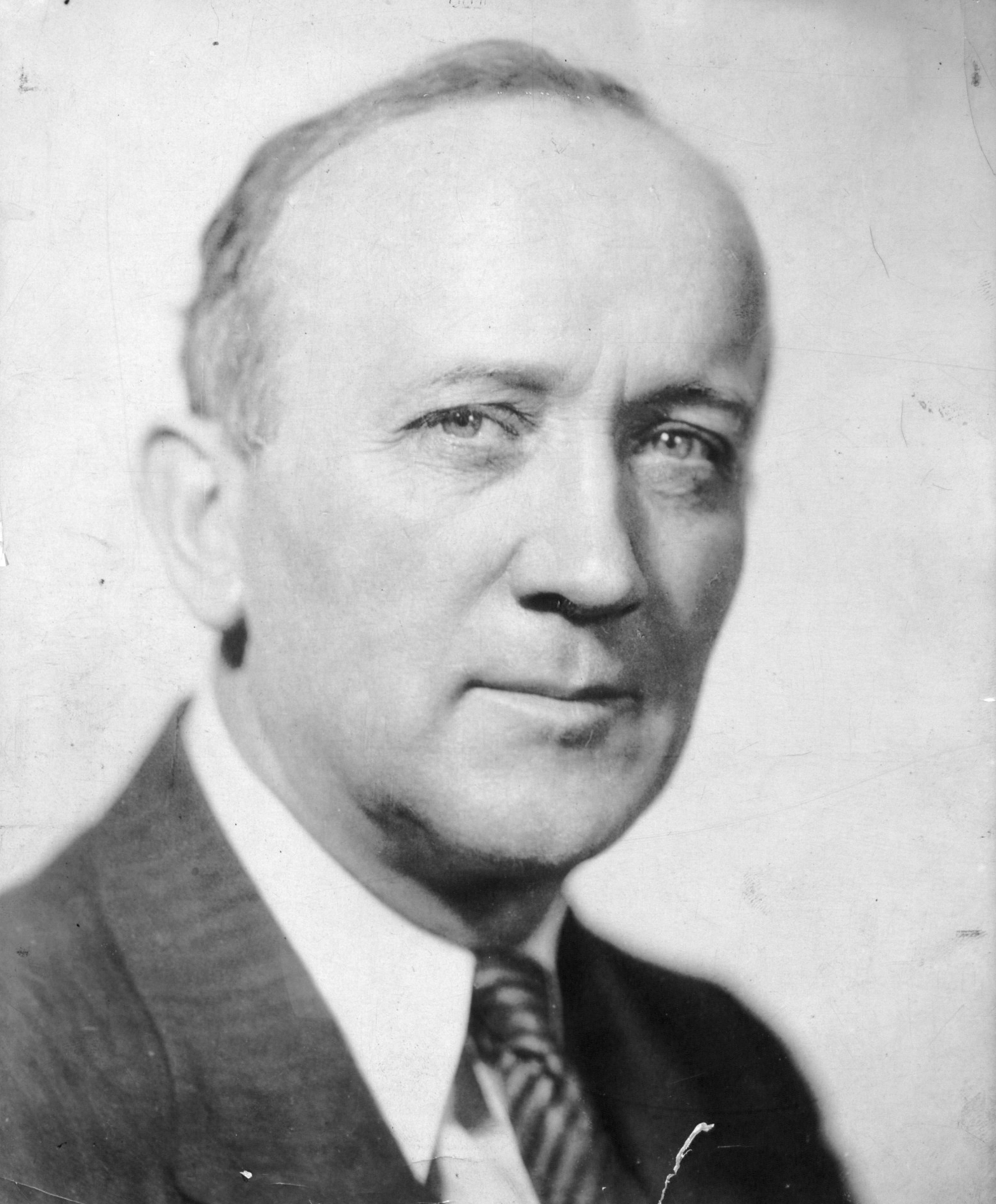
- Foster c. 1932

General Secretary of the Communist Party USA
- In office July 29, 1945 – February 12, 1957
- Preceded by: Earl Browder
- Succeeded by: Eugene Dennis

Chairman of the Communist Party USA
- In office May 17, 1929 – July 29, 1945
- Preceded by: Jay Lovestone
- Succeeded by: Eugene Dennis

Personal details
- Born: William Edward Foster; February 25, 1881 Taunton, Massachusetts, U.S.
- Died: September 1, 1961 (aged 80) Moscow, Russian SFSR, Soviet Union
- Party: Socialist Party of America (1901–1909); Communist Party USA (1921–1961)
- Other political affiliations: Wage Workers (1909–1910); Syndicalist League (1912–1914)
- Occupation: Trade union leader; politician

William Z. Foster (Note: Foster is often incorrectly referred to with the middle name "Zebulon". He added the middle initial "Z" when he was 28 years old, but according to biographer Edward Johanningsmeier, the initial "was never intended by Foster to indicate a middle name." He also never referred to himself as William "Zebulon". He reportedly chose the "Z" to (1) add distinction to his "William Foster" byline, and (2) ensure he received mail that might otherwise get delivered to another "William E.") (born William Edward Foster; February 25, 1881 – September 1, 1961) was a radical American labor organizer and Communist politician, whose career included serving as General Secretary of the Communist Party USA from 1945 to 1957. He was previously a member of the Socialist Party of America and the Industrial Workers of the World, leading the drive to organize packinghouse industry workers during World War I and the steel strike of 1919.

== Early life ==
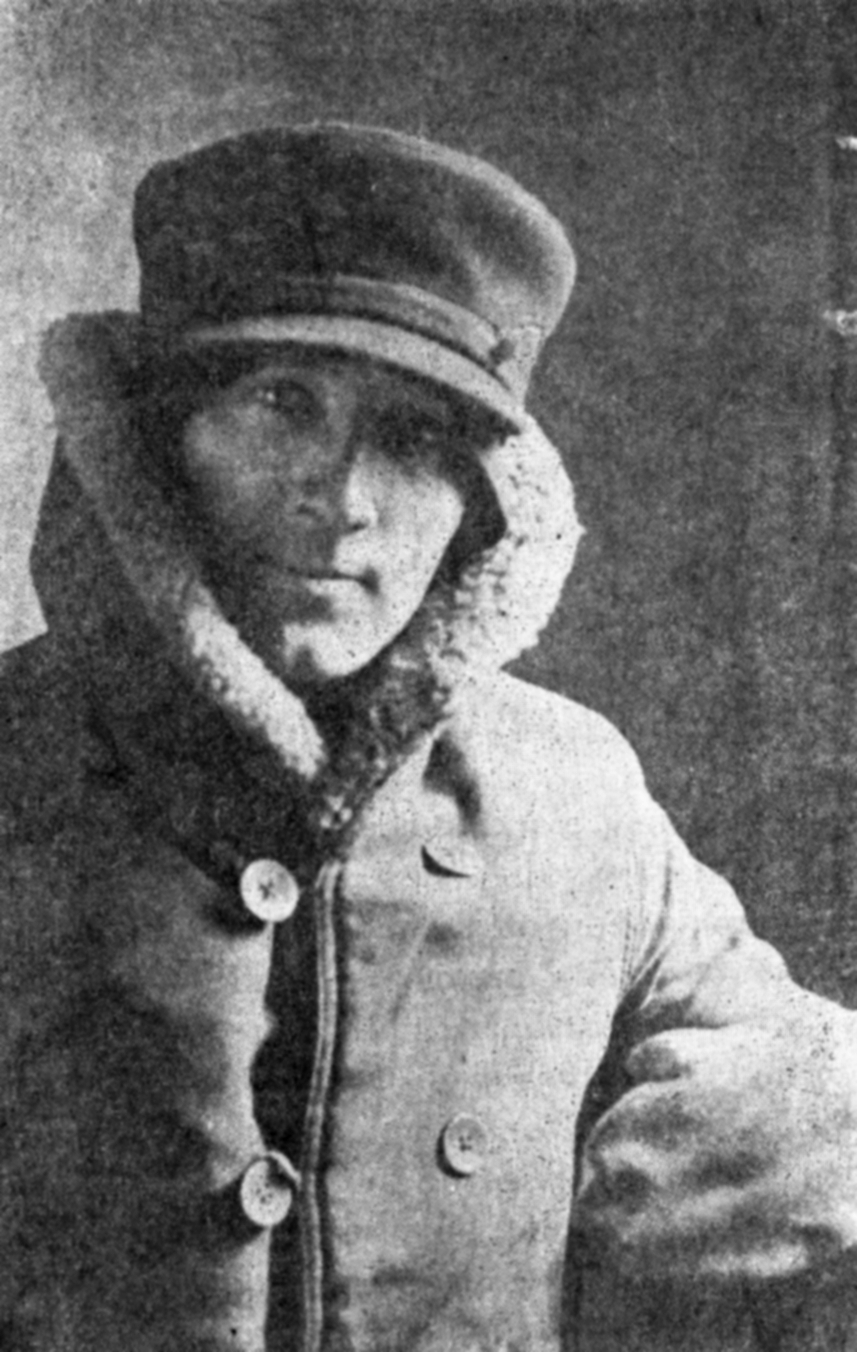
Foster as a railroad worker before the First World War

He was born William Edward Foster in Taunton, Massachusetts, on February 24, 1881, the son of a Fenian, James Foster, who had fled County Carlow after the failure of the revolutionary Fenian Rising in Ireland and the waves of arrests that drove hundreds of others out of the country. His mother, Elizabeth McLoughlin, was an English Catholic textile worker. His mother had nine surviving children of 23 babies she bore.

His family moved to the Irish area of Skittereen within the Moyamensing neighborhood of South Philadelphia, where his father worked as a stableman and was part of a group of Irish-American Fenians. Foster left school at the age of ten to apprentice himself to a dye sinker. Foster left that position three years later to work at a type foundry and then in a white lead factory. Over the next ten years he worked in fertilizer plants in Reading, Pennsylvania, and Jacksonville, Florida; as a railroad construction worker and lumberman in Florida; as a streetcar motorman in New York City; as a lumberman and longshoreman in Portland, Oregon; and as a sailor. He also homesteaded in Oregon from 1904 to 1907, working various odd jobs as a miner, sheepherder, sawmill worker, and railroad employee during that time.

== Political career ==
Foster joined the Socialist Party of America in 1901 and was a member of its Oregon affiliate and later its Washington state affiliate. He left the party in the midst of a faction fight in 1909. He then joined the Industrial Workers of the World (IWW), taking part in one of its free speech fights in Spokane, Washington.

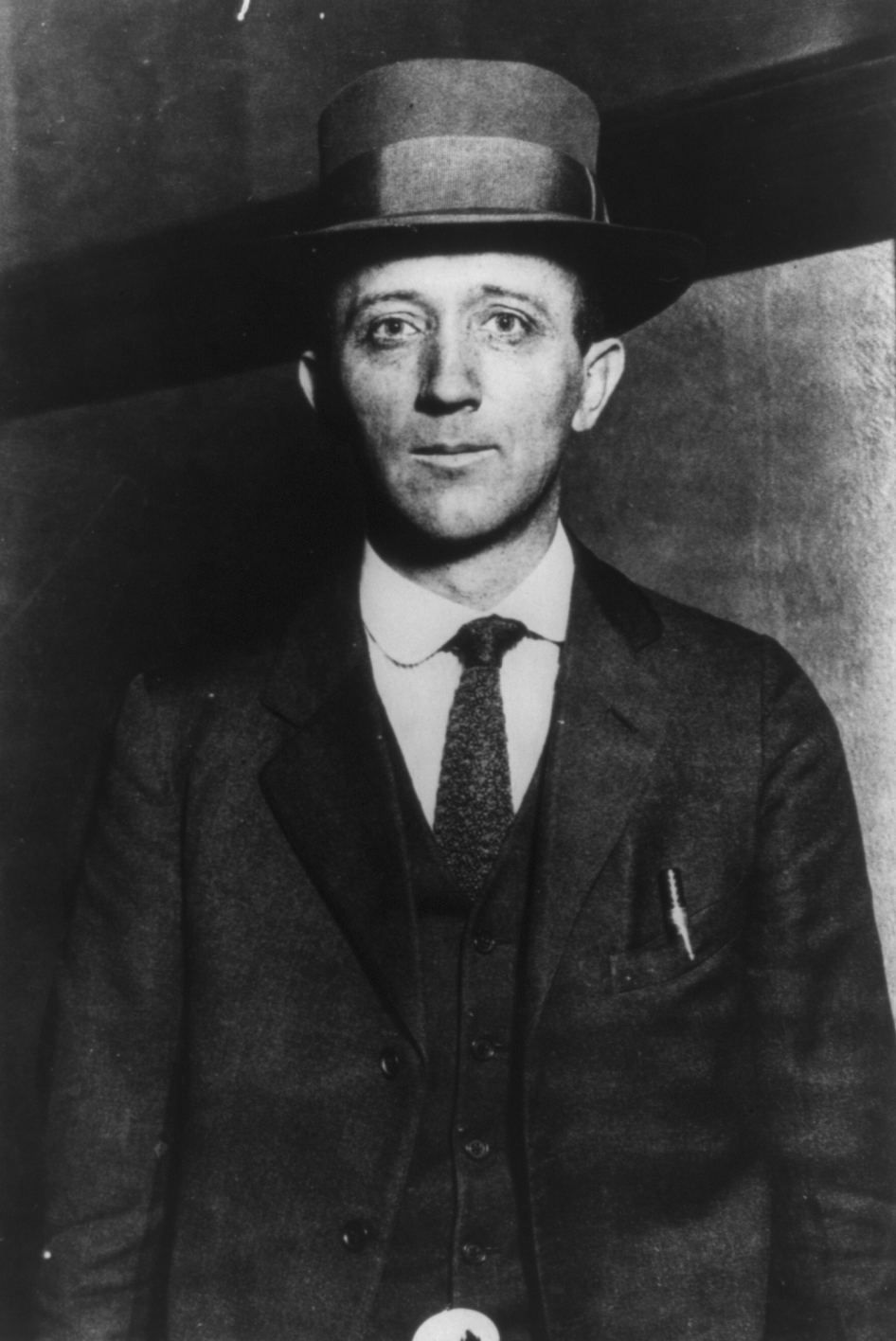
Foster, undated

Foster became a prominent figure in the IWW. He served as its representative at an international labor conference in Budapest in 1911 and contributed to its papers. His politics, however, were moving him away from the IWW. He became a committed syndicalist after touring Europe in 1910 and 1911, and he criticized the IWW for not working within established unions. He urged American leftists to join the relatively conservative American Federation of Labor (AFL) unions to take control of them—a strategy called "boring from within"—instead of trying to establish rival unions, as the IWW had tried to do. Foster failed to convince the IWW to adopt this position, however, and he eventually left it and formed his own organization, the Syndicalist League of North America (SLNA).

In Foster's 1912 pamphlet Syndicalism, he argues for direct action at the shop floor level, which he believed would lead to workers governing society through "shop organizations". Foster biographer James R. Barnett argues that this pamphlet shows the influence of anarchist thought, and several members of the newly-founded SLNA—including Jay Fox and Esther Abramowitz, Foster's future wife—were anarchists. Other members of the SLNA included Earl Browder, an accountant and union activist from Kansas City who Foster met in 1913; James P. Cannon, an IWW member; and Tom Mooney, a left-wing socialist activist. By 1914, however, the SLNA had broken up. Foster stated that it "crumbled away into disconnected groups of militants working here and there in the trade union movement", whereas Fox said that they had simply "decided to lay off for a while".

After the disintegration of the SLNA, Foster became vice president of the AFL-affiliated International Union of Shingle Weavers, Sawmill Workers and Woodsmen. After his appointment expired, he moved to Chicago in 1915, becoming an inspector for Swift & Company at the Union Stock Yards. That year, he was appointed as a general organizer for the AFL and founded the International Trade Union Educational League (ITUEL). He outlined his labor philosophy in his 1915 pamphlet Trade Unionism: The Road to Freedom, arguing that radicals did not need to advocate for revolution in unions because organizing workers was an inherently radical act, even if it meant compromising with conservative union leaders.

The following year, in 1916, he became a union business agent for a Chicago local of the Brotherhood of Railway Carmen of America. Through the ITUEL, he insinuated himself into the Chicago Federation of Labor (CFL), a trade union federation headed by John Fitzpatrick. He also advocated for a number of major labor-related causes, including a campaign to free Mooney, who gained support from labor activists when he was imprisoned for allegedly throwing a bomb at a Preparedness Day parade in 1916. Unlike Eugene V. Debs, Morris Hillquit, Victor Berger, and some other socialists, he did not publicly oppose the United States's entry into World War I. He helped sell war bonds in 1918, as did many other labor advocates, including Mother Jones. However, Foster biographer Edward P. Johanningsmeier speculates that he married Abramowitz in 1918 to avoid conscription.

=== Organizing packinghouse workers ===
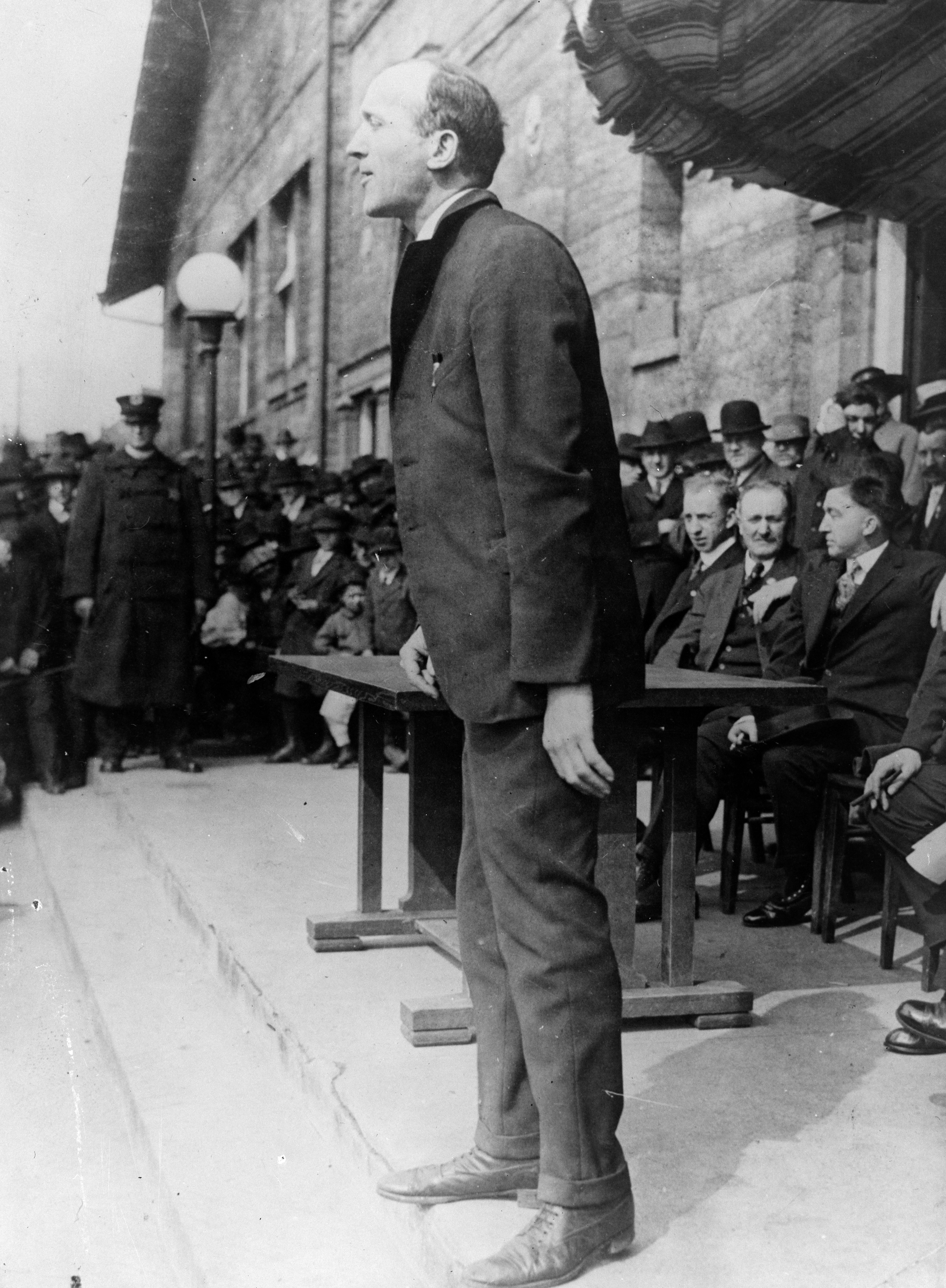
Foster gives a speech to packinghouse workers

In 1917, Foster and the CFL turned their attention to Chicago's meat-packing industry. Unions had tried to organize the packinghouses for decades before World War I. The Knights of Labor led organizing drives among these workers in the early 1880s, and the Amalgamated Meat Cutters and Butcher Workmen made gains among the industry's many diverse ethnic groups in the first decade of the 20th century. By 1904, however, union activity in the packinghouses of the Union Stock Yards had declined.

With America's entry into the World War I, the demand for meat increased tremendously while conscription and the near standstill of immigration from Europe led to labor shortages that improved workers' collective bargaining power. In addition, the federal government had an interest in maintaining production unimpeded and avoiding the disruption that a packinghouse workers' strike would entail. Before the CFL could organize these workers, it had to resolve the competing claims of the various unions that represented different segments of the industry.

Due to their ethnic and racial diversity and the high percentage of unskilled workers among them, Foster believed that organizing stockyards workers on an industrial rather than craft basis was crucial. Instead of founding a new organization to do this, Foster and the CFL planned to create a Stockyards Labor Council (SLC). Like the recently formed railroad federations, the SLC would unite all interested unions into a single body with the ability to organize the industry as a whole. Foster obtained the endorsement of his union, the Railway Carmen, for this plan, and then took the proposal to Local 87 of the Amalgamated Meat Cutters, who supported it. He obtained the CFL's approval on July 15, 1917.

The SLC was formed a week later with representatives from many crafts, including machinists, electricians, carpenters, coopers, office workers, steamfitters, engineers, railway carmen, and firemen. While this body lacked the authority to negotiate grievances or propose wage scales for all the workers in the industry, it operated under a single, united executive board and employed a single, unified group of business agents and organizers. This "infused [the] whole movement with the spirit of industrial unionism" according to Foster, who was elected secretary of the council.

Another factor posed a serious obstacle to organizing packinghouse workers. As part of the Great Migration, thousands of Black Americans from the Southern United States migrated to Chicago, with many going to work in the packinghouses. Tensions were high between Black and white workers. Many of the unions in the SLC excluded Black Americans from membership, either overtly or covertly, and Black workers were wary of these unions. Meanwhile, white workers viewed Black workers as potential strikebreakers after many were employed as such during a 1904 strike. As a compromise, to give Black workers an alternative to discriminatory craft unions, the SLC offered membership in segregated, majority-Black, AFL-affiliated locals. Many Black workers were unsatisfied with this compromise, ultimately dropping out of these segregated locals. The same pattern of division prevailed among immigrant workers, who were organized along linguistic and ethnic lines.

Under these conditions, with the support of more militant union officials and rank-and-file workers, Foster pushed the unions toward a strike, arguing that conditions were ideal. While he faced opposition from more conservative union officials, he secured the votes for a strike in the fall of 1917. Fearing the effects of an impending strike, and with workers pushing the federal government to seize the packinghouses, the Wilson administration pressured the employers to agree to arbitration about wages and hours. The arbitration board, led by Judge Samuel Alschuler, ordered the companies to institute the eight-hour day, overtime pay, and paid lunches and holidays. Workers also received significant wage increases. This empowered the unions, and the Amalgamated Meat Cutters' membership doubled in the following months.

These gains proved short-lived. Real wages began to decline, and further arbitration from Alschuler in 1919 yielded only small wage increases, denying workers' demands for double-time overtime pay, a forty-hour workweek, and the abolition of piece rates at railroad car shops. Then, in July 1919, the drowning of a Black boy on the lakefront ignited a "race riot", with much of the violence taking place near the packinghouses. The SLC called on white unionists to protect their Black counterparts, but after arsonists attacked a Lithuanian neighborhood, rumors spread that the vengeful Black people were responsible. Tensions reached a boiling point. While the union was able to avert outright violence between workers, locals began to defect. Soon after the riots, the Amalgamated Meat Cutters tried to establish a competing labor council, District Council 9, breaking off relations with the SLC. A third council, the Mechanical Trades Council, also formed. By 1920, the SLC had collapsed. As soon as the arbitration agreement expired, employers cut wages, and after several failed strikes by the Amalgamated Meat Cutters, many workers switched to company unions.

=== The Steel Strike of 1919 ===
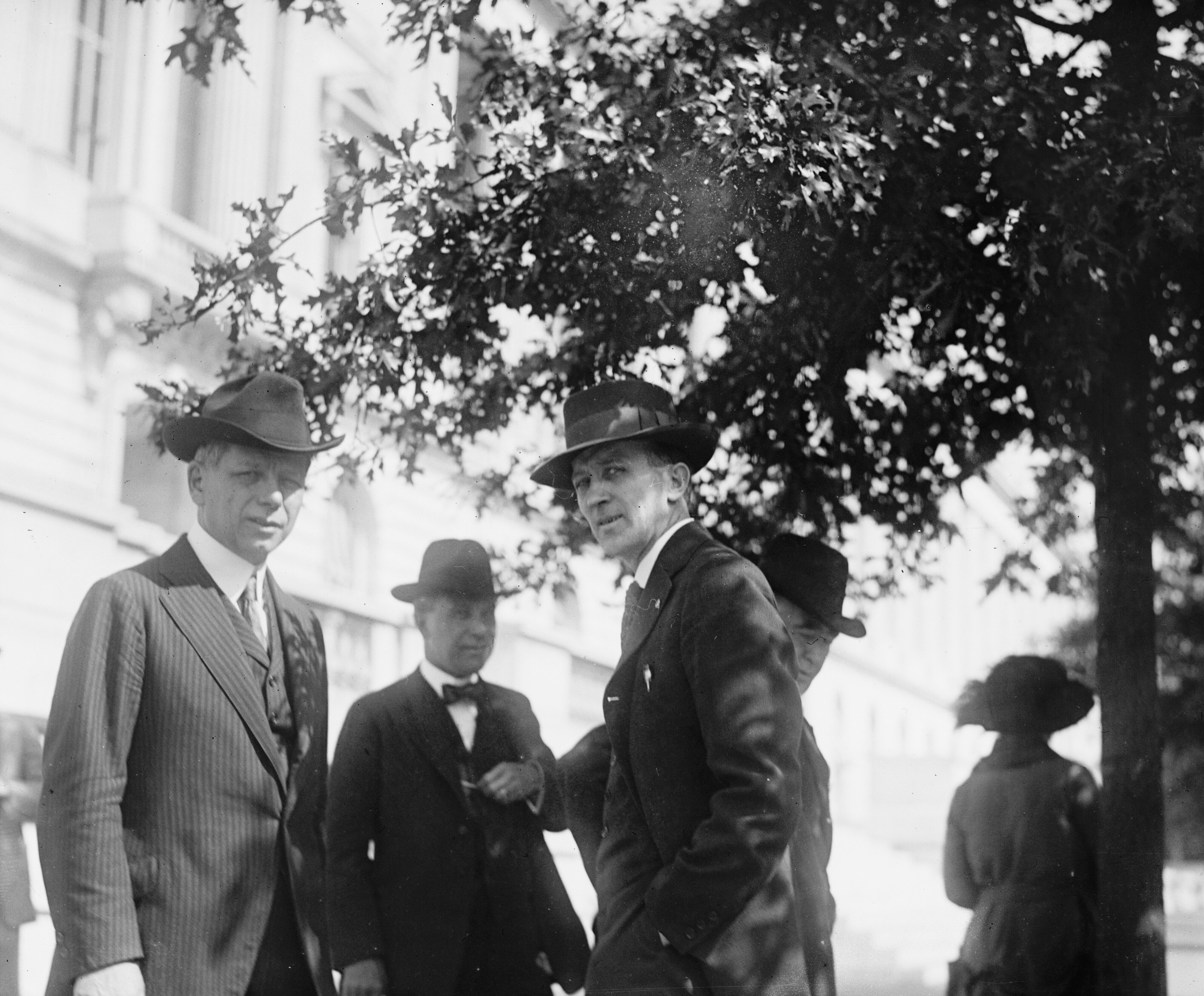
Foster (right) during the Steel Strike of 1919

While the packinghouse campaign was still underway, Foster turned his attention to another project: organizing steel workers. The problems here were even more complex. In addition to a history of failed strikes and deep ethnic divisions within the workforce, the steel mills were divided by skill level. The higher-paid, native-born skilled workers frequently looked down on their immigrant coworkers, who were often considered unskilled or semiskilled.

Foster proposed a similar strategy to his previous campaign but on a much larger scale: a mass union drive led by a federation of existing unions in every major steel production center. The goal would be to recruit enough workers that executives would be forced to negotiate. Fitzpatrick supported the project, and Foster presented the plan at the AFL's 1918 convention, which he attended as a representative of the Railway Carmen. The AFL's reception was tepid. It endorsed a special conference to create a committee to organize steel workers—the National Committee for Organizing Iron and Steel Workers—but each constituent union contributed only US$100 to the committee's upkeep, leaving the committee with much less than the $250,000 Foster estimated it needed. However, some unions did contribute organizers.

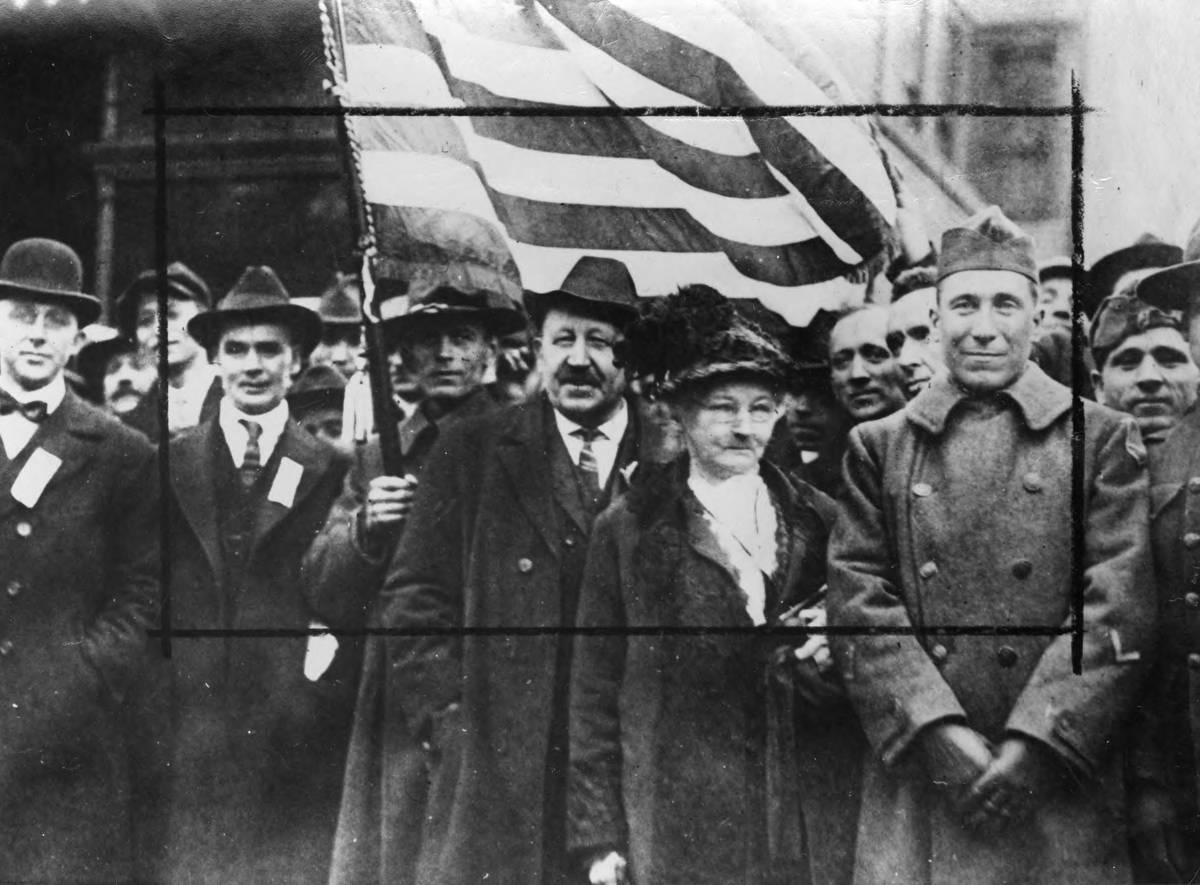
Foster (in box, right, second behind soldier's shoulder), Philip Murray, James H. Maurer and Mother Jones surrounded by steel workers and unionists in uniform during the Steel Strike of 1919

Without the funds to launch a truly national campaign, Foster sent organizers to the Chicago neighborhoods of South Chicago and Indiana Harbor and to areas around Chicago, such as Gary, Indiana, and Joliet, Illinois. The Chicago area was not, however, the heart of the steel industry. The Monongahela Valley was. By the time that Foster sent organizers to this area several months into the campaign, the 1918 flu epidemic had led the authorities to ban public meetings. The announcement of the armistice ending World War I also resulted in widespread layoffs at the mills as war-related orders were cancelled. Even so, the National Committee managed to sign up more than 100,000 steel workers by early 1919. In August 1919, a strike vote was taken. The result was almost unanimous in favor. When the steel companies refused to meet with union officials, 250,000 steelworkers went on strike on September 22.

The National Committee's organizing efforts had produced mixed results. It enrolled around 350,000 steelworkers during the course of the strike, finding the most success with immigrant workers. Higher-skilled, native-born workers gave the strike only lukewarm support. Black steelworkers gave it almost none in the Pittsburgh area and less-than-enthusiastic support elsewhere.

Authorities in Allegheny County, Pennsylvania, responded to the strike by instituting a ban on public assemblies of three or more people, deputizing 5,000 vigilantes to enforce it. Violence ensued, and within 10 days, 14 people had been killed, all of them strikers or strike sympathizers. Throughout the strike, vigilantes clashed with strikers in the affected regions. At one point, a group of 40 expelled Foster from Johnstown, Pennsylvania, at gunpoint. Foster was also subpoenaed as part of an inquiry initiated by the United States Senate Committee on Education and Labor to study the causes of the strike. He was interrogated about his radical background and his pamphlet Syndicalism, and the report produced by the committee concluded that organized labor "must keep men who entertain and formulate un-American doctrines out of its ranks".

Foster spent most of his time raising money and organizing material assistance for strikers and their families. In the meantime, General Leonard Wood imposed martial law in Gary while authorities in Pennsylvania harassed strikers in the streets and broke up strike meetings wherever they could be found. By November, the strike was losing steam. While organizers tried to keep it going through December, it ended on January 8, 1920. Foster resigned from the National Committee in order to allow it to continue its work "with a clean slate".

=== Joining the Communist Party ===
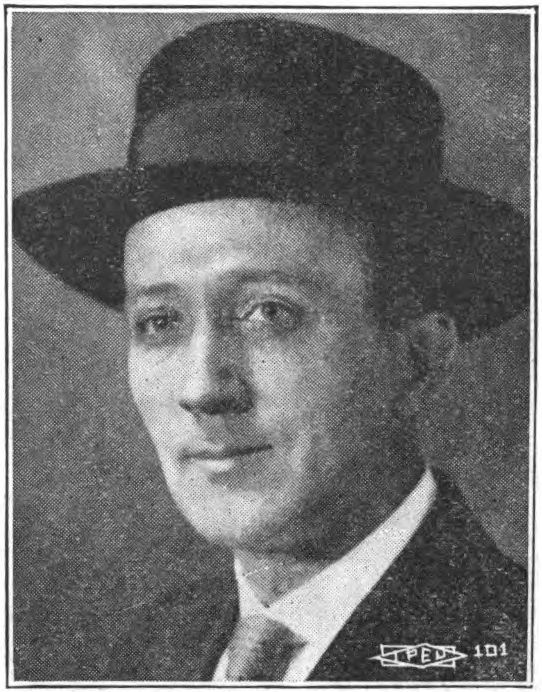
Foster c. 1923

After his resignation from the National Committee, Foster was at loose ends. He resigned from his position as a Brotherhood of Railway Carmen organizer but was blacklisted from other jobs on the railroad. He maintained his friendship with John Fitzpatrick and wrote a book analyzing the steel strike. He also founded the Trade Union Educational League (TUEL) (Note: Not to be confused with the earlier ITUEL. For more info, see § The Trade Union Educational League.) in November 1920. That year, he led a TUEL speaking tour in 1920 on behalf of the Amalgamated Clothing Workers of America, a left-led union that had contributed $100,000 to support strikers during the steel strike.

Foster had contacts with several members of the newly-formed Communist Party of America but had not joined it after its split from the Socialist Party of America in 1919. During the steel strike, the party had denounced Foster as an opportunist and class collaborator, calling him "E.Z. Foster" for the accommodations he was willing to make with the AFL leadership. However, after the strike, Foster was brought within the party's orbit when Browder, now a Communist Party member, invited him to attend a conference of the Profintern in Moscow in 1921. There, he was appointed as a Profintern special representative in the United States, joining the Communist Party upon his return. The TUEL was later made an affiliate of the Profintern in 1923.

=== The Trade Union Educational League ===
The TUEL, like the SLNA and ITUEL, sought to encourage the development of left activists within established unions, to unite those already there around a platform of industrial unionism, and to support the militant struggle for workers' rights. It took pains to avoid accusations of dual unionism. When the Profintern requested that the TUEL start building itself as a mass membership organization, Foster demurred. Fearing expulsion from the labor movement, he argued that the TUEL should remain a network of activists with no formal membership. The TUEL was strongest in Chicago, where Foster and Communist Party member Jack Johnstone were closely connected to Fitzpatrick and many other unionists who were involved in labor radicalism. It campaigned for union amalgamation, the abolition of capitalism, the creation of a Labor Party, and recognition of the Soviet Union.

The TUEL's first test was the Railway Shopmen's strike of 1922. It leafleted and picketed in areas of major strike activity, and Foster went on a speaking tour urging unionized workers to amalgamate. In Denver, Colorado, he was arrested by the Colorado Rangers and ejected from the state. The strike was defeated in September after the Hoover administration issued an injunction prohibiting assemblies near train stations, depots, shops, terminals, and yards. It also banned picketing and the distribution of leaflets aimed at discouraging strikebreaking.

The TUEL also intervened in the internal politics of the United Mine Workers of America (UMWA), where workers aligned with union organizer Alexander Howat struck against the orders of UMWA president John L. Lewis after Howat was imprisoned. Lewis responded by expelling all Howat supporters from the union in 1923. This sparked a conflict between Lewis supporters and Howat supporters, backed by the TUEL, which culminated in a clash at the UMWA's 1924 convention. While the Howat faction received considerable support, its demands—including the nationalization of the mines, a six-four workday, a five-day workweek, and Howat's reinstatement—were ultimately rejected. Howat and his supporters remained outside the union, but the TUEL remained an important organizing force for the union's anti-Lewis left. Foster and Howat remained on good terms.

=== The Farmer-Labor Party ===
In 1919, Fitzpatrick, with whom Foster had a close relationship, established the Farmer-Labor Party—a broad coalition of leftist radicals and progressives. By 1923, Fitzpatrick's party had garnered considerable support from the left flank of the labor movement. With Foster's support, some Communists were able to join the Farmer-Labor Party. However, in 1922, the Communist newspaper The Worker published a flattering article about Foster that identified him as a Communist. Fitzpatrick began to distance himself from Foster when his membership in the party became public knowledge.

At a meeting of the party's Central Executive Committee, Foster debated its approach to the Farmer-Labor Party with fellow party officials John Pepper and Charles Ruthenberg. Pepper hoped that the Communists would play a significant role in the new party, but Fitzpatrick had said they should "occupy a back seat in the affair". While Foster and Ruthenberg were afraid of alienating Fitzpatrick, Pepper insisted that the Communists try to pack the convention. His plan was approved by the committee, and Foster and Ruthenberg began working to execute it.

Foster had enough influence within the CFL to pack the convention with representatives of various organizations, many of which were fictitious. When the Communists appeared to have taken over this new party, Fitzpatrick walked out, later saying that the communists had "kill[ed]" the Farmer-Labor Party. Unionists spurned the new party, and miners' and needleworkers' unions also began to campaign against the TUEL. Against Foster's wishes and at Pepper's insistence, the party soon split with the popular Minnesota Farmer–Labor Party and repudiated its candidate for the 1924 United States presidential election, Robert M. La Follette. After a disastrous showing in the election, however, the Communist-led Farmer–Labor Party collapsed in every state but Illinois.

=== Power struggles ===
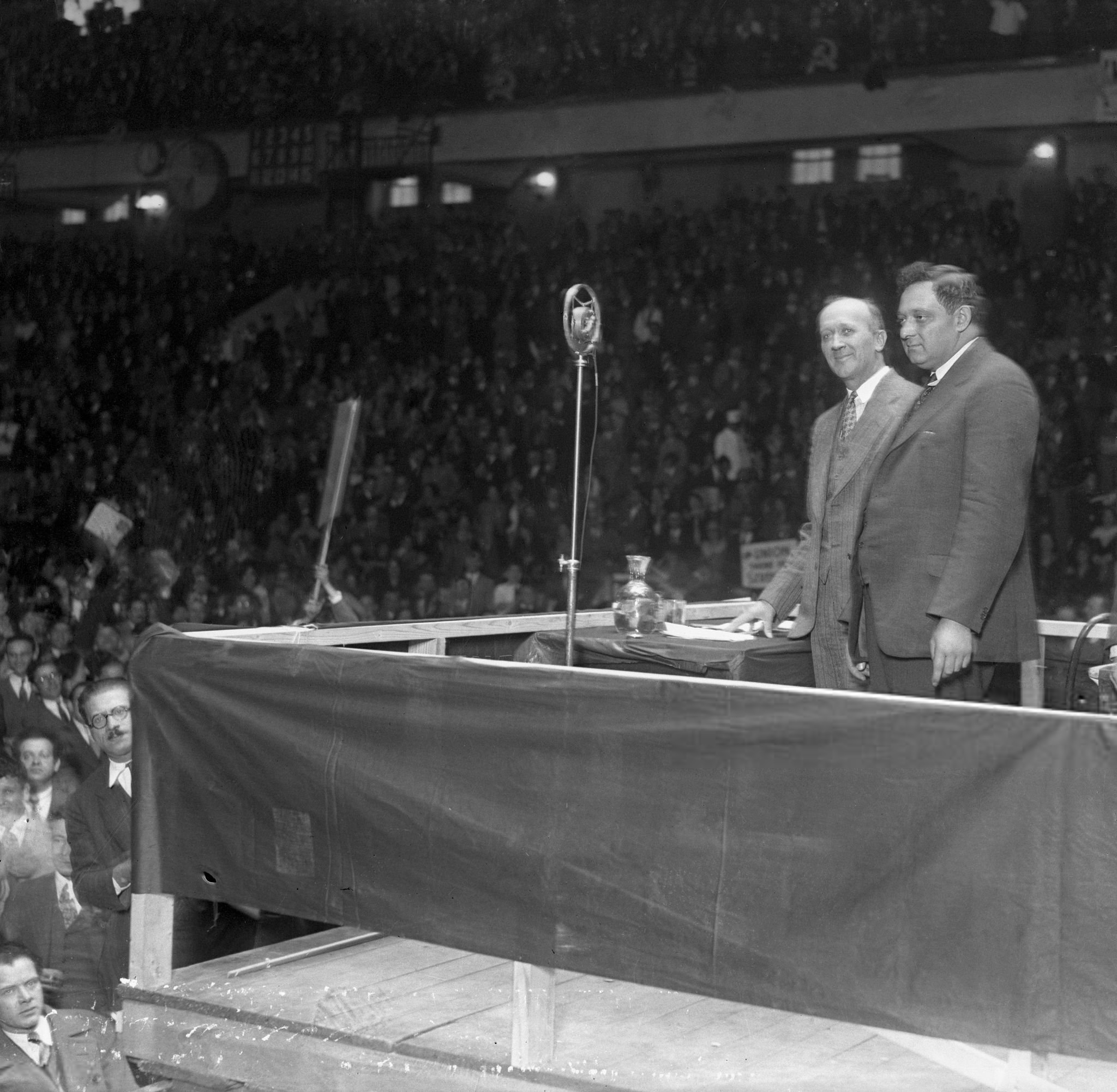
Presidential candidate William Z. Foster with Vice Presidential candidate Benjamin Gitlow at a Workers Party rally at Madison Square Garden, 1924 or 1928

In the wake of the Farmer-Labor Party's collapse, the Communists became isolated from the labor movement, splitting into two factions: one led by Foster and James P. Cannon and another by Ruthenberg and activist Jay Lovestone. Each vied for control of the Workers Party of America, the Communist Party's primary front organization in the United States. (Note: Whereas the Communist Party of America was officially outlawed when the Workers Party was founded in 1921, the Workers Party operated legally. The parties consolidated into the Workers (Communist) Party in 1925. For simplicity, both parties (and the later Communist Party USA) are sometimes simply referred to as "the party" in this article.) The Ruthenberg-Lovestone faction argued that the Communists should continue trying to establish a labor party, while the Foster-Cannon faction considered the idea to be dead. Foster became the Workers Party chairman in 1923. Meanwhile, Pepper was recalled by the Comintern after the 1924 United States presidential election.

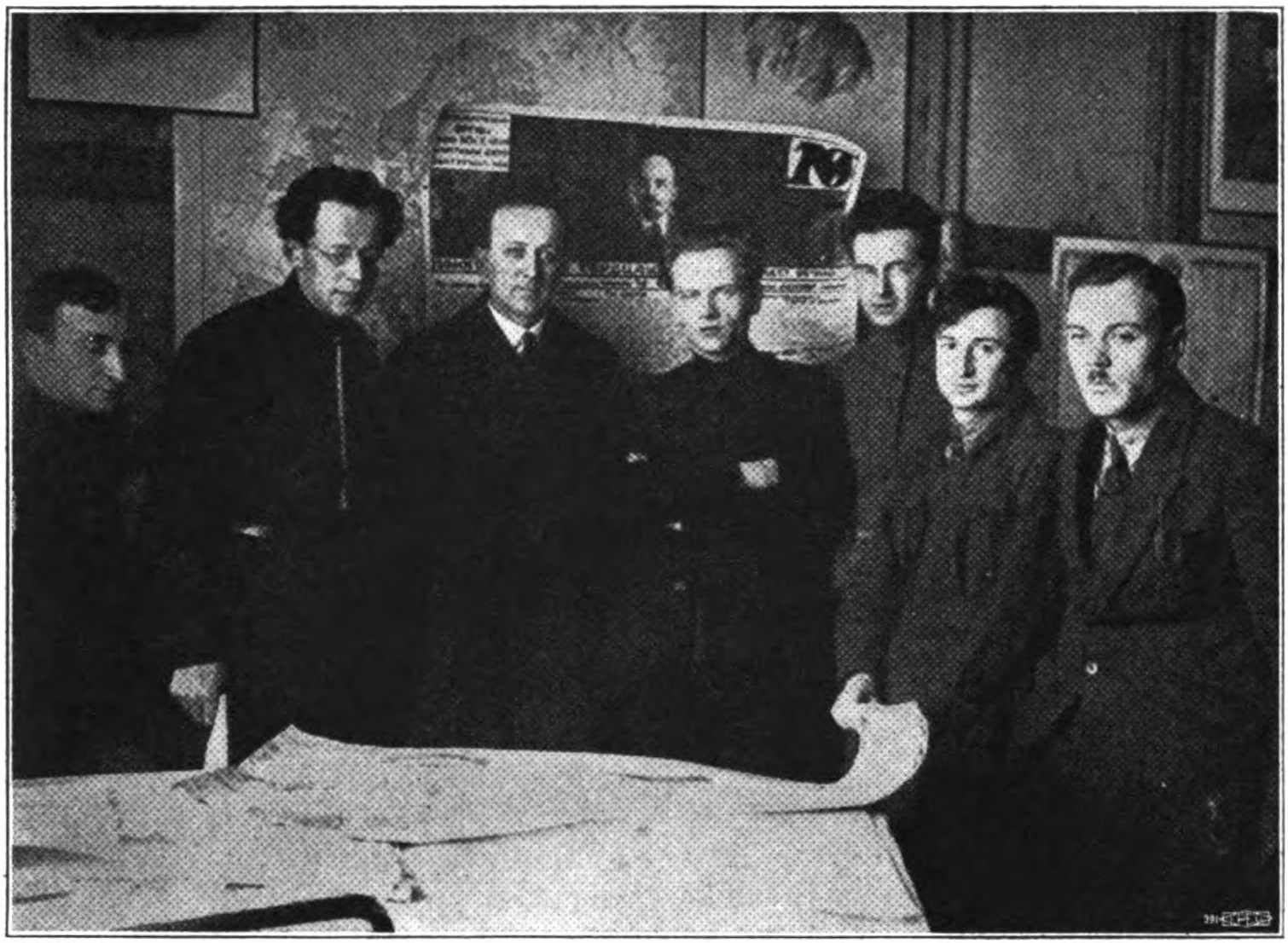
Foster (third from left) with the editorial staff of Gudok (The Whistle), the official organ of the Russian railroad workers' union, 1925

The Comintern was disturbed by the internecine struggles between the two camps, creating a "parity commission", chaired by Soviet official Sergey Ivanovich Gusev, to oversee the party's 1925 convention. The convention voted decisively to install Foster as chairman over his opponent, Benjamin Gitlow. However, on the final day, a telegram from the Comintern indicated that it supported Ruthenberg for leadership. Furious, Foster stormed out of the convention. Over the objections of his opponents and his ally Cannon, who characterized his actions as "disloyal", he tried to appeal to the Comintern to reverse its decision. He did not succeed, but he did obtain some concessions. His supporters were given control of the party's Trade Union Committee, and the Comintern recognized trade union work as the party's most important activity. Foster mistakenly believed that he had also obtained support for the TUEL to operate independently from the party, but in fact, the party took control of its operations, firing many of its members and moving its headquarters from Chicago to New York City.

=== Trade union work ===
==== 1926 Textile strikes ====
The party's trade union work in this era met with mixed results. In 1926, a strike supported by the Communist-controlled New York Joint Board of the International Ladies' Garment Workers' Union ended with wage increases and a 5-day, 40-hour workweek. However, the core demand that shops stop "reorganizing" by firing workers once a year was not met. Critics of this settlement, such as Central Strike Committee Secretary Charles S. Zimmerman, argue that there were opportunities to settle the strike in terms more favorable to the workers but that Communist infighting caused leadership to prolong the strike in order to occupy a "revolutionary high ground". Meanwhile, Foster argued that socialist strike leaders intentionally undermined the strike by sabotaging the collection of strike funds and "spread[ing] defeatism" amongst workers. Researcher John Holmes, responding to Zimmerman's account, argues that "what looked to Zimmerman like factional meddling may have seemed to the activists at this meeting more like the will of the rank and file overriding vacillation at the top". He further argues that the strike leaders' unwillingness to work with Foster, who had more experience with strikes than they did, was one of the key factors that led to the unsatisfactory settlement.

That same year, the Communists led a textile workers' strike in Passaic, New Jersey. The strike began after Botany Mills instituted a 10% wage cut. When the United Textile Workers of America (UTW) refused to contest the cut, a group of workers formed the United Front Committee (UFC) to fight it. Foster and Ruthenberg argued about the best approach to the strike. When members of the UFC tried to collect union dues and issued membership cards, Foster objected, accusing them of trying to form a dual union. Meanwhile, Ruthenberg supported the move. The strike received considerable support from workers at Botany Mills and from sympathy strikers at other mills. However, employers refused to negotiate with the UFC, the Comintern issued a policy condemning dual unions, and after ten months, Foster and the Communist leadership ordered the UFC to hand over leadership of the strike to the UTW. The UTW did not pursue the strike aggressively, and when it ended on November 11, the workers had gained little.

==== "Save the Union" campaign ====
Foster also played a significant role in John Brophy's campaign for leadership of the UMWA. Brophy, a UMWA leader in western Pennsylvania, ran against Lewis under the slogan "Save the Union". The vote tallies indicated a landslide victory for Lewis. While there was evidence of massive electoral fraud, Brophy and his allies chose not to contest the results. The "Save the Union" campaign continued, but it struggled after the vote. Miners who supported the campaign were threatened with expulsion, and Brophy lost his union position. However, it continued to advocate for workers. During the 1927 Indiana bituminous strike, it helped maintain the strike by running its own relief program separate from the union, taking over relief distribution from the UMWA in many towns.

The campaign was beginning to resemble a dual union, which Foster opposed. However, as signals from the Comintern indicated an impending change in policy during the Third Period, the American party was directed to abandon its work within the AFL and form separate revolutionary unions. Members of the party, including Earl Browder, began criticizing him for his reluctance to establish a dual union of miners. Brophy dropped out of the movement, believing that there was not sufficient support in the mining industry for a dual union. Without his support, the Communists founded the National Miners' Union to compete with the UMWA in 1928.

=== Foster's return to power ===
Ruthenberg died on March 2, 1927, and Lovestone, his longtime factional ally, took over his position as leader of the party. The factional fighting between the Foster and Lovestone groups continued but now became overshadowed by the larger struggle in the Soviet Union between Joseph Stalin and his opponents. An ostensible supporter of Joseph Stalin, (Note: Foster regularly praised Stalin and supported Stalinist show trials and executions in the Soviet Union. However, Cannon argues that Foster's support for Stalin was "tongue in cheek". Leon Trotsky argues that Foster tried to "conceal himself with the defensive coloration of Stalinism in order by this contraband route to move toward the leadership of the American party". After Stalin's death, Foster joined Nikita Khrushchev in criticizing his leadership (see § Smith Act trials).) Foster split with Cannon in 1928 and supported his former ally's expulsion for Trotskyism. When the party shifted to its Third Period line, Lovestone also fell out of favor. This was partly due to his support for Nikolai Bukharin, who was believed to represent a "right danger" to the party. As a result, Foster was made chairman of the party with the support of the Comintern at the party's March 1929 convention.

The Third Period line also called for creation of new, revolutionary unions outside the AFL. While Foster had always denounced dual unionism, he complied with the Comintern's directive, renaming the Trade Union Education League as the Trade Union Unity League (TUUL). He and the party also followed the line by denouncing social democrats as "social fascists".

=== Eclipse by Browder ===
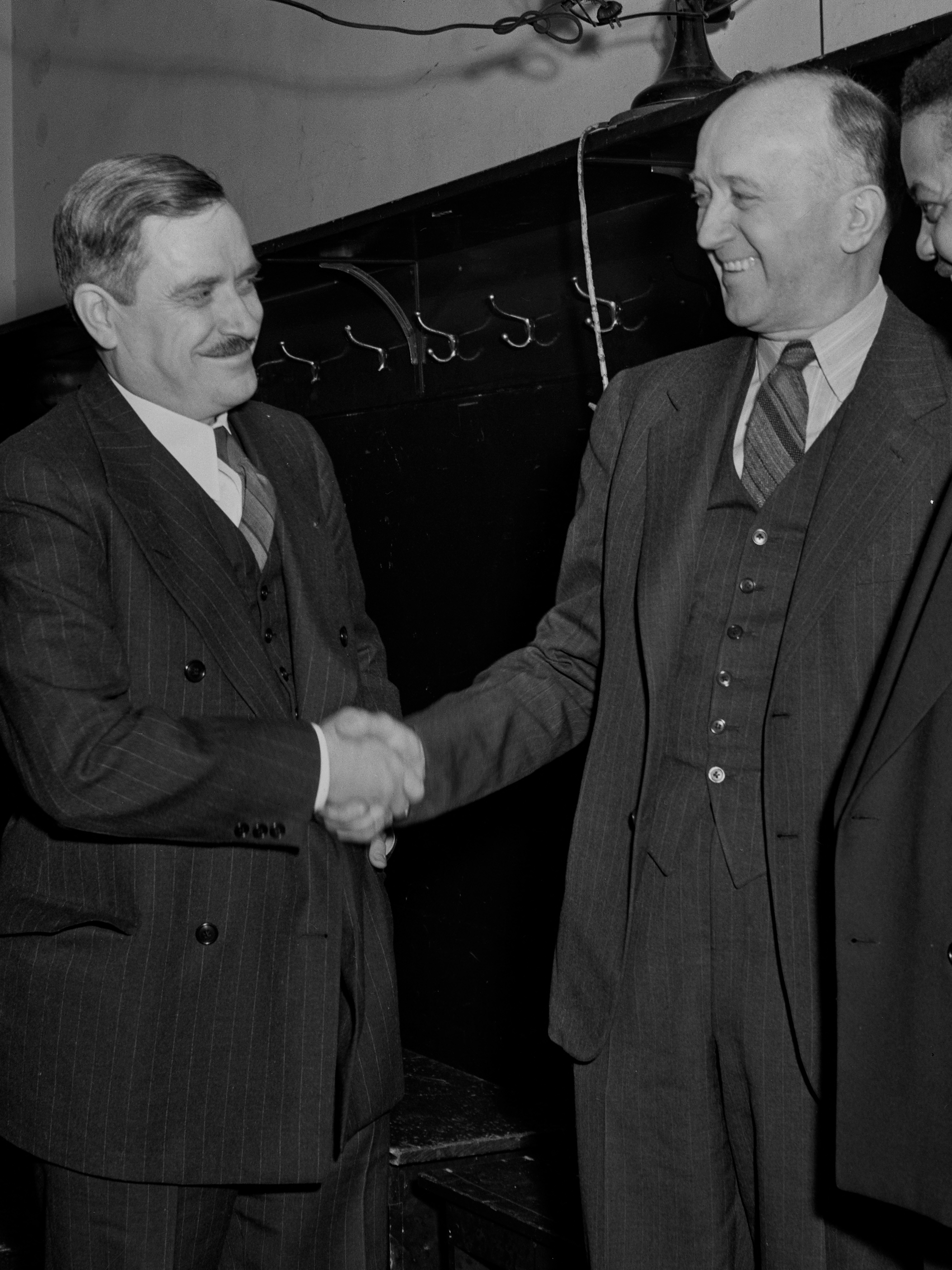
Foster (right) shakes hands with Earl Browder at the former's birthday celebration, March 18, 1941

After the Communist Party USA (CPUSA)'s (Note: The Workers (Communist) Party became the Communist Party USA (CPUSA) in 1929.) convention in 1930, Foster was arrested and charged, without evidence, with felony assault. Because of his subsequent imprisonment, he became increasingly disconnected from party activities. Despite this, he ran for Governor of New York on the Communist ticket that year.

Foster was nominated for president for the third time in 1932 (he had been nominated previously in 1924 and 1928), but he suffered a heart attack on the campaign trail and was forced to step down as leader of the party in favor of Earl Browder. Sent to the Soviet Union for treatment, Foster's condition only grew worse. A period followed in which Foster was separated from political activity.

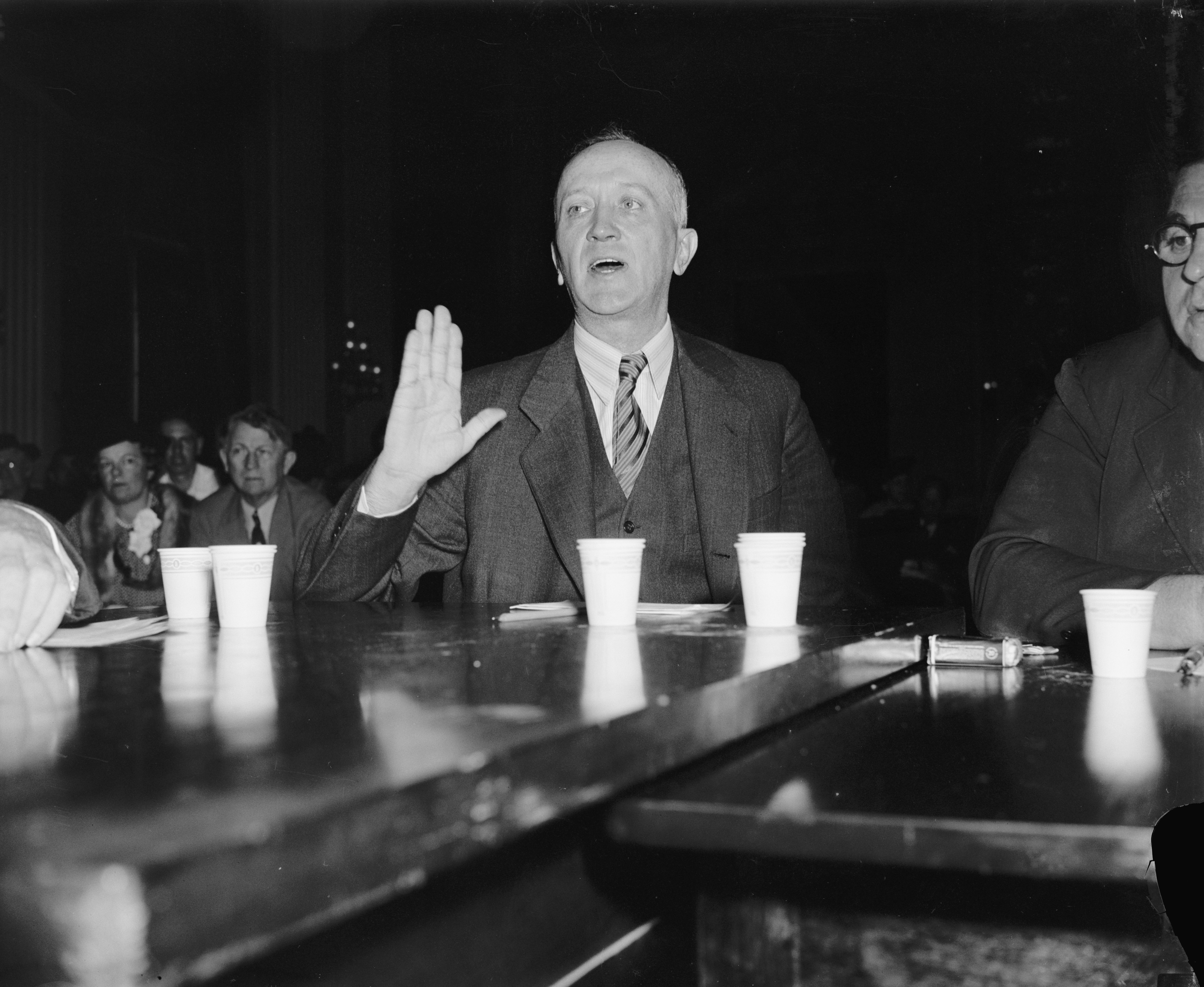
Foster testifies before the Dies Committee, September 29, 1939

Foster returned to politics late in 1935, but he became a more marginal figure in the party. In the meantime, a small-scale personality cult developed around Browder as he became a supporter of the New Deal and, to a lesser extent, the Roosevelt administration. Foster was critical of both. As a result, he became the "loyal opposition" to Browder within the CPUSA.

=== Second return to power ===
In 1944, believing that the alliance between the United States and the Soviet Union would be permanent and that a Communist revolution was unlikely in the near future, Browder dissolved the CPUSA and replaced it with the Communist Political Association (CPA)—envisioned as a Marxist advocacy group within Roosevelt's New Deal coalition rather than a traditional Communist party. Foster opposed this move, but he initially opted not to openly challenge Browder out of fear that he would be expelled from the party. However, in 1945, the relationship between the United States and the Soviet Union became strained, and in January of that year, Foster drafted a letter to other American Communist leaders criticizing Browder's strategy.

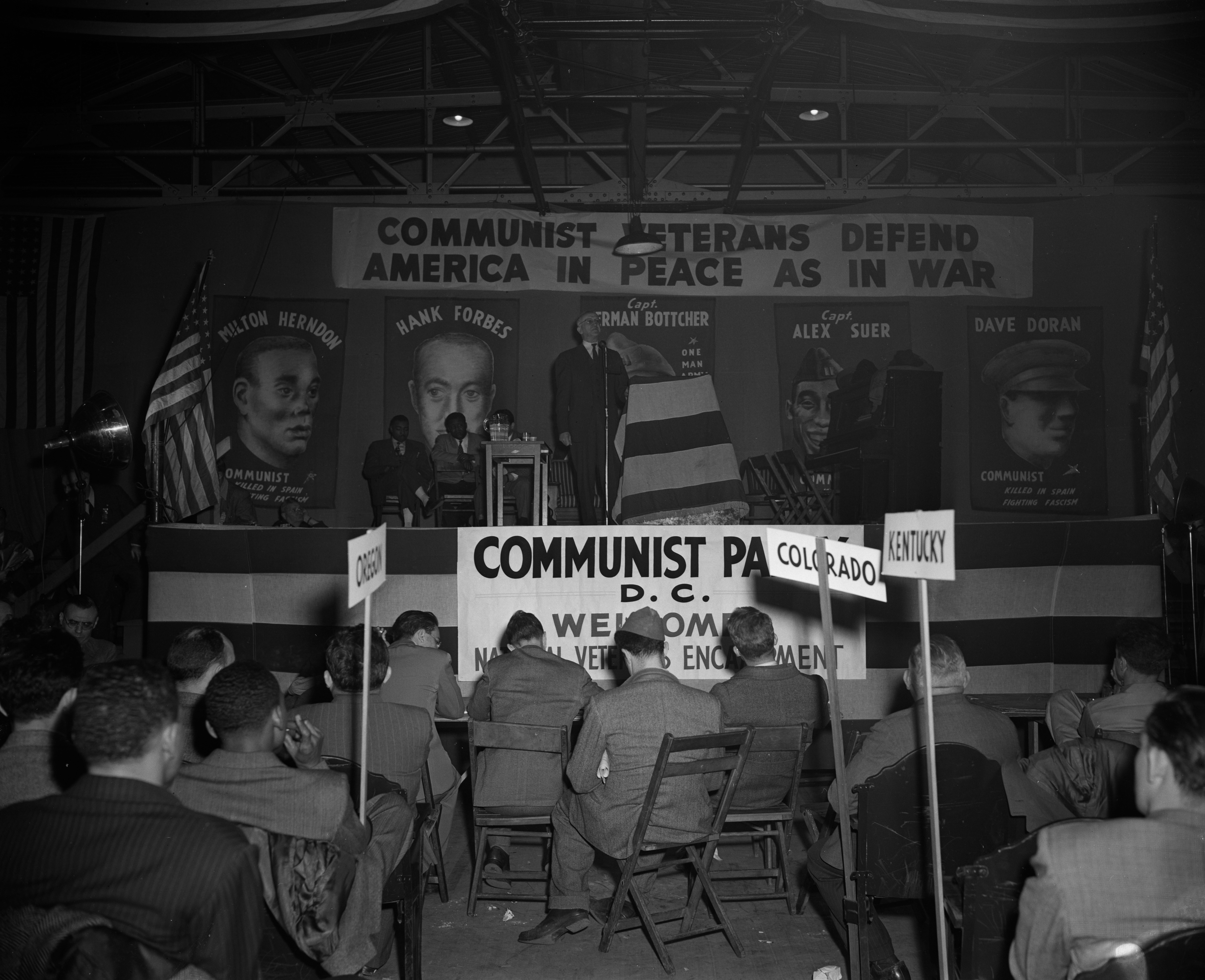
Foster addresses the National Communist Veterans Encampment at Turner's Arena in Washington, D.C., May 8, 1947

Foster's letter subsequently influenced an article by Jacques Duclos, the leader of the French Communist Party. This article denounced Browder, arguing that his analysis represented a revisionist interpretation of Marxism. After the article's publication, American Communist leaders also criticized Browder, calling him a class traitor. At an emergency CPA convention in July 1945, the CPA was reconstituted as the CPUSA, Browder was expelled, and a new leadership consisting of Foster, Eugene Dennis, and John Williamson was elected.

The party campaigned vigorously for third-party candidate Henry A. Wallace in the 1948 United States presidential election. However, this effort failed to produce a viable Progressive Party, which was its aim, and Wallace suffered a major defeat. The failure of this campaign and the onset of the Cold War contributed to a disastrous situation for Communist-affiliated unions and union leaders within the CIO, many of which were expelled.

=== Smith Act trials ===
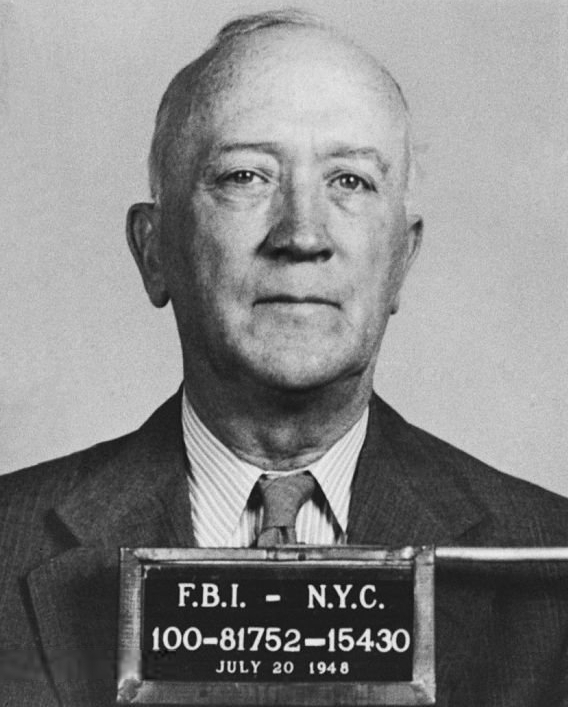
Foster's FBI mugshot, 1948

In 1948 Foster was among the party leaders indicted for subversive activity under the Smith Act, but, because of his precarious health, he was not brought to trial. The party began to implode as a result of these prosecutions. Many party leaders went underground after the Supreme Court upheld the convictions of the first tier of CPUSA leaders in Dennis v. United States, 341 U.S. 494 (1951). Foster also presided over a number of internal purges.

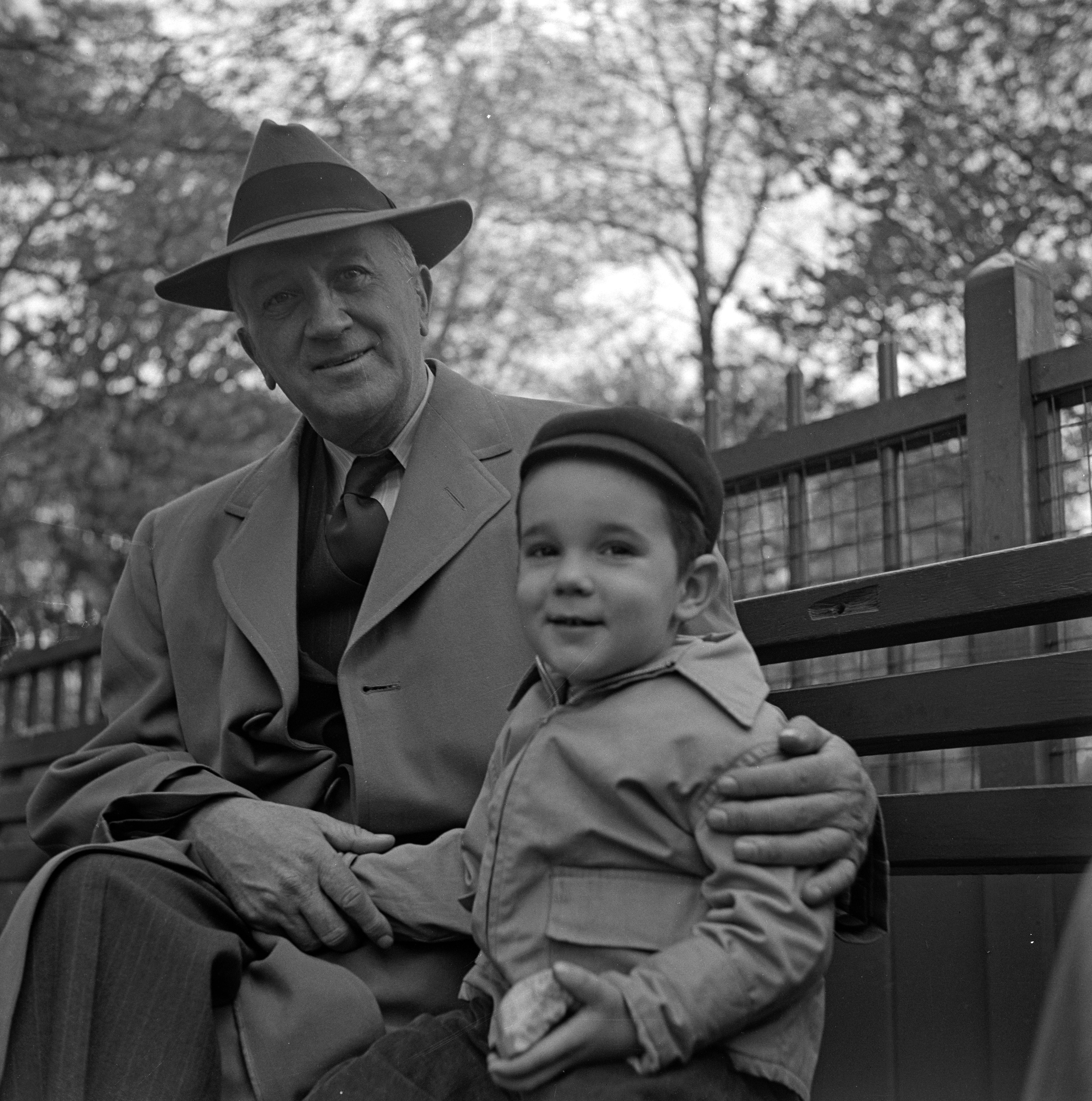
Foster and his grandson Butch c. 1949

After Stalin's death and subsequent denunciation by Nikita Khrushchev at the 1956 Twentieth Party Congress, Foster joined Khrushchev in condemning the former Soviet leader. When, under Khrushchev's leadership, the Soviet Union intervened in Hungary, Foster opposed a party resolution criticizing the move. However, the intervention sparked the growth of a reform faction within the party. At the party's 1957 convention, this faction almost removed Foster from leadership. While he remained on the National Board and was appointed "chairman emeritus"—an honorary title—his health began to decline soon after. In 1960, he traveled to the Soviet Union for treatment. Gus Hall was made party leader in his absence.

== Death and legacy ==
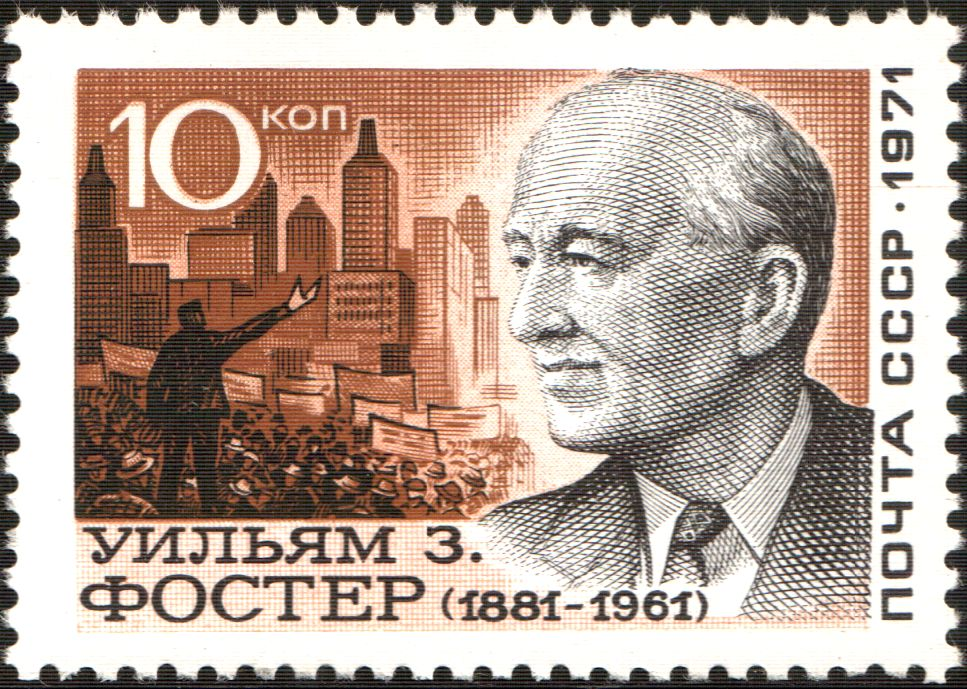
Foster and a meeting of workers in New York on a Soviet stamp, 1971

Foster died on September 1, 1961, in Moscow. The Soviet Union gave him a state funeral in Red Square and Khrushchev personally headed the honor guard. His ashes were interred with John Reed and Bill Haywood. His book Toward Soviet America remains a favorite among American communists and has been continuously republished by both leftists and anti-communists, with the latter seeing it as scandalous. One edition of the book was published with the subtitle "The Book the Communists Tried to Destroy!" Many biographies of Foster have been published by American academics and historians.

The founding documents of the Progressive Labor Party portrayed Foster as representing the best side of the Communist Party while blaming reformist and revisionist tendencies on Earl Browder. Many of the groups of the 1970s New Communist Movement eulogized and upheld Foster as an icon. The American Party of Labor claims descent from Foster and his secretary and aide, Jack Shulman.

== Works ==
=== Books and pamphlets ===
- Insurgency: or, the economic power of the middle class (with Hermon Titus), Seattle, Wash: Trustee Print. Co., 1910.
- Syndicalism (with Earl Ford), Chicago, IL: W.Z. Foster, 1913.
- Trade Unionism: The Road to Freedom, Chicago, IL: International Trade Union Educational League, 1916.
- General Report on Steel Strike Relief Fund, Pittsburgh, PA: National Committee for Organizing Iron and Steel Workers, 1920.
- The Great Steel Strike and Its Lessons, New York: B. W. Huebsch, 1920.
- The Railroaders' Next Step — Amalgamation, Chicago, IL: Trade Union Educational League, 1922.
- The Russian Revolution, Chicago, IL: Trade Union Educational League, 1922.
- The Revolutionary Crisis of 1918-1921: In Germany, England, Italy and France, Chicago, IL: Trade Union Educational League, 1922.
- The Bankruptcy of the American Labor Movement, Chicago, IL: Trade Union Educational League, 1922.
- The Principles and Program of the Trade Union Educational League, Chicago, IL: Trade Union Educational League, 1922.
- Russia in 1924, Chicago, IL: Trade Union Educational League, 1924.
- Russian workers and workshops in 1926, Chicago, IL: Trade Union Educational League, 1926.
- Organize the Unorganized, Chicago, IL: Trade Union Educational League, 1926.
- Strike Strategy, Chicago, IL.: Trade Union Educational League, 1926 (Labor Herald Library #18) alternate link
- Misleaders of Labor, Chicago, IL: Trade Union Educational League, 1927.
- The Watson-Parker law, the latest scheme to hamstring railroad unionism, Chicago, IL.: Trade Union Educational League, 1927 (Labor Herald Library #19).
- Wrecking the labor banks; the collapse of the labor banks and investment companies of the Brotherhood of locomotive engineers. Chicago, IL: Trade Union Educational League, 1927.
- Victorious socialist construction in the Soviet Union, New York: Trade Union Unity League, 1930.
- Fight against hunger, New York: Workers' Library Publishers, 1930.
- Little brothers of the big labor fakers: report of a speech against the Conference for Progressive Labor Action, made in New Star Casino, New York City on May 10, 1931, New York: Trade Union Unity League, 1931.
- The words and deeds of Franklin D. Roosevelt, New York: Workers' Library Publishers, 1932.
- Toward Soviet America, New York: Coward-McCann, Inc, 1932.
- Industrial unionism, New York: Workers' Library Publishers, 1936.
- The crisis in the Socialist party, New York: Workers' Library Publishers, 1936.
- Unionizing steel, New York: Workers' Library Publishers, 1936.
- Organizing methods in the steel industry, New York: Workers' Library Publishers, 1936.
- Questions and answers on the Piatakov-Radek trial, New York: Workers' Library Publishers, 1937.
- What means a strike in steel, New York: Workers' Library Publishers, 1937.
- A manual of industrial unionism, organizational structure and policies, New York: Workers' Library Publishers, 1937.
- Railroad workers forward!, New York: Workers' Library Publishers, 1937.
- From Bryan to Stalin, New York: International Publishers, 1937.
- Halt the railroad wage-cut, New York: Workers' Library Publishers, 1938.
- The revolutionary and socialist traditions of American labor, Minneapolis, Minn.: Minnesota State Committee, Communist Party U.S.A., 1938.
- Stop wage-cuts & layoffs on the railroads; a reply to President T.C. Cashen of the Switchmen's Union of North America, New York: Workers' Library Publishers, 1938.
- Your questions answered on politics, peace, economics anti-semitism, race prejudice, religion, trade unionism, Americanism, democracy, socialism, communism, New York: Workers' Library Publishers, June 1939.
- Pages from a Worker's Life, New York: International Publishers, 1939.
- The war crisis: questions and answers, New York: Workers' Library Publishers, January 1940.
- Capitalism, socialism, and the war, New York: Workers' Library Publishers, June 1940.
- What's what about the war; questions and answers, New York: Workers' Library Publishers, July 1940.
- The United States and the Soviet Union, New York: Workers' Library Publishers, December 1940.
- Roosevelt heads for war, New York: Workers' Library Publishers, 1940.
- Socialism: the road to peace, prosperity and freedom New York: Workers' Library Publishers 1941 "Published on the occasion of the sixtieth anniversary celebration of William Z. Foster".
- Communism versus fascism; a reply to those who lump together the social systems of the Soviet Union and Nazi Germany, New York: Workers' Library Publishers, 1941.
- The Soviet Union: friend and ally of the American people, New York: Workers' Library Publishers, October 1941.
- Defend America by smashing Hitlerism, New York: Workers' Library Publishers, 1941.
- World capitalism and world socialism, New York: Workers' Library Publishers, 1941.
- The railroad workers and the War, New York: Workers' Library Publishers, 1941.
- Labor and the war, New York, Workers Library Publishers, January 1942. alternate link
- Steel workers and the war, New York: Workers' Library Publishers, 1942.
- The trade unions and the war, New York: Workers' Library Publishers, 1942.
- American democracy and the war, New York: Workers' Library Publishers, 1942.
- Smash Hitler's spring offensive now!, New York: Workers' Library Publishers, 1942.
- The U.S.A. and the U.S.S.R., war allies and friends, New York: Workers' Library Publishers, 1942.
- From defense to attack: the United Nations seize the initiative, New York: Workers' Library Publishers, 1942.
- The People and the Congress, New York: Workers' Library Publishers, February 1943.
- For speedy victory: The second front now, New York: Workers' Library Publishers, October 1943.
- Soviet democracy and the war, New York: Workers' Library Publishers, December 1943.
- The Soviet trade unions and allied labor unity, New York: Workers' Library Publishers, 1943.
- Organized labor faces the new world, New York: New Century Publishers March 1945.
- The strike situation, and organized labor's wage and job strategy, New York: New Century Publishers, 1945 (with cartoons by Hugo Gellert and William Gropper).
- The coal miners, their problems in war and peace, New York: New Century Publishers, 1945.
- The Rankin witch hunt, New York: New Century Publishers, 1945.
- Reaction beats its war drums, New York: New Century Publishers, 1946.
- The menace of a new world war, New York: New Century Publishers, 1946.
- Palestine: problem and solution, New York: Issued by Communist Party, New York State, 1946.
- Our country needs a strong Communist Party, New York: New Century Publishers, 1946.
- Problems of organized labor today, New York: New Century Publishers, 1946.
- A message to America's coal miners, New York: Communist Party, U.S.A., 1947.
- Quarantine the warmongers, New York: New Century Publishers, November 1947.
- Workers, defend your unions!, New York: New Century Publishers, 1947.
- Organized labor and the Fascist danger, New York: New Century Publishers, 1947.
- The meaning of the 9-party Communist conference, New York: New Century Publishers, 1947.
- The New Europe, New York: International Publishers 1947.
- American Trade Unionism: Principles and Organization, Strategy and Tactics, New York: International Publishers, 1947.
- Beware of the war danger!: stop, look and listen!, New York: New Century Publishers, 1948.
- Radio address by William Z. Foster, delivered at Madison Square Garden, August 2, 1948, New York: Communist Party, U.S.A., 1948.
- On improving the Party's work among women New York: New Century Publishers, 1948.
- Danger ahead for organized labor, New York: New Century Publishers, 1948.
- Labor and the Marshall plan, New York: New Century Publishers, March 1948.
- The crime of El Fanguito: an open letter to President Truman on Puerto Rico, New York: New Century Publishers, 1948.
- N.Y. Herald Tribune's 23 questions about the Communist Party answered by William Z. Foster, New York: New Century Publishers, 1948.
- The Economic Crisis and the Cold War: Reports Presented to a Conference on 'Managed Economy,' the 'Cold War,' and the Developing Economic Crisis, New York: New Century Publishers, 1949.
- In defense of the Communist Party and the indicted leaders, New York: New Century Publishers, 1949.
- The Twilight of World Capitalism, New York: International Publishers, 1949.
- Outline Political History of the Americas, New York: International Publishers, 1951.
- A letter to Congress: defeat the anti-labor Smith Bill!, New York: New Century Publishers, 1952.
- The steel workers and the fight for labor's rights, New York: New Century Publishers, 1952.
- History of the Communist Party of the United States, New York: International Publishers, 1952.
- Danger signals for organized labor, New York: New Century Publishers, 1953.
- The Negro People in American History, New York: International Publishers, 1954.
- History of the three Internationals; the world socialist and communist movements from 1848 to the present, New York: International Publishers, 1955.
- Outline History of the World Trade Union Movement, New York: International Publishers, 1956.
- The Historic Advance of World Socialism, New York: International Publishers, 1960.
- More pages from a worker's life edited and with an Introduction by Arthur Zipser. AIMS Occasional paper #32. New York: American Institute for Marxist Studies, 1979.

=== Introductions, articles, contributions, etc. ===
- "The Socialist and Syndicalist Movements in France", Industrial Worker, vol. 3, no. 1, whole 105 (March 23, 1911), pp. 1, 4.
- Trade Unions in America (with James P. Cannon and Earl Browder), Chicago, Ill.: Published for the Trade Union Educational League by the Daily Worker 1925 (Little red library #1).
- Acceptance Speeches (with Benjamin Gitlow), New York: Workers Library Publishers, 1928; accepting the party's presidential nomination.
- Foster and Ford for Food and Freedom: Acceptance Speeches of William Z. Foster and James W. Ford, Communist Candidates for President and Vice-President of the United States of America (with James W. Ford), New York: Workers' Library Publishers, 1932.
- Technocracy and Marxism. (with Earl Browder and Vyacheslav Molotov), New York: Workers' Library Publishers, 1933.
- Get Wise—Organize: What Every Young Steel Worker Should Know, New York: National Committee of the Young Communist League, 1937.
- Party Building and Political Leadership (with several others), New York: Workers Library Publishers, 1937.
- Letters from Spain by Joe Dallet, American volunteer, to his wife; introductory articles by William Z. Foster, New York: Workers Library Publishers, 1938.
- The meaning of the Soviet trials, by E. Yaroslavsky, including the official text of the indictment of the Bukharin-Trotskyite bloc. Introduction by William Z. Foster, New York: Workers Library Publishers, 1938.
- The Path of Browder and Foster (with others), New York: Workers' Library Publishers, 1941.
- The Fight Against Hitlerism (with Robert Minor), New York: Workers Library Publishers, 1941.
- Speed the Second Front (with Browder, Israel Amter and Max Weiss), New York: Workers Library Publishers, 1942.
- America at the Crossroads: Postwar Problems and Communist Policy by Eugene Dennis (foreword), New York: New Century Publishers, 1945.
- The Menace of American Imperialism (with Eugene Dennis), New York: New Century Publishers, 1945.
- Marxism-Leninism vs. Revisionism (with others), New York: New Century Publishers, 1946.
- On the struggle against revisionism New York: National Veterans Committee of the Communist Party, 1946.
- Are communism and democracy mutually antagonistic? Washington, Ransdell, 1946 (Panel Discussion with Clare Boothe Luce, William Henry Chamberlin and Harry F. Ward; moderated by Theodore Granik).
- The Communist position on the Negro question, New York: New Century Publishers, 1947.
- An Open Letter to All Members of the Communist Party (with Eugene Dennis and Henry Winston), New York: Communist Party, U.S.A., 1948.
- The case of Puerto Rico: memorandum to the United Nations by the Communist Party of Puerto Rico (intro), New York: New Century Publishers, 1953.
- Marxism vs Keynesism (with Celeste Strack and John Eaton), Los Angeles, CA: Progressive Book Shop, 1955.

== See also ==
- Communists in the U.S. Labor Movement (1919-1937)
- Communists in the U.S. Labor Movement (1937-1950)
- Industrial Workers of the World
- The Communist Party and African-Americans
- History of the Communist Party in America
- American Communist Party
- Toward Soviet America
- From Bryan to Stalin

== Sources ==
- Barrett, James R. (1990). Work and Community in the Jungle: Chicago's Packinghouse Workers, 1894-1922. Urbana: University of Illinois Press. ISBN 0-252-06136-5.
- Barrett, James R. (1994). "William Z. Foster". In Buhle, Mari Jo; Buhle, Paul; Kaye, Harvey J. (eds.). The American Radical. New York: Routledge. pp. 197–203. ISBN 0-415-90803-5.
- Barrett, James R. (1999). William Z. Foster and the Tragedy of American Radicalism. Urbana; Chicago: University of Illinois Press. ISBN 0-252-02046-4.
- Brenner, Aaron; Day, Benjamin; Ness, Immanuel, eds. (2009). The Encyclopedia of Strikes in American History. New York: M.E. Sharpe. ISBN 978-0-7656-1330-1.
  - Goldberg, David J. "Twentith-Century Textile Strikes". In Brenner, Day & Ness (2009), pp. 330-341.
  - Le Blanc, Paul. "Garment Worker Strikes". In Brenner, Day & Ness (2009), pp. 342-350.
  - Gabriel, Jackie S. "Unionizing the 'Jungle': A Century of Meatpacking Strikes". In Brenner, Day & Ness (2009), pp. 375-388.
- Brody, David (1965). Labor in Crisis: The Steel Strike of 1919. Philadelphia; New York: J. B. Lippincott Company.
- Brown, Cliff (1998). Racial Conflict and Violence in the Labor Market: Roots in the 1919 Steel Strike. New York: Routledge. ISBN 0-8153-3176-2.
- Davenport, Tim (2018). "The Organisational Roots of Jay Lovestone's Communist Party Opposition". In Le Blanc, Paul; Davenport, Tim (eds.). The American Exceptionalism of Jay Lovestone and His Comrades, 1929-1940. Haymarket Books. ISBN 978-1-60846-756-3.
- Devinatz, Victor G. (1996). "The Labor Philosophy of William Z. Foster: From the IWW to the TUEL". International Social Science Review. 71 (1/2): 3–13. ISSN 0278-2308. JSTOR 41882191.
- Devinatz, Victor G. (2019). "The CPUSA's Trade Unionism during Third Period Communism, 1929–1934". American Communist History. 18 (3–4): 251–268. doi:10.1080/14743892.2019.1608710. ISSN 1474-3892.
- Dorrien, Gary J. (2021). American Democratic Socialism: History, Politics, Religion, and Theory. New Haven; London: Yale University Press. ISBN 978-0-300-25376-4.
- Foner, Philip S. (1991). History of the Labor Movement in the United States. Vol. 9: The T.U.E.L. to the End of the Gompers Era. ISBN 0-7178-0092-X.
- Halpern, Rick (1992). "Race, Ethnicity, and Union in the Chicago Stockyards, 1917–1922". International Review of Social History. 37 (1): 25–58. doi:10.1017/S0020859000110922. ISSN 0020-8590.
- Haynes, John Earl (2025). van Dijk, Ruud; Brennan, Sean (eds.). "Communist Party of the United States". Routledge Resources Online. Routledge. doi:10.4324/9780367199838-recw113-1.
- Holmes, John (2007). "American Jewish Communism and Garment Unionism in the 1920s". American Communist History. 6 (2): 171–195. doi:10.1080/14743890701645266. ISSN 1474-3892.
- Morris, Joshua (2022). The Many Worlds of American Communism. London: Lexington Books. ISBN 978-1-7936-3196-1.
- Johanningsmeier, Edward P. (2014). Forging American Communism: The Life of William Z. Foster. Princeton University Press. pp. 37–38. ISBN 978-1-4008-6367-9.
- Patrick, Kevin J. (2010). "Joe Magarac and the Spirit of Pittsburgh". In Scarpaci, Joseph L. (ed.). Pittsburgh and the Appalachians: Cultural and Natural Resources in a Postindustrial Age. Pittsburgh: University of Pittsburgh Press. pp. 53–63. ISBN 978-0-8229-7104-7.
- Reed, Chistopher R. (2018). "The Great Migration in Context: The Chicago Experience, 1916–1918". The Oxford Research Encyclopedia of American History. Oxford University Press.
- Sakmyster, Thomas (2012). A Communist Odyssey: The Life of József Pogány / John Pepper. Central European University Press. ISBN 978-615-5225-08-6.
- Singer, Alan (1991). "Communists and Coal Miners: Rank-and-File Organizing in the United Mine Workers of America during the 1920s". Science & Society. 55 (2): 132–157. ISSN 0036-8237. JSTOR 40403132.
- Zipser, Arthur (1981). Workingclass Giant: The Life of William Z. Foster. New York: International Publishers. ISBN 0-7178-0590-5.
- Zumoff, Jacob A. (2021). The Red Thread: the Passaic Textile Strike. New Brunswick: Rutgers University Press. ISBN 978-1-9788-0993-2.

Party political offices
Preceded by James P. Cannon	Chairman of the Communist Party USA; 1924-1957	Succeeded by William L. Patterson
Preceded by —	Communist Party USA Presidential candidate 1924 (lost), 1928 (lost), 1932 (lost)	Succeeded by Earl Browder
