= Trade Union Educational League =

Former trade union of the United States

- Abbreviation: TUEL
- Founders: William Z. Foster
- Founded: 1920; 106 years ago
- Dissolved: 1929; 97 years ago
- Succeeded by: Trade Union Unity League
- Ideology: Boring from within
- Political position: Far-left
- International affiliation: Profintern

March 1923 issue of The Labor Herald, official organ of the Trade Union Educational League.

The Trade Union Educational League (TUEL) was established by William Z. Foster in 1920 (through 1928) as a means of uniting radicals within various trade unions for a common plan of action. The group was subsidized by the Communist International via the Workers (Communist) Party of America from 1922. The organization did not collect membership dues but instead ostensibly sought to both fund itself and to spread its ideas through the sale of pamphlets and circulation of a monthly magazine.

After several years of initial success, the group was marginalized by the unions of the American Federation of Labor, which objected to its strategy of "boring from within" existing unions in order to depose sitting union leaderships. In 1929 the organization was transformed into the Trade Union Unity League (TUUL), which sought to establish radical dual unions in competition with existing labor organizations.

== Organizational history ==
=== Origins ===
The Trade Union Educational League (TUEL) was founded in Chicago in November 1920 by William Foster and a handful of close associates hailing from the radical movement. The group was very nearly stillborn, counting only about two dozen active members at its outset, including left wing Socialists, Communists, and former Wobblies. Shortly after the tiny group was called into being, Foster departed for Soviet Russia, ostensibly as a correspondent for the Federated Press news service, but actually to attend the Founding Congress of the Red International of Labor Unions (RILU), best known by its contracted Russian name, "Profintern."

The trip would prove to be important, as the former syndicalist Foster came to closely identify with the Bolshevik Revolution and its tactics.

After returning from Soviet Russia in 1921, quietly joined the underground Communist Party of America. He compiled his Russian journalism written for the Federated Press into a book called "The Russian Revolution" and set about touring the country lecturing on behalf of the Friends of Soviet Russia and acting as a fundraiser for Russian famine relief.

According to Foster's account, TUEL preexisted as an independent organization and "upon my return to the United States I had a meeting with the Central Executive Committee of the Communist Party, who agreed to support the work of the Trade Union Educational League." Foster stated that "the League is not an organic section of the Party but is simply endorsed by it."

=== Development ===
Foster's efforts to organize radical trade unionists through TUEL to remake the structure of the labor movement and to overthrow its existing leadership put him at odds with Samuel Gompers, head of the American Federation of Labor. Historians Peter J. Albert and Grace Palladino have summarized the situation in this manner:

"The forty-one year old [Foster] was everything Gompers was not. He embraced Communism and the Red International of Labor Unions, or Profintern (RILU), advocated independent working-class political action, and believed that the AFL would have to function as a strong, centralized organization if it hoped to survive and grow. Whereas Gompers presumed that the great mass of workers would learn the value of solidarity through direct experience, Foster and his supporters favored a more top-down approach.... With amalgamation as its slogan, industrial unionism as its goal, and 'boring from within' the established trade unions as its method, the TUEL promised to transform otherwise 'timid and muddled' AFL affiliates into 'scientifically constructed, class conscious weapons in the revolutionary struggle.'"

In defending the existing system from what he perceived as a Moscow-directed attack, Gompers availed himself of every opportunity to question Foster's motives and emphasize his close personal connection with the American Communist movement.

=== Structure ===
The TUEL did not have formal membership rolls or paid dues. No membership cards were issued. The organization instead supported itself through sales of pamphlets and magazines and through an unpublicized subsidy by the Communist International by way of the Workers (Communist) Party.

Consequently, the size of the de facto membership of the organization is difficult to gauge. Historian Ralph Darlington notes that while TUEL declared a circulation for its publications of from 10,000 to 15,000, in fact the group only had "about 500 hard-core activists" at the time of its greatest strength during the first years of the 1920s.

=== Transformation of the organization ===
In 1928, as a byproduct of the Third Period ultra-radicalism of the Communist International, the TUEL was transformed into the Trade Union Unity League (TUUL), a federation of industrial unions established in opposition to the American Federation of Labor craft labor unions. Even though this change of tactics met a refutation of William Z. Foster's long-held strategy of "boring from within" the existing trade unions, in favor of "dual unionism," Foster nevertheless continued to remain loyal to the new TUUL organization.

== Conferences ==
| Conference | Location | Date | Attendees |
|---|---|---|---|
| First | Chicago | August 26–27, 1922 | Attended by 45 delegates from 26 cities, included 4 from Canada. Raided by police. See May 1923 issue of The Labor Herald for Foster's account of the trial. |
| Second | Chicago | September 1–2, 1923 | Attended by 143 delegates representing 90 cities, including 3 from Canada and 1 from Mexico Proceedings published in October 1923 issue of The Labor Herald. |
| Third | New York | December 3–4, 1927 | Attended by 297 delegates, 107 from the needle trades |
| Fourth | Cleveland | August 31-September 1, 1929 | 690 delegates; including 322 from recently organized NMU, NTWU and NTWIU; transform TUEL into Trade Union Unity League |

== Publications ==
- William Z. Foster, The Railroaders' Next Step. Chicago: Trade Union Educational League, 1921. Labor Herald Library #1. Revised edition published as The Railroaders' Next Step: Amalgamation.
- William Z. Foster, The Russian Revolution. Chicago: Trade Union Educational League, 1921. Labor Herald Library #2.
- William Z. Foster, The Revolutionary Crisis of 1918-1921: in Germany, England, Italy and France. Chicago: Trade Union Educational League, 1921. Labor Herald Library #3.
- William Z. Foster, The Bankruptcy of the American Labor Movement. Chicago: Trade Union Educational League, 1921. Labor Herald Library #4.
- The Principles and Program of the Trade Union Educational League. Chicago: Trade Union Educational League, 1922.
- Jay Fox, Amalgamation. Chicago: Trade Union Educational League, 1923. Labor Herald Library #5.
- Resolutions and Decisions: Second World Congress of the Red International of Labor Unions Held in Moscow, November 1922. Chicago: Trade Union Educational League, 1922. Labor Herald Library #6.
- Mikhail Tomsky, The Russian Trade Unions in 1923. Chicago: Trade Union Educational League, 1922. Labor Herald Library #7.
- Earl Browder and Andrés Nin, Struggle of the Trade Unions against Fascism. Chicago: Trade Union Educational League, 1923. Labor Herald Library #8.
- William F. Dunne, William F. Dunne's Speech at the AF of L Convention, Portland, 1923. Chicago: Trade Union Educational League, n.d. [1923]. Labor Herald Library #9.
- A. Losovsky, The World's Trade Union Movement. by Chicago: Trade Union Educational League, 1924. Labor Herald Library #10.
- William Z. Foster, Russia in 1924. Chicago: Trade Union Educational League, 1924. Labor Herald Library #11.
- Resolutions and Decisions: Third World Congress of the Red International of Labor Unions, Held in Moscow, July, 1924. Chicago: Trade Union Educational League, 1924. Labor Herald Library #12.
- A. Losovsky, Lenin, the Great Strategist of the Class War. Chicago: Trade Union Educational League, 1924. Labor Herald Library #13.
- A. Losovsky, Lenin and the Trade Union Movement. Chicago: Trade Union Educational League, 1924. Labor Herald Library #14.
- Tim Buck, Steps to Power: A Program of Action for the Trade Union Minority of Canada. Toronto: Trade Union Educational League, 1925.
- William Z. Foster, Earl Browder and James Cannon Trade unions in America by Chicago, Ill.: Published for the Trade Union Educational League by the Daily Worker 1925 (Little red library #1) alternate link
- Robert W. Dunn, American Company Unions: A Study of Employee Representation Plans, "Works Councils" and Other Substitutes for Labor Unions. Chicago: Trade Union Educational League, 1926. Labor Herald Library #15.
- William Z. Foster, Russian Workers and Workshops in 1926. Chicago: Trade Union Educational League, 1926. Labor Herald Library #16.
- William Z. Foster, Organize the Unorganized. Chicago: Trade Union Educational League, 1926. Labor Herald Library #17.
- William Z. Foster, Strike Strategy. Chicago: Trade Union Educational League, 1926. Labor Herald Library #18.
- A Fighting Union for the Needle Workers!: Program Adopted at a Conference of Delegates Representing the Progressive Members of the Following Needle Trades Unions: Amalgamated Clothing Workers, International Ladies Garment Workers, Furriers, Cap and Millinery Workers, United Hatters, Journeymen Tailors, United Garment Workers. New York: The Needle Trades Section of the Trade Union Educational League, 1926.
- William Z. Foster, The Watson-Parker Law: The Latest Scheme to Hamstring Railroad Unionism. Chicago: Trade Union Educational League, 1927. Labor Herald Library #19.
- William Z. Foster, Wrecking the Labor Banks: The Collapse of the Labor Banks and Investment Companies of the Brotherhood of Locomotive Engineers. Chicago: Trade Union Educational League, 1927. Labor Herald Library #20.
- William Z. Foster, Misleaders of Labor. Chicago: Trade Union Educational League, 1927.
- Save the Miners Union from the Coal Operators and the Corrupt Lewis Machine: Program Adopted by the National Save the Miners' Union Conference, April 1, 1928, Pittsburgh, Pa. n.c.: United Mine Workers of America, 1928.
- Program of the Trade Union Educational League New York: Trade Union Educational, 1928.
- Do You Want Higher Wages? Do You Want Shorter Working Hours? New York: Trade Union Educational League, 1929.

== See also ==
- Trade Union Unity League
- National Minority Movement
- Labor federation competition in the U.S.
