= International Trade Union Educational League =

The International Trade Union Educational League was a short lived organization led by William Z. Foster from 1915 to around 1917. It carried over some of the ideas of his former Syndicalist League of North America about boring from within existing trade unions, but had less radical rhetoric.

== History ==
A call was made for a national conference of Syndicalists in the final issue of the Kansas City Toiler to convene January 16–18, 1915 in Kansas City. However, the delegates assembled in St. Louis on January 17, for a one-day convention. The dozen delegates representing Chicago, St. Louis, Omaha and Kansas City voted to set up the International Trade Union Educational League, with its headquarters in Chicago. A National Board was elected consisting of representatives from each city. William Z. Foster was elected secretary. Though two periodicals apparently carried over from the SLNA, the San Diego International and the Omaha Unionist, it was decided that a new organ should be created for the organization and Max Dezetall, former editor of the Toiler, was eventually brought to Chicago to edit the groups Labor News. As for a programme, the meeting gave temporary endorsement to Syndicalism, a pamphlet that Foster and Earl Ford had written several years earlier, but commissioned Foster to write a new manifesto for the group.

Though manifestos were published that April by the Printing Workers Educational League of Seattle and the Railroad Workers Educational League, supposedly constituent parts of the group, Fosters pamphlet, Trade Unionism: the Road to Freedom, which appeared in fall 1915 was the "only formal statement of policy ever issued by the ITUEL. While still generally syndicalist, the new groups philosophy emphasized the inherently revolutionary and anti-capitalist nature of even mainstream unions; their tendency to demand more and more from capitalism as they grow stronger, and eventually "expropriate the capitalists and take command of society". Foster based this idea on the experience of the "Triple Alliance" of miners, railroaders and transportation workers in Great Britain.

Despite a 7,000 mile hobo trip west that winter, Foster couldn't establish any permanent groups outside of Chicago. The ITUEL group of about 100, however, became influential within the Chicago Federation of Labor. Its main strength was in the local Painters, Railway Carmen, Carpenters, Machinists, Barbers, Retail Clerks, Tailors, Ladies Garment workers, Metal polishers and Iron Moulders. Many members were officials within the local unions, Foster himself becoming District Organizer for the Chicago Railway Carmen. Other prominent members were Jack Johnstone, Joe Manley, J. A. Jones and Ed W. Rice.

Within the CFL the ITUEL made an "informal united front" with the John Fitzpatrick, Edward Nockels faction that had gained control of the federation from an allegedly gangster controlled buildings trade faction a few years earlier. ITUEL supported Fitzpatrick in support of the newly created independent Amalgamated Clothing Workers against the Gompers-backed United Garment Workers. They also worked with Fitzpatrick to secure CFL support for the creation of a Chicago Railroad Council, to be made up of all the local railroad. Fitzpatrick put Foster in charge of the CFLs campaign to free Tom Mooney and Warren K. Billings, and in March 1917, he organized rally in Chicago Coliseum with 17,000 attendants. They also worked to keep out or limit mob influence with the unions, such as the O'Donnel gang in the Barbers.

== Dissolution ==
However, while they support Fitzpatrick against Gompers and the Socialist Party, they were critical of Fitzpatricks continued adherence to the non-partisan labor policy of supporting labor friendly candidates on major party tickets. They also strongly disagreed with his support of a national eight-hours bill, believing that a general strike was the proper avenue of working class power, rather than legislation. The ITUEL developed a split on the issue of supporting Fitzpatrick, and Labor News, controlled by Dezettel, began to side with the Building Trades, Flat Janitors and Moving Picture Operators faction which was allied to organized crime. With the loss of Labor News the ITUEL disintegrated as a formal organization in the spring of 1917, and became "simply a scattering of influential militants meeting each other only occasionally in the course of their work in the unions.
