= James Eads How =

American hobo activist (1874–1930)

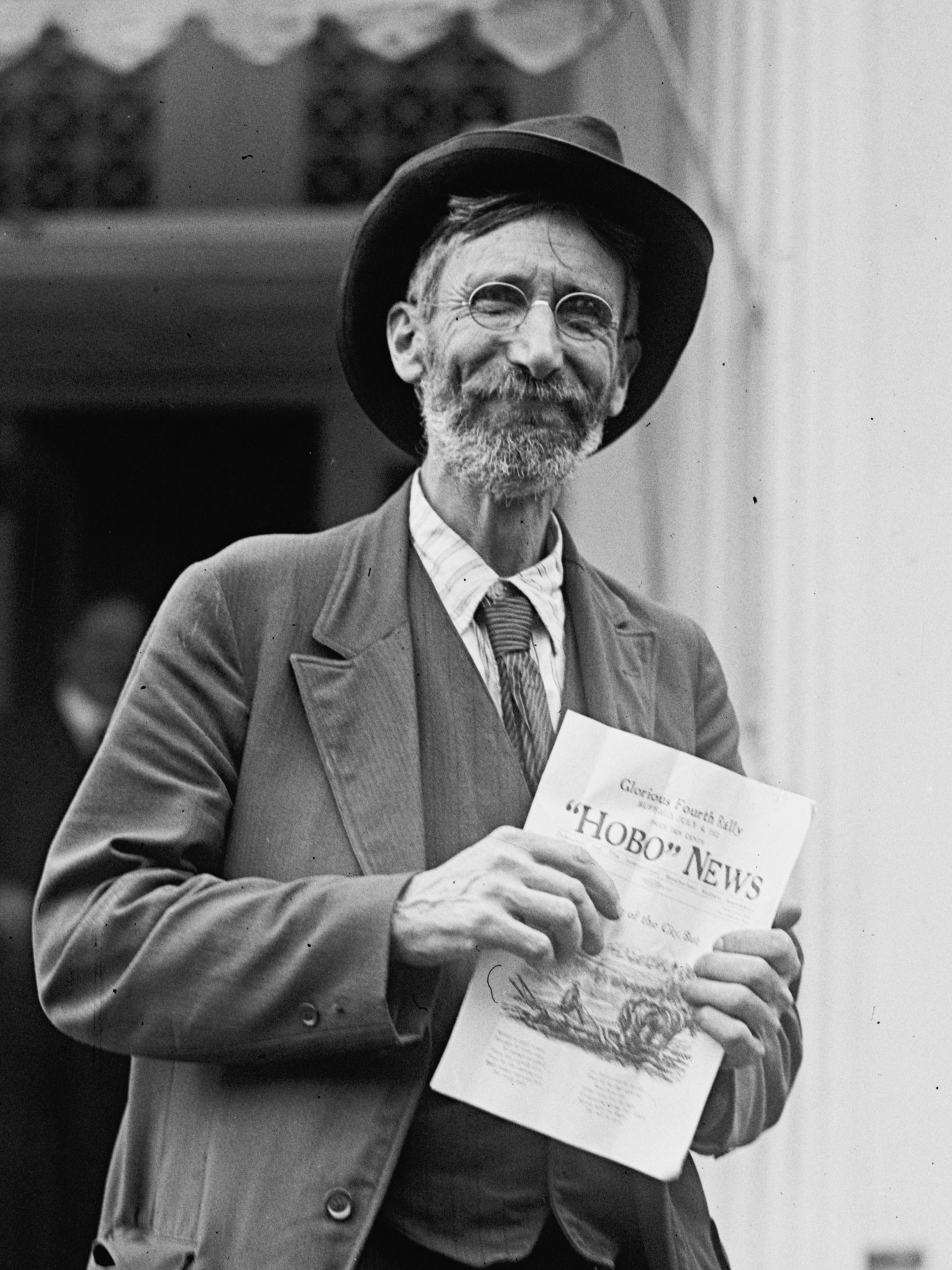
- Born: 1874
- Died: July 22, 1930; Staunton
- Education: Harvard University, Columbia University College of Physicians and Surgeons, University of Oxford
- Occupation: community organizer

James Eads How (1874 – July 22, 1930) was an American organizer of the hobo community in the early 20th century. He was heir of a wealthy St. Louis family but chose to live as a hobo and to help the homeless migrant workers. The newspapers often referred to him as the "Millionaire Hobo".

How was the founder, driving force, and financier of the International Brotherhood Welfare Association, a union for migrant workers which published Hobo News, and organized hobo colleges and hobo conventions.

== Early life ==
James Eads How's father was James Flintham How, vice president and general manager of the Wabash Railroad. His mother, Eliza Eads How, was the daughter of James Buchanan Eads, a successful civil engineer and inventor who had built the Eads Bridge. Even as a child he preferred a simple life without the servants his family could easily afford. How studied theology, first at Meadville Theological School, a Unitarian school in Meadville, Pennsylvania. There he was known as an eccentric because he donated much of his allowance to the poor and lived on the bare minimum. This was largely because of his religious conviction. How went to study at Harvard, where he tried but failed to found a monastic order, The Brotherhood of the Daily Life. He later went to Oxford and joined George Bernard Shaw's Fabian Society, at which time he also became a vegetarian (which he remained for the rest of his life). He then studied medicine at the College of Physicians & Surgeons in Manhattan but did not finish his medical degree.

== As a hobo and activist ==
James Eads How (center right) speaking to unemployed in Chicago, 1921

Ever since I reached the age of 20, I have realized that the tramps of this country are one of the biggest problems in our social life. They cannot be done away with until there is a change in the existing order of things, and their numbers are increasing every year. I am not a Socialist nor an Anarchist, but I do believe that the 'hobo' of this country is not getting a 'square deal.'

— James Eads How, to The New York Times in 1907.

How felt morally obligated to put his wealth to good use—going so far as to state of his fortune, "I have not earned it, it is not mine"—and he chose the homeless as the population he would dedicate his money and his life to organizing and advocating. He saw hobos as a class of people that was crucial to American industry but marginalized from society. Therefore, How spent most of his family estate and the tolls for Eads Bridge on his work with the homeless. How's vision came from the social ideas of Christian socialism and Social Gospel.

In addition to advocating for hobos, How chose to live as one, even though he had both money and education. He wore a shaggy beard and rough tramplike clothes. It was said that even ordinary hobos looked well dressed compared to How. From about age 25, he traveled around doing hard work for a living. One of How's contemporaries, sociologist Nels Anderson, describes how fully How immersed himself in the hobo lifestyle and how seriously How took his work:

Millionaire that he is, How has not failed to familiarize himself with every aspect of tramp life. He knows the life better than many of the veteran hobos. He has become so thoroughly absorbed in the work of what he describes as organizing the "migratory, casual, and unemployed"...workers that he practically loses interest in himself. He becomes obsessed with some task at times that he will walk the streets all day without stopping long enough to eat.

— Anderson, Nels, On Hobos and Homelessness, pp. 91–92.

=== International Brotherhood Welfare Association ===
Central to How's work was his brainchild, the International Brotherhood Welfare Association (IBWA), a sort of union for the hobos with headquarters in Cincinnati. Through the IBWA, How sponsored various hobo advocacy activities, including "hobo colleges", hobo journalism, and conventions. The media often ridiculed How and his many failed projects, calling him the "Millionaire Hobo" or "Millionaire Tramp", but it did not seem to discourage him.

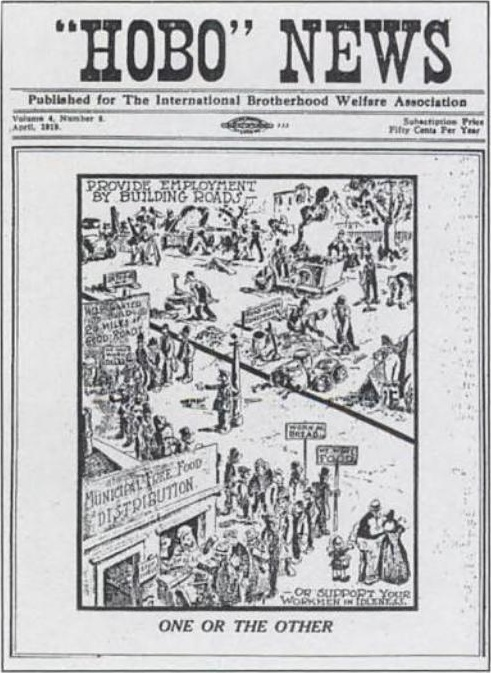
Late 1910s cover of Hobo News

The hobo colleges, which How started in several cities, primarily offered lodging and meals, but as the name implies also education and a place to meet. The education would be scheduled certain nights and included basic lessons in social science, industrial law, public speaking, job searching, and anything else that might be understood and useful for the hobos. The lectures were held by street orators as well as academics. How often talked about social politics subjects such as 8-hour working day, pensions, and unemployment. The ensuing discussions were known to be very lively. They also served as community meeting places where the homeless workers could express themselves. Hobo College was held mainly in winter when there were fewer jobs and more hobos in the cities.

The success of the "colleges" varied. The Chicago branch was the biggest and one year debated with University of Chicago students. A hobo college was usually a rented building in the hobo area of a city. There would be blankets for sleeping, a washroom, and a kitchen, where the hobos cooked their favorite mulligan stew. The houses often failed, and How had to spend much time going around and restarting them.

The other main work of How and the IBWA was the Hobo News, a magazine for hobos. Hobo News was published from about 1915 to at least 1929, and is now considered a predecessor to the modern street paper movement.

According to contemporary sociologist Nels Anderson, How had almost complete control over the IBWA and Hobo News, at least in the beginning. This was not because he sought power—he had strong democratic ideals and gave individual "colleges" and other projects much management sovereignty—but rather because of his money, which was often needed for new ideas or to cover for financial problems. How often paid for meals at the hobo conventions and other meetings. Less optimistic critics said that without the doughnuts and other free food, the hobos would show little interest in How's organizations. However, How never gave cash to those who tried to ask him for it.

After the start of World War I, the Espionage Act of 1917, and government attacks on the larger Industrial Workers of the World (IWW), the less radical IBWA and the Hobo News also came under scrutiny. The IBWA often pointed out that it was distinct from the IWW, though somewhat supportive of the other organization. As IWW was increasingly broken many of its members joined IBWA, leading to both radicalization and faction conflicts. How was on the moderate side and preferred the IBWA to focus on education and more immediate political issues like abolishing vagrancy laws, rather than direct action and sabotage.

=== Other ===
How became mentor of Ben Reitman, who said the first time he went to an IBWA meeting and met How changed his whole life. Reitman went on to found the Chicago hobo college, one of the most successful, in 1908.

How was chairman of the National Committee for the Relief of the Unemployed in New York but went back to St. Louis in 1908, after disagreeing with other leaders.

In 1914, How led a group from the IBWA in New York to join the second Coxey's Army protest march to Washington, D.C.

== Later life ==
At 50, How married and moved to Los Angeles in the 1920s with his wife Ingeborg Sorenson. They had a house built by the famous architect Rudolf M. Schindler in the suburb Silver Lake, in 1925–26. It was designated a Los Angeles Historic-Cultural Monument in 2007. How did not stop his social work, however. The couple divorced two years before How's death. In 1924, How was sued by Cora Victoria Diehl for breaking a contract to marry in 1919. According to How, the couple called off their engagement after they found they were incompatible with one another with him saying he felt it would be wrong to be engaged to her and possibly spoil her career. According to How, the IBWA recommended that How pay Diehl a settlement of over $5000, which he claims to have obliged. Diehl claimed to have received $2250.

=== Death ===
In July 1930, How fainted in Cincinnati Union Station and was taken care of by his friend and attorney Nicholas Klein. He received medical care but died of pneumonia and starvation two weeks later, on July 22, 1930, at age 56. How was buried in Bellefontaine Cemetery in St. Louis.

== Bibliography ==
- Anderson, Nels; Rauty (1998). "8. How and the Hobos: Character sketch of J. E. How, "Millionaire Hobo"". On Hobos and Homelessness. University of Chicago Press. pp. 90–. ISBN 0-226-01966-7. Reprint from Burgess Papers, Regenstein Library, Department of Special Collections, University of Chicago (box 127, folder 6, document 126), unpublished document.
- Bruns, Roger A. (2001). The Damndest Radical: The Life and World of Ben Reitman. University of Illinois Press. pp. 21–22, 51. ISBN 0-252-06989-7.
- Adrian, Lynne M (1998). James Philip Danky; Wayne A. Wiegand (eds.). Print Culture in a Diverse America (illustrated ed.). University of Illinois Press. pp. 102–105. ISBN 0-252-06699-5.
- DePastino, Todd (2003). Citizen hobo: how a century of homelessness shaped America. University of Chicago Press. pp. 105–. ISBN 0-226-14378-3.
- Heinz, Teresa L.; Levinson, David (2004). Encyclopedia of Homelessness (illustrated ed.). Sage. pp. 34, 534, 736. ISBN 0-7619-2751-4.
- Howley, Kevin (2005). Community Media: People, Places, and Communication Technologies. Cambridge University Press. pp. 62–64. ISBN 0-521-79228-2.
- Kusmer, Kenneth L. (2003). Down & Out, on the Road: The Homeless in American History. Oxford University Press US. pp. 162–. ISBN 0-19-516096-7.
