= 1920 Socialist National Convention =

- 1920 presidential election
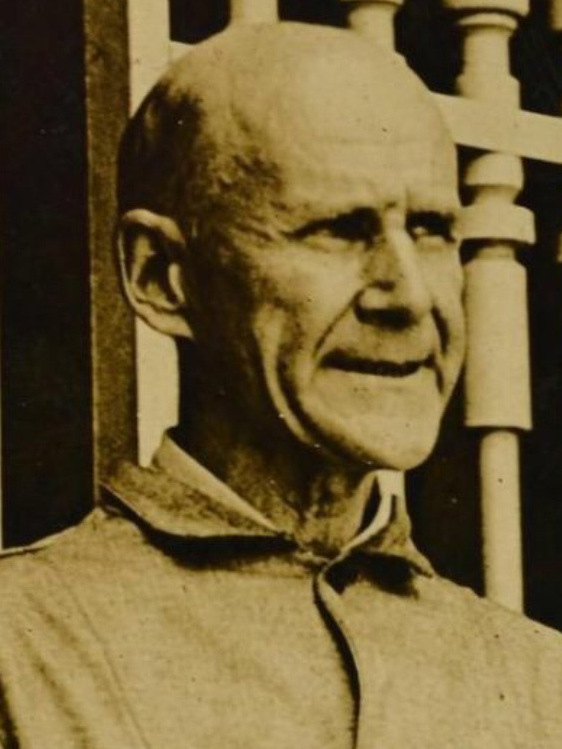
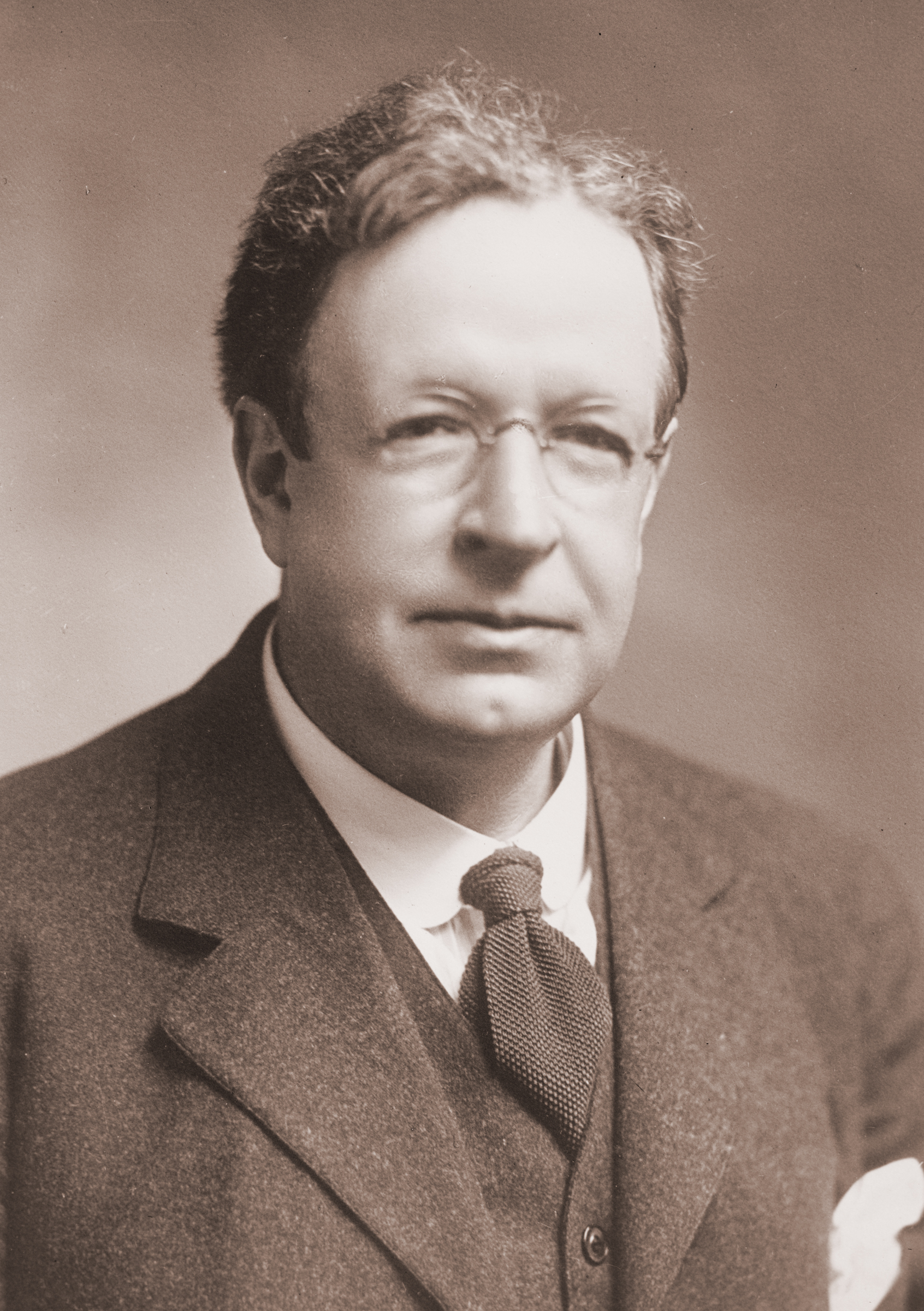
- Nominees (Debs and Stedman)

Convention
- Dates: May 8–14, 1920
- City: New York City, New York
- Venue: Finnish Socialist Hall

Candidates
- Presidential nominee: Eugene V. Debs of Indiana
- Vice-presidential nominee: Seymour Stedman of Illinois

Voting
- Total delegates: 161
- Results (president): 132 for Debs (unanimous)
- Results (vice president): 106 Stedman; 36 O'Hare
- Ballots: 1

The 1920 Socialist National Convention was held May 8-14, 1920, in New York City. It saw the Socialist Party of America saw Eugene V. Debs nominated for president and Seymour Stedman for vice president. Debs was unable to attend the convention himself, as he was currently incarcerated.

The party adopted a platform which retained its membership in the Third International, but also sought to establish a more centrist "New International". The party's platform also hailed Debs's presidential candidacy as challenging the "entire rotten capitalistic system", and committed the party towards non-intervention in internal politics of trade unions (while encouraging unions to organize around the "One Big Union" concept).

== Background ==
The 1920 convention marked the party's first presidential nominating convention since 1912. The party had not held a convention for the 1916 United States presidential election, and instead had held a mail-in referendum among its members to nominate Allan L. Benson for president in that election. The convention's ultimate nominee, Eugene V. Debs, was incarcerated at the Atlanta federal penitentiary at the time of the 1920 election for his conviction over non-compliance with the draft during World War I. The 1920 election was Debs's fifth and last attempt to become president.

A schism arose in the party ahead of 1920. The more radical members of the party held their own convention in New York City in June 1919, which was attended by 94 delegates from twenty states. A vote to create a new party was defeated by a vote of 55 to 38, causing 31 delegates to withdraw from the convention. These 31 delegates held their own convention in Chicago on September 1, where they founded the Communist Party USA. The Communist Party USA attempted to give its presidential nomination to Debs, but he declined the nomination. When the Socialist Party held its 1919 party meeting in Chicago with 140 delegates in attendance. Twenty-six delegates, who were members of the party's left wing, left the convention. These delegates attempted to unite with the Communist Party USA, but formed the Communist Labor Party of America on September 2, after those attempts failed. The Socialist Party had 100,000 members before the splits, but it fell to 55,000 members while the Communist Party had 35,000 members and the Communist Labor Party had 10,000 members. The Communist Party claimed to have 60,000 members while the Communist Labor Party claimed to have 30,000 members. The United Communist Party was formed in May 1920 between the Communist Labor Party and some members of the Communist Party. The United Communist Party and the Communist Party united in December 1921 to form the Workers Party of America.

== Convention logistics ==
The convention was held May 8–14 at the Finnish Socialist Hall in New York City, which was located at the intersection of 5th Avenue and 127th Street. The venue was described as being filled to capacity by an enthusiastic attendance.

161 delegates attended the convention, representing 31 states. Presidential nominee Eugene Debs was absent from the convention, as he was incarcerated.

Morris Hilquit served as convention chairman. On the first day of the convention, William F. Kruse initiated a vote to challenge Hilquit being the convention's chairman. In the resulting vote for party chairman, Morris Hillquit prevailed, defeating J. Louis Engdahl in a 91–29 vote. Lazarus S. Davidow served as the convention's vice chairman.

== Ideological schism ==
The convention saw divisions between three blocs of delegates. He described the first bloc as being comparatively right wing, and forming the majority on most votes in consort with a second bloc that he described as being comparatively "centrist or national right". The third bloc, which largely fell in the minority on votes, was described as being more "radical" and "left wing". This third bloc was represented by approximately one-third of delegates.

Hennacy identified the leading figures of the more right-wing bloc as being Meyer London, Victor L. Berger, William A. King, G.A. Hoehn, Joseph D. Cannon, Charles Solomon, William Karlin.

Hannecy identified the leading figures of the more centrist bloc as being Morris Hillquit (party chairman), Jacob Panken, Algernon Lee, Bernard Berlyn, James Oneal, William R. Henry, Joseph Saltis.

Hannecy identified the leading figures of the minority (more left-wing) bloc as being William F. Kruse, J. Louis Engdahl, Benjamin Glassberg, Irwin St. John Tucker, Edward E. Holland, Stephen Bircher, and Walter M. Cook.

== Nominations ==
Edward Henry (a friend of Debs), Lena Morrow Lewis, and Oscar Ameringer, nominated Debs for the party's nomination on May 13, 1920, and 134 delegates to the national convention voted unanimously to give him the nomination. Kate Richards O'Hare, who was also in prison, was considered for the vice-presidential nomination, but Seymour Stedman was selected by a vote of 106 to 26, which was later made unanimous, to have one of the candidates campaign. James H. Maurer was also considered for the vice-presidential nomination, but he declined due to his duties as head of the Pennsylvania Federation of Labor. Debs accepted the presidential nomination in an Atlanta prison on May 29, after being notified by Seymour, James Oneal, and Julius Gerber.

In his speech nominating Debs, Henry hailed Debs as the Lincoln of the Wabash". Other speakers similarly likened Debs as someone who would emancipate Americans from capitalism similarly how Lincoln emancipated many slaves.

Presidential ballot
Eugene V. Debs	132

Vice presidential ballot
Seymour Stedman	106
Katie O'Hare	36

== Party platform and resolutions ==
The convention's adopted party platform was authored by Hillquit. The proposed party platform had been re-drafted by Hillquiut after the initial draft was criticized by more radical party members for being too conservative. The convention voted 103–33 in favor of ratifying the platform.

The platform hailed Debs's candidacy as a challenge to the "entire rotten capitalistic system".

The convention voted after lengthy debate to retain its position on non-interference with the internal operations of trade unions, but amended its position to include a statement about preferring that unions organize either in the mold of industrialism unionism that forms a singular working class body, hailing the "One Big Union" concept.

On May 14, the party adopted a plank declaring its adherence to the Third International. This had been urged by the report of the convention's Committee on Foreign Relations. Hillquit had presented the committee's report to the convention. While the convention chose to retain the party's affiliation with the Third international, it also supported efforts to itself form a "New International" that would include "all true Socialists of the world". The convention voted 90–40 in favor of the decision to remain in the Third International, but also attempt to form a more-centrist "New International" (with the alternative being to remain in the Third International and not attempt to form a "New International"). An area of disagreement within the party had been whether to affiliate with the Communist International. Approximately one quarter of delegates wanted the party to fully integrate itself into it, with the leading names in that camp including J. Louis Engdahl, William Kruse, and Beniamin Glassberg. While the majority of delegates were somewhat supportive of affiliating with the Soviet Communist Party, that same majority was also hesitant about the leadership structure in the Soviet government being "a dictatorship of the proletariat in the form of soviets" and a desire that similar structure not be imposed upon American socialist movements. This was the reason for opting for a new international.

One plank of the platform called for migrant workers to be given voter registration in elections.

The platform considers it "vitally necessary" for "the workers [to] organize along industrial lines" for the election of representation in all legislative bodies.

=== Rejected/unratified planks and resolutions ===
After debate proved lengthy, the convention abandoned consideration of a resolution that would have alleged that churches were controlled by capitalists. The convention further refused to adopt a position on whether church property should be taxed. The convention also did not ratify a proposed resolution that would have expressed sympathy for James Larkin and Benjamin Gitlow, who were both serving unrelated prison sentences.

The convention also removed a proposed plank that would have called for elected officials who voted for military appropriations to be expelled.

== Other matters ==
The convention voted down a proposed rules change that world have made members of the party's National Executive Committee be elected by proportional representation.

The convention amendment the party's constitution making U.S. citizenship an eligibility requirement for party executive board and governing committee membership, as well as delegate status at its international, national, state, and local conventions. This change was made in reaction to proceedings during proceedings to oust five Socialist members of the New York Assembly, in which the party's allowing of non-citizens to serve as committee members and delegates was raised as an issue against the Socialist Party, with opponents noting that this hypothetically made it possible for the party to be fully-controlled by non-citizens.
