= Cora Victoria Diehl =

American civil servant (1869–1961)

Cora Diehl Harvey
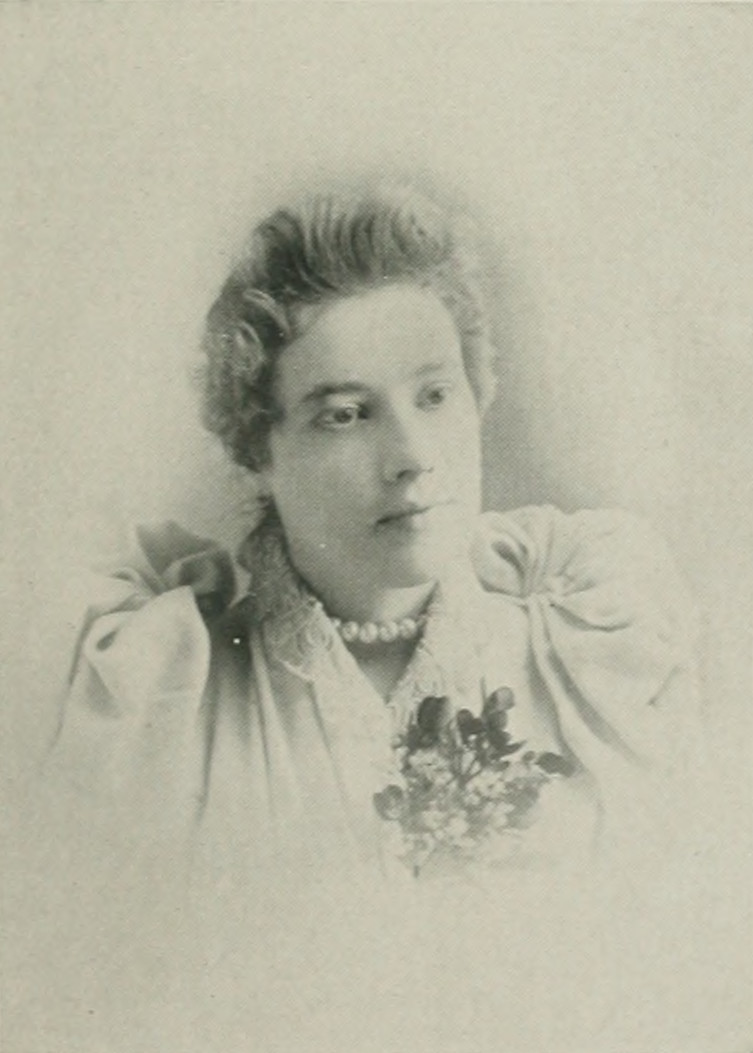

Register of Deeds for Logan County, Oklahoma Territory
- In office March 1892 (Note: While elected in February 1891, Diehl did not take office until March 1892 after the Duvall v. Diehl decision found she was the rightful holder of the office.) – 1893
- Preceded by: Edward Duvall (Note: Diehl was elected to succeed Louis Laws, but the Logan County Commission initially refused to recognize her election and appointed Edward Duvall to the office.)
- Succeeded by: George H. Dobson

Personal details
- Born: Cora Victoria Diehl; January 19, 1869 Laurelton, Pennsylvania, U.S.
- Died: November 19, 1961 (aged 92) Hinton, Oklahoma, U.S.
- Party: People's Party (1891–1900s)
- Other party: Greenback Party (before 1891)

Cora Victoria Diehl (also known as Cora D. Harvey; January 19, 1869 – November 19, 1961) was an American politician who served from 1891 to 1893 as the first woman elected to public office in Oklahoma Territory. Her election was upheld by the Oklahoma Territorial Supreme Court in Duvall v. Diehl (1892).

== Early life ==
Cora Victoria Diehl was born in Laurelton, Pennsylvania, on January 19, 1869. Her father was H. C. Diehl. At age 11, the family moved to Great Bend, Kansas. Diehl became active in the Greenback Party. After briefly moving to Montrose, Colorado, she returned to Great Bend and was appointed deputy register for the office of the register of deeds. She served in that position from 1888 to January 1, 1890. Diehl had one sibling, a sister named Hilda.

== Election in Oklahoma ==
In August 1890 the Governor of Oklahoma Territory, George Steele, called for the first territorial elections. They were scheduled for February 1891. The appointed-incumbent Republican Party officials campaigned for re-election against a fusion ticket of the People's Party and the Democratic Party, despite the state People's Party being officially anti-fusion tickets.

In 1891, at the age of 21, Diehl campaigned with the fusion ticket slogan of "Equal rights to all, special privileges to none" and won the nomination for the People's Party of Oklahoma for the Logan County register of deeds. She also campaigned with Mary Elizabeth Lease, who was also of the Populist Party. During the campaign the fusion ticket system was heavily criticized by the Republican newspaper the Weekly Oklahoma State Capital. While the Republican paper extensively covered the election, it did not mention Diehl's gender nor age and focused on promoting the Republican candidate M. D. Losey.

On February 3, 1891, Diehl won the election to become the new register of deeds with 1,475 votes to Losey's 1,311; the fusion ticket swept the election by winning all 10 county offices. The election win was credited to the People's Party's focus on class conflict winning over traditionally Republican-voting black voters. She was the first woman elected to public office in Oklahoma Territory.

=== Duvall v. Diehl and re-election campaign ===
Diehl's predecessor as register of deeds, Louis Laws, refused to accept the election results. Laws removed all of the county records and the county seal and locked them in a safe in the National Bank in Guthrie. Judge Edward B. Green issued an order allowing for the safe to be forced open in order to retrieve the stolen property. The newly elected officials used dynamite to open the safe and retrieve the stolen records and seal. Afterward violence broke out, causing U.S. Marshall William C. Grimes and Sheriff John W. Hixon to intervene.

After the records were forcibly recovered and the violence had settled, Laws continued his campaign to remain in office. He filed suit in the Logan County District Court arguing that Diehl was ineligible to hold the office as a woman; that the election was illegally held; that the office did not exist separately from the office of county clerk; and that the office was still rightfully held by him.

After Laws filed his lawsuit the newly elected county commissioners (despite being nominated on the same ticket) responded that they agreed Diehl had been illegally elected because she was a woman and appointed Edward Duvall to the office. Additionally, County Clerk Henry H. Bockfinger agreed with Laws that the office was not separate from the county clerk's office and claimed the seat was rightfully his. While two of the three claimants to her office were of her own party, Diehl maintained support of portions of the party, with the Logan County Spring Valley Township Farmer's Alliance writing "we nominated and elected Cora Diehl (not as an ornament to grace the ticket) but a young woman having the necessary qualifications to fill the office by virtue of her ability and experience."

When the suit reached the Supreme Court of Oklahoma Territory as the 1892 case Duvall v. Diehl, all four claimants (Diehl, Laws, Bockfinger, and Duvall) maintained they had the right to hold the office. Justice John C. Clark held that Diehl was "qualified" and "duly elected" in an opinion issued in January 1892. (Note: Of the other claimants the Court found: "the right of Louis H. Laws to exercise the duties of the office... expired when Cora V. Diehl was elected"; "Bockfinger cannot legally exercise the duties of Register of Deeds"; and Duvall's claim was dismissed with "costs of this proceeding taxed against him.")

In March 1892, Diehl finally took office for the final seven months of her term and faced re-election in November later that year. Diehl campaigned for re-election, but lost to George H. Dobson by 141 votes. Historian Megan Benson attributes her loss to elimination of partisan ballots and fusion tickets. After leaving office she was sued by the new Logan County commissioners over a bond she was forced to sign to take office. The dispute again reached the territorial supreme court with the case Commissioners of Logan County v. Harvey, where Justice Bierer found that the bond was extorted from Diehl and therefore void.

== Later advocacy ==
After losing her re-election, she campaigned for women's suffrage in Oklahoma. By 1909 she was acting as secretary of the International Brotherhood Welfare Association (IBWA). At the IBWA's 1911 convention, she was again the secretary of the organization. She spoke at the national convention in 1911, and was elected treasurer in 1912. In reports of the 1912 Cincinnati convention, she was termed the "Queen of the Hoboes".

In September 1914, it was reported that the IBWA was presenting a play written by Diehl with the proceeds going towards establishing an employment bureau in Philadelphia. The play was entitled "On the Road" and was intended to highlight the unfairness of vagrancy laws.

By the 1910s Diehl's rhetoric took a more socialist and revolutionary turn, putting her at odds with the moderate faction of the organization. Diehl left the IBWA in 1924.

== Personal life ==
Diehl married John Nolan Harvey in Kansas City on July 17, 1893. The couple had two children, Helen and Bessie, before divorcing around 1906.

In 1924, Diehl sued James Eads How, the founder of the IBWA, for breaking a contract to marry her. Their engagement had been announced since 1919, but instead he married his stenographer Ingeborg Sorenson on August 19, 1924. According to How, the couple called off their engagement after they found they were incompatible with one another. He said he felt it would be wrong to be engaged to her and possibly spoil her career. According to How, the IBWA recommended that How pay Diehl a settlement of over $5000, which he obliged. Diehl claimed to have received $2250.

By February 1925, Harvey had returned to Hinton, Oklahoma, where she purchased considerable property. By April 1926 she had also bought a holiday cottage in Bella Vista, Arkansas.

Cora Diehl Harvey died on November 19, 1961.

== Electoral history ==
February 1891 Logan County, Oklahoma Territory Register of Deeds election
Party	Candidate	Votes	%
Democratic	Cora Victoria Diehl	N/A	N/A
Populist	Cora Victoria Diehl	N/A	N/A
Total	Cora Victoria Diehl	1,475	52.9%
Republican	M.D. Losey	1,311	47.1%
Total votes		2,786	100
Populist gain from Republican			

November 1892 Logan County, Oklahoma Territory Register of Deeds election
Party	Candidate	Votes	%
Republican	George H. Dobson	2,173	51.6%
Democratic	Cora Victoria Diehl	N/A	N/A
Populist	Cora Victoria Diehl	N/A	N/A
Total	Cora Victoria Diehl (incumbent)	2,042	48.4%
Total votes		4,215	100
Republican gain from Populist			
