= Nicholas Klein =

American labor union advocate (1884–1951)

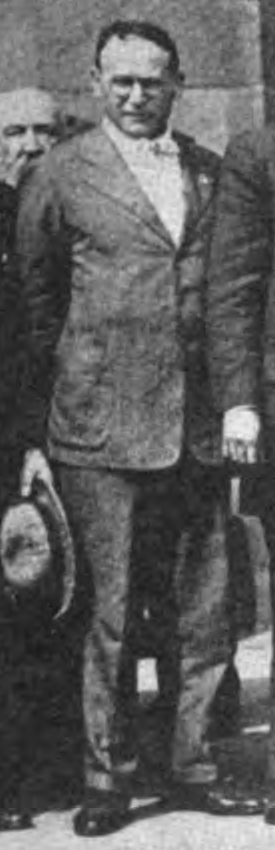
Klein c. 1918

Nicholas Klein (1884–1951) was an American labor union advocate, and attorney who is best known for his speech to the Amalgamated Clothing Workers of America in 1918.

== Biography ==
Klein was born in Cincinnati, became an orphan at 16 and started his career as a European reporter for the magazine of Los Angeles socialist Gaylord Wilshire in 1904. He wrote for the Hobo News later.

In 1907, Nicholas Klein ran in Ohio's 2nd congressional district as a third-party candidate for US House of Representatives from Socialist Party of America but lost to Republican incumbent Herman P. Goebel. He became an attorney after graduating from Nashville YMCA Night Law School in 1910, and worked as an adviser for James Eads How. In 1920s he was affiliated with Universal Negro Improvement Association and provided legal counsel to Marcus Garvey before his deportation in 1927. In 1935, he was elected to Cincinnati City Council, serving three terms later. During his last term in 1940–1941, he served as Vice Mayor of the city.

Klein married Eva Chassin in June 1916 and had two daughters, who were named Peace and Liberty. They lived in Bond Hill. He was a Free Mason.

== Address to the Clothing Workers ==
Klein is best known for his speech to the Clothing Workers in May 1918, where he said the following:

[…] my friends, after this war, there will be a great unemployment problem. The munition plants will be closed and useless, and millions of munitions workers will be thrown out upon the market. And then the time will come to show whether you strikers and you workers believe one hundred per cent for organized labor or only 35 per cent […] And my friends, in this story you have a history of this entire movement. First they ignore you. Then they ridicule you. And then they attack you and want to burn you. And then they build monuments to you. And that is what is going to happen to the Amalgamated Clothing Workers of America. And I say, courage to the strikers, and courage to the delegates, because great times are coming, stressful days are here, and I hope your hearts will be strong, and I hope you will be one hundred per cent union when it comes!

Klein's words are often summarized as "First they ignore you, then they laugh at you, then they fight you, then you win", and misattributed to Mahatma Gandhi, who made different remarks to a similar effect in a 1920 speech at Muzaffarabad, included in Freedom’s Battle. (Note: "Ridicule is like repression. Both give place to respect when they fail to produce the intended effect. […] It will be admitted that non-co-operation has passed the stage ridicule. Whether it will now be met by repression or respect remains to be seen. […] But the testing time has now arrived. In a civilized country when ridicule fails to kill a movement it begins to command respect.")

A possible precursor is "All truth passes through three stages. First, it is ridiculed. Second, it is violently opposed. Third, it is accepted as being self-evident", a misquotation of Arthur Schopenhauer recorded at least as early as 1913. Schopenhauer's actual wording, included in a preface to The World as Will and Representation in 1819, translates as "the truth, to which only a brief triumph is allotted between the two long periods in which it is condemned as paradoxical or disparaged as trivial".

== See also ==
- US labor law
