= Workers' Council of the United States =

Short-lived American socialist organization

Workers's Council of the United States
- Founded: 1920
- Dissolved: 1921
- Preceded by: Socialist Party of America
- Succeeded by: Workers Party of America
- Ideology: Communism; Marxism–Leninism
- Political position: Far-left
- International affiliation: Comintern

The Workers' Council of the United States, commonly known as the "Workers' Council," was a short-lived organized faction of former Socialist Party of America members seeking to affiliate with the Comintern. When that failed, it agitated for the creation of an open communist party. It was small and short-lived group, but it played an important role in the 1921 creation of the Workers Party of America. According to Theodore Draper in his 1957 book The Roots of American Communism, its founders included: Moissaye Olgin, J. Louis Engdahl, Alexander Trachtenberg, William F. Kruse, and Melech Epstein.

== Organizational history ==
Cover of Workers' Council (1:8, October 15, 2021), bi-weekly organ of the Workers' Council

The group began as the Committee for the Third International in 1920, as an internal group within the Socialist Party advocating affiliation with the Communist International. Meanwhile, several ethnic federations were growing weary of the rightward shift of the party. The Finnish Socialist Federation voted to leave in December 1920. When the party convention decided against joining the Comintern at its June 1921 convention, the Czech federation left in late August, followed by the Yiddish language-speaking Jewish Socialist Federation in September. The Jewish Federation would provide the bulk of the group's membership.

The Committee officially left the Socialist Party after the Jewish Federation had seceded, changing its name to the "Workers Council of the United States." The new group advocated a completely legal Communist movement in the United States, a stand that only aggravated internal disharmony within the recently united Communist Party of America.

After a series of negotiations the Workers' Council, the American Labor Alliance (the CPs already existing legal front) and the Communist Party of America agreed to the creation of the Workers Party of America at a convention at Star Casino, New York on December 23–26, 1921. One of the stipulations for the Workers' Council joining the new organization was the creation of a daily Yiddish newspaper. This was paper, the Morgen Freiheit ("Morning Freedom"), was launched on April 22, 1922, with M.J. Olgin as editor.

From April 1 to December 15, 1921, the Workers' Council published ten issues of a biweekly serial called The Workers' Council. The publication was initially edited by Benjamin Glassberg, who was succeeded by Louis Engdahl. At the time of the establishment of the Workers Party of America, this periodical was merged with The Toiler to form The Worker, which in 1924 expanded to daily frequency as the well-known publication, The Daily Worker.

== Members ==
- J. Louis Engdahl (co-founder)
- William F. Kruse (co-founder)
- Alexander Trachtenberg (co-founder)
- J. B. Salutsky (co-founder)
- Moissaye J. Olgin (co-founder)
- Benjamin Glassberg
- Melech Epstein
- Naye Welt
- Ludwig Lore
- Walter M. Cook (secretary of publishing association of Workers’ Council
- Rose Weiss
- Isadore (I.) Cohen
- L. DeGregoria
- Juliet Stuart Poyntz

== Publications ==
- A complete digital archive of The Workers' Council
- Go to the masses! A manifesto of the Third congress of the Third International; also the withdrawal statement of the Committee for the Third International of the Socialist party to the members of the Socialist party.
