= Roger Bruns =

American historian

Roger A. Bruns (born 1941) is an author and the former deputy director for the National Archives and Records Administration of the United States. His books have included Preacher : Billy Sunday and big-time American evangelism, Almost History, an anthology of historical American documents which were about the subsequent course of American history, as well as biographies of Billy Graham, Jesse Jackson, Martin Luther King Jr., and George Washington.

== Selected works ==
- Knights of the Road: A Hobo History (1980)
- The Damndest Radical: The Life and World of Ben Reitman, Chicago's Celebrated Social Reformer, Hobo King, and Whorehouse Physician (1987)
- Preacher: Billy Sunday and Big-Time American Evangelism (1992)
- The Bandit Kings: from Jesse James to Pretty Boy Floyd (1995)
- Desert Honkytonk: The Story of Tombstone's Bird Cage Theatre (2000)
- Cesar Chavez: A Biography (2005)
- Cesar Chavez and the United Farm Workers Movement (2011)
- Encyclopedia of Cesar Chavez: The Farm Workers' Fight for Rights and Justice (2013)
