= International Brotherhood Welfare Association =

Mutual aid society for hobos (1905–06)

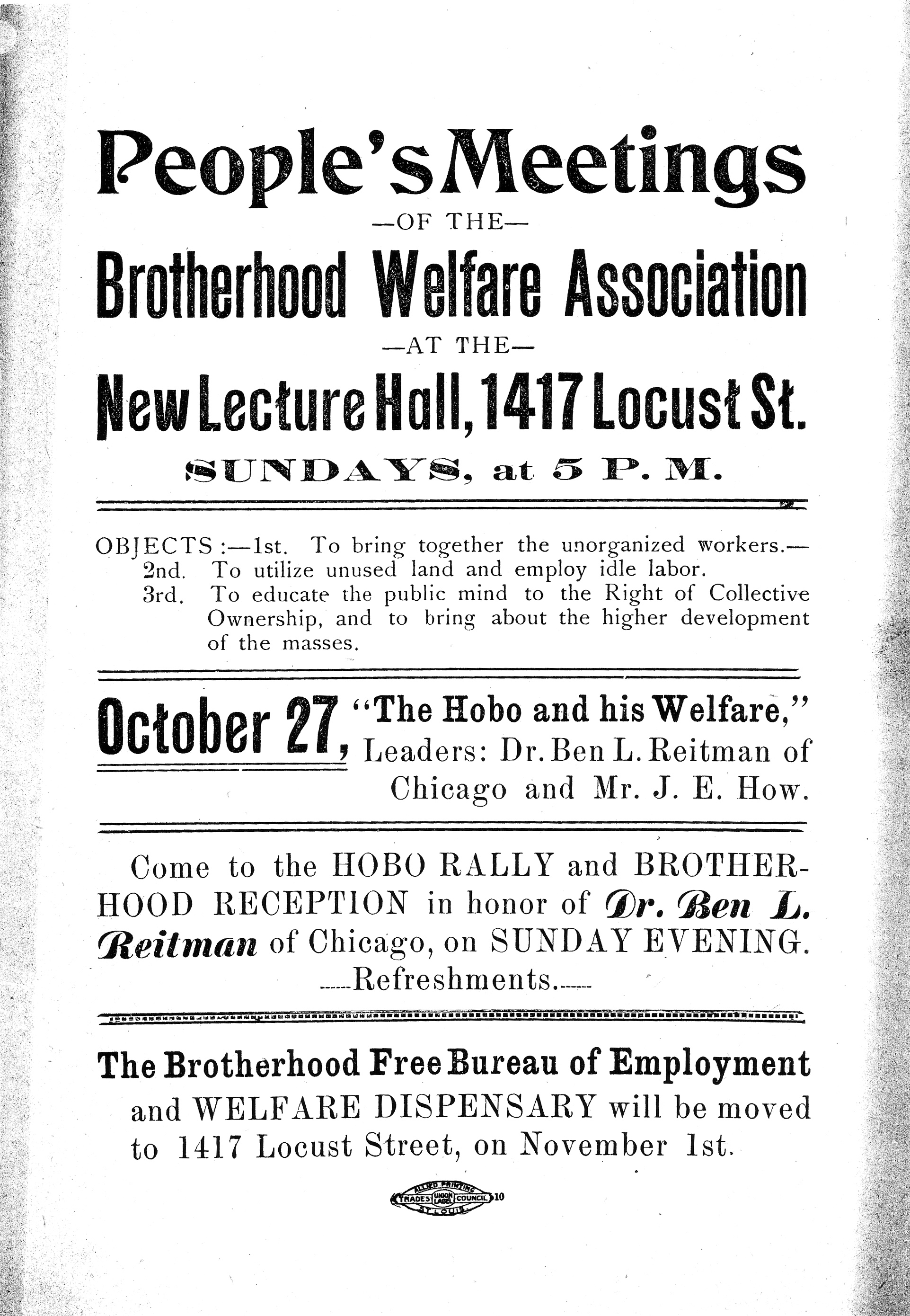
An IBWA poster advertising a meeting with Ben Reitman and James Eads How

The International Brotherhood Welfare Association (IBWA) was a mutual aid society for hobos founded in 1905–1906. It was the second largest after the Industrial Workers of the World (IWW). It was started by James Eads How who had inherited a fortune but chose to live a hobo life. IBWA was less radical than the IWW, focusing on education and cooperation rather than direct political action. It published the Hobo News, distributed through street sellers. The IBWA was centered in the midwest (St. Louis, Kansas City, Chicago) and had locals in about twenty cities including Baltimore, Buffalo, Philadelphia and San Francisco. The centers, called "Hobo Colleges," offered lodging, hot meals and education. They also became important meeting places for migrant workers during the winter months.

== Purpose ==
The object of the 'Welfare Brotherhood' is twofold. I want to make the 'hoboes' not only better citizens, but better 'hoboes,' and I want the public to appreciate what the 'beat' is, what his rights are, and how he should be looked upon.

— James Eads How, to the New York Times in 1907.

Contemporary sociologist Nels Anderson wrote in 1923 that the official program of the IBWA was:

A. To bring together the unorganized workers.
B. To co-operate with persons and organizations who desire to better social conditions.
C. To utilize unused land and machinery in order to provide work for the unemployed.
D. To furnish medical, legal and other aid to its members.
E. To organize the unorganized and assist them in obtaining work at remunerative wages and transportation when required.
F. To educate the public mind to the right of collective ownership in production and distribution.

G. To bring about the scientific, industrial, intellectual, moral and spiritual development of the masses.

== Hobo colleges ==
The hobo colleges, which How started in several cities, primarily offered lodging and meals, but as the name implies also education and a place to meet. The education would be scheduled certain nights and included basic social science, industrial law, vagrancy laws, public speaking, searching for jobs, venereal disease and anything that may be understood and useful for the hobos. They also covered subjects like philosophy, literature and religion. The lectures were held by street orators as well as academics. How often talked about social politics subjects such as 8-hour working day, pensions and unemployment. The discussions following were known to be very lively. They also served as community meeting places where the homeless workers could express themselves. It was held mainly in winter when there were fewer jobs and more hobos in the cities. The success of the "colleges" varied. The Chicago branch was the biggest and one year debated with University of Chicago students. A hobo college was usually a rented building in the hobo area of a city. There would be blankets for sleeping, a washroom and a kitchen, where the hobos cooked their favorite mulligan stew. The houses often failed, and How had to spend much time going around and restarting them.

The Chicago branch was started by Ben Reitman, and when he was out travelling by Irwin St. John Tucker and the Episcopal minister Michael C. Walsh. It graduated hundreds of hobos every year, 164 of them in 1926.

== Control of the IBWA ==
According to Anderson, the IBWA was largely controlled by J. E. How, at least before the First World War. Not formally, but because the organization was dependent on his financial support.

The IBWA was separate, but supporting, of the IWW. There were however failed attempts by IWW to take over IBWA. After the Big Pinch of government action against the IWW in 1917, the IBWA grew rapidly but was radicalized by in inflow of Wobblies (IWW people), attracting negative government attention. Radical members of the IBWA, also started the Migratory Workers Union in 1918 with financing by How who was otherwise a moderate, but it was largely defunct by 1922. Conflict between the two factions continued, and Hobo World was created as a more radical rival of Hobo News. While Hobo World was published more irregularly, the two competed to be the genuine voice of hobo culture.
