= Melech Epstein =

American historian (1889–1979)

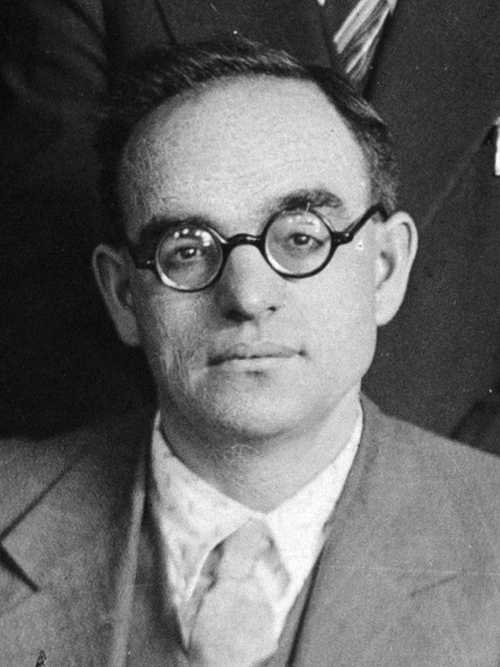
Epstein c. 1922–1923

Melech Epstein (Yiddish: מלך עפשטײן, 1889–1979) was an American journalist and historian. His two most famous books, Jewish labor in U.S.A. and The Jew and communism are considered standard works.

== Early life ==
Melech Epstein was born in Ruzhany, Grodno Guberniya, Imperial Russia (now in Belarus). His family was unsure of his exact birth date, but assigned him March 15, 1889, the eve of the Jewish holiday of Purim. During his teenage years he became active in the Jewish territorialist movement. Beginning shortly before the 1905 revolution he was a cadre in the Zionist Socialist Workers Party in Białystok, Łódź, Warsaw, Kiev and Odessa. His activities included writing for party journals, organizing unions and Jewish cultural societies and, in Białystok manning an armed guard of the Jewish neighborhood during a pogrom. He served three intermittent periods in the Czarist prisons. Becoming dissatisfied with the ultimate aims of the territorialists he emigrated to America in 1913. He arrived at Ellis Island on December 24, 1913.

In New York, Epstein settled in Brownsville, Brooklyn and became involved in the local Jewish radical scene. In 1915 he became labor reporter for a new Yiddish daily, The Day. Soon he became labor editor, which was an ideal place to observe the burgeoning Jewish labor and radical movements. After The Day came out in favor of foreign intervention against the Bolsheviks Epstein left the paper and joined the staff of Zeit, a Labor Zionist paper edited by David Pinsky. While working for Zeit he exposed financial improprieties involving Lucy Lang, the Forward and the United Hebrew Trades. As a result, the UHT forced his expulsion from its affiliate, the Yiddish Writers Union, which Epstein had helped to found in 1917. Despairing of mainstream union bureaucracy, he left the Socialist Party in 1921, as part of the Workers Council of the United States. When this group merged with the communists to form the Workers Party of America Epstein was offered a place as labor editor on the communists' new Yiddish daily, Morgen Freiheit.

== In the Communist Party ==
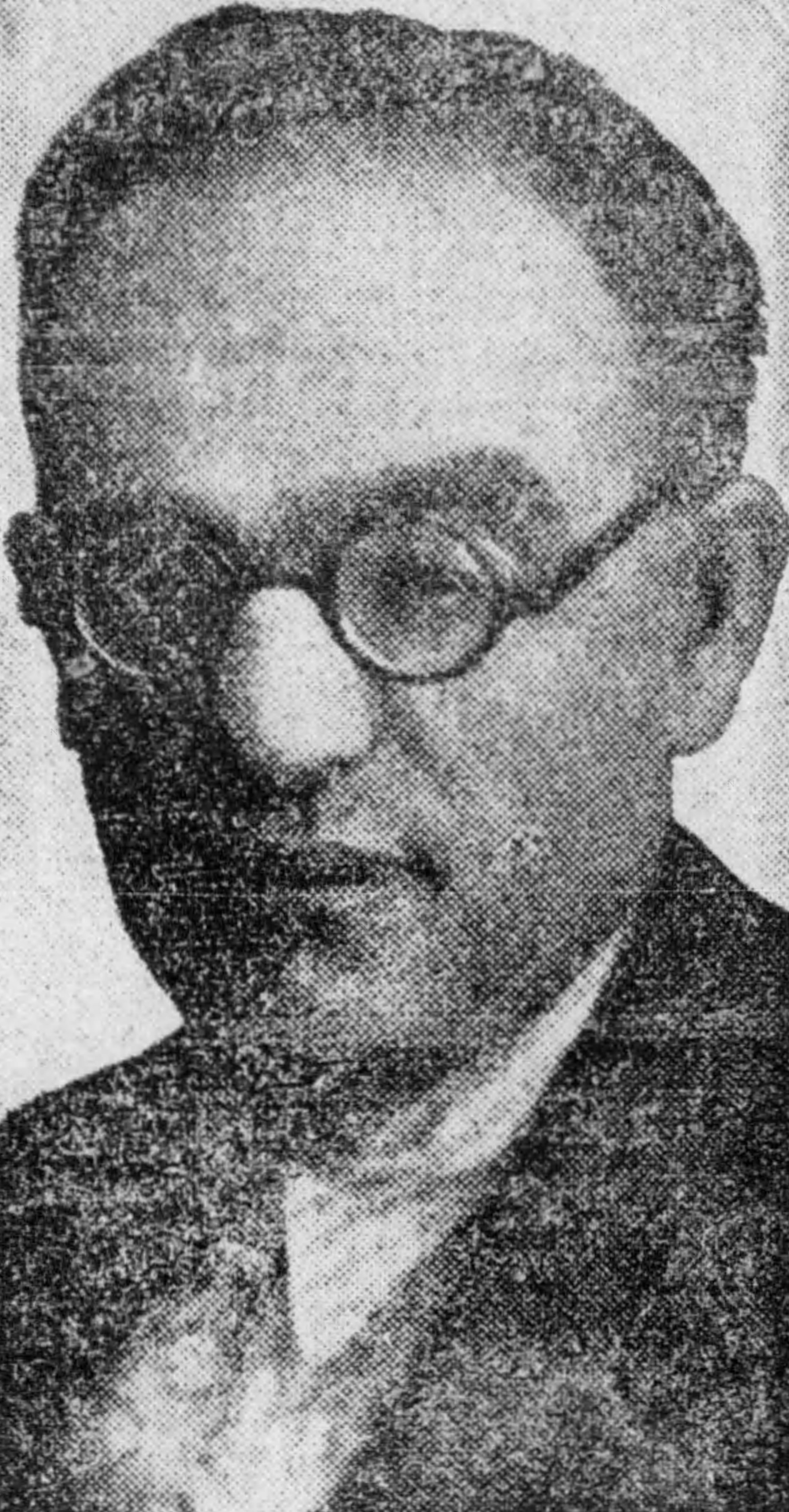
Epstein c. 1928

After a factional skirmish Epstein was made acting editor in 1923 and official editor in 1925. As editor he tried to steer the Freiheit into a more broad left direction and resisted pressures to make its content dogmatically communist. A member of the Lovestone faction within the party he resigned the editorship in spring 1929 during intense factional warfare within the party. In August 1929 both Epstein and Moissaye Joseph Olgin, the new Freiheit editor were censured by the party for taking a pro-Yishuv stand in reporting on the out break of violence in Palestine. Under party pressure the paper changed its analysis reporting the revolt as a national liberation movement against the British and their Zionist collaborators. That fall Epstein was relieved of all other party offices and was sent to the Soviet Union to "improve his communist morale".

He returned in 1931. No longer on the staff of Freiheit, he became educational director of the TUUL Needle Trades Workers Industrial Union and editor of its weekly Needle Worker. He was allowed to return to the Freiheit during the transition to the popular front period in the mid-1930s. In 1936 he was sent to Palestine, officially as a Freiheit correspondent, but actually as an emissary to the Palestine Communist Party. The out break of yet another revolt strained relations between the CPUSA and American Jewry. The Comintern was silent on what stance to take, so they decided to send a personal envoy to the sister party to co-ordinate strategy. Epstein learned that the party was being rapidly "Arabized" and was taking a more and militant stand against the Zionists and the Yishuv in general. While in Palestine Epstein learned of the out break of the Spanish Civil War. Without waiting for word from the party or Freiheit he sailed to Barcelona and became one of the first American journalists on the scene. He stayed in Spain for three months sending dispatches back to Freiheit from the front lines.

== Post-communist years ==
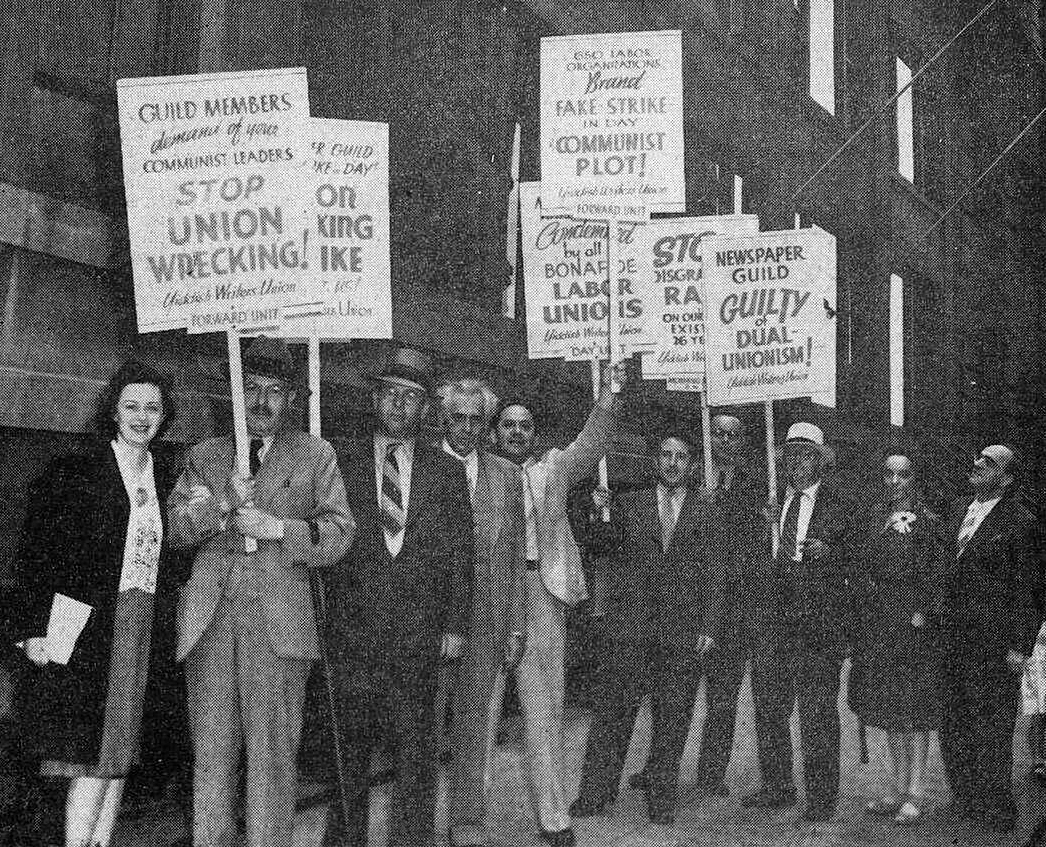
Epstein (far right) amongst Jewish writers picketing the Newspaper Guild for alleged Communist sympathies, 1941

Melech Epstein broke with the party in August, 1939 after the Nazi-Soviet pact. This was the final event which sealed his disillusionment with the party, though he had been having misgivings for a decade since the beginning of the Third Period and then the show trials in the late 1930s. He went off to Mexico where he visited Leon Trotsky and Diego Riviera. When he came back to America he briefly joined the staff of The Forward, but was fired soon after because he wouldn't go before the Dies committee or write sensationalistic material about the Communist Party. In 1943 he was hired by the Jewish Labor Committee to go on fund raising tours for the underground Jewish resistance movement in Poland. Finally, in 1945 he became public relations director of the Cloakmakers Joint Board of ILGWU.

In the fall of 1947 he settled in Florida. There he wrote his two major books Jewish labor in U.S.A. and The Jew and communism, independently published through a "Trade Union Sponsoring Committee" which was partly funded by ILGWU.

== Works ==
=== Yiddish ===
- סאקא־װאנזעטי : די געשיכטע פון זײער מארטירערטום Saḳo-Ṿanzeṭi di geshikhṭe fun zeyer marṭirerṭum Nyu Yorḳ : Aroysgegebn fun der Yidisher seḳtsye ṿorḳers (ḳomunisṭishe) parṭey 1927
- אמעריקע : דער אינדוסטריעלער קריזיס און די רעװאליוציאניזירונג פון ארבעטער־קלאס. Ameriḳe: der indust̥rieler ḳrizis un di reṿolyutsyonizirung fun arbeṭer-ḳlas. Nyu Yorḳ : Inṭernatsyonaler arbeṭer ordn 1930
- סאוועטן־פארבאנד בויט סאציאליזם ווי אזוי דער פינף־יאר פלאן רופט זיך אפ אויף אלע געביטן פון לעבן / Soṿeṭn-Farband boyṭ sotsyalim ṿi azoy der finf-yor plan rufṭ zikh op oyf ale gebiṭn fun lebn Nyu Yorḳ : Inṭernatsyonaler arbeṭer ordn 1931
- די געשיכטע פון ארבעטער-קלאס אין אמעריקע Vol. 1, די געשיכטע פון ארבעטער-קלאס אין אמעריקע Vol. 2 Di geshikhṭe fun arbeṭer-ḳlas in Ameriḳe [New York] Farlag Internatsianaler Arbeter Ordn, 1935
- ישראל פײנבערג : קעמפער פאר פרײהײט און סאציאלער גערעכטיקײט Yiśrael Faynberg ḳemfer far frayhayṭ un sotsyaler gerekhṭiḳayṭ Nyu-Yorḳ : [o. fg.]

=== English ===
- May Day, 1934 New York City: Communist Party, New York District,
- Israel Feinberg, fighter for freedom and social justice New York : Lerman Pub. Co., 1948
- Jewish labor in U.S.A.; an industrial, political and cultural history of the Jewish labor movement.Vol. I 1882–1914. New York, Trade Union Sponsoring Committee 1950
- Jewish labor in U.S.A.; an industrial, political and cultural history of the Jewish labor movement. Vol. II 1914–1952. New York, Trade Union Sponsoring Committee 1953
- The Jew and communism; the story of early Communist victories and ultimate defeats in the Jewish community, U.S.A., 1919-1941. New York, Trade Union Sponsoring Committee 1959
- Profiles of eleven; profiles of eleven men who guided the destiny of an immigrant society and stimulated social consciousness among the American people. Detroit, Wayne State University Press, 1965
- Pages from a colorful life; an autobiographical sketch (1971).
- Random thoughts of a dying man Miami Beach, Fla., Jetti Epstein, 1979
