= Hobo News =

Newspaper in St. Louis, Missouri

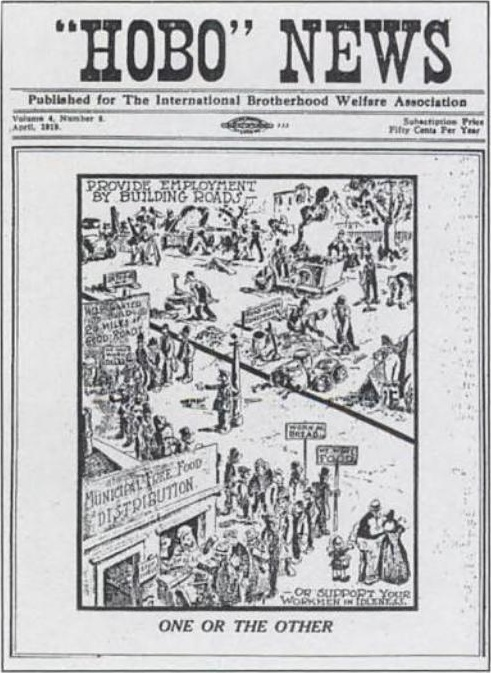
Cover of the "Hobo" News in the late 1910s

Hobo News, alternately "Hobo" News, was an early 20th-century newspaper for homeless migrant workers (hobos). It was published in St. Louis, Missouri, and Cincinnati by the International Brotherhood Welfare Association (IBWA) and its founder James Eads How. Hobo News was important for legitimatizing the hobo identity and has been credited as a predecessor to the modern street newspaper movement.

== Original newspaper ==
Hobo News was published monthly with 16 pages and no advertisements, and was distributed by street sellers for five cents in bohemian areas. A subscription was 50 cents annually. In 1919, it was raised to ten cents per issue or one dollar per year. At its height, Hobo News reached a circulation of 20,000.

The newspaper's slogan was "Of the hoboes, by the hoboes and for the hoboes", and reader submissions formed a significant part of the paper. Content included poems, essays, travelogues, and articles about the life and lore of hobos, as well as news about labor organizing and unemployment. Recurring writers included John X. Kelly, Nicholas Klein, and William Schweitzer. More famous were Nina van Zandt Spies (widow of August Spies), Voltairine de Cleyre, and Eugene Debs. Future comic book legend John Buscema contributed some artwork. It was mostly read by the hobos themselves but sometimes sold to the public as a way for the homeless to make money without begging, much like a modern street paper.

Hobo News went by several names over the years. It was founded in 1913 as Hoboes Jungle Scout then adopted the name Hobo News from 1915 to at least 1929. After World War I and the U.S. government attacks on the radical Industrial Workers of the World many IWW supporters (Wobblies) joined the IBWA, and Hobo News became more radical and socialist. This caused trouble with the government, and the paper lost its second-class mailing privileges. There was an internal rift, and eventually Hobo World was started as a radical competitor. Accounts of the relations between the two vary, describing Hobo World as either a "competitor" to Hobo News, a different name for the same paper, or a replacement for it.

Much of Hobo News was never archived. The New York Public Library has 19 issues ending in 1923. The St. Louis Public Library has 63 issues, starting with volume I, number I (April 1915). It is unclear what became of the newspaper after How died in 1930.

== Second newspaper: The Hobo News ==
A 1946 issue of The Hobo News (1936–1948)

A second paper named Hobo News was published from 1936 to 1948 in New York City; The paper was brought back into existence through financing arranged by Garry A. Stolzberg, a banker with the Modern Industrial Bank in New York City. Its highest circulation was 50,000, and it was published by Ben "Coast Kid" (Hobo) Benson and under the direction of Pat "The Roaming Dreamer" Mulkern. It contained advice for hobos, opinion pieces, cartoons, etc., and was sold for ten cents on street corners. When it went under in 1948 it was replaced by Bowery News (named after the Bowery area in Manhattan), but that paper was short-lived.

== See also ==
- List of street newspapers
