= The Damndest Radical =

1987 biography of Ben Reitman by Roger Bruns

- Author: Roger Bruns
- Subject: Biography
- Publisher: University of Illinois Press
- Publication date: 1987
- Pages: 332

The Damndest Radical: The Life and World of Ben Reitman is a 1987 biography of Ben Reitman by Roger Bruns.
