= A. G. C. Bierer =

Oklahoma judge (1862–1951)

- Born: Andrew Gregg Curtin Bierer; October 26, 1862; Uniontown, Pennsylvania
- Died: February 21, 1951; Guthrie, Oklahoma
- Occupations: attorney, politician, judge, Supreme Court Justice, banker
- Years active: 1877-1951
- Notable work: Associate Justice, Oklahoma Territory Supreme Court

Andrew Gregg Curtin Bierer(October 24, 1862 – February 21, 1951), more often written as A. G. C. Bierer, was a judge in Oklahoma Territory who served as an associate justice of the Territorial Supreme Court between 1894 and 1898.

== Early life and education ==
Bierer was born in Uniontown, Pennsylvania on October 24, 1862 to a family of German descent. His father was Everard Bierer (1827–1910) and his mother was Ellen (née Smouse) Bierer (1832–1913). He was named for Andrew Gregg Curtin, who was a friend of the family.

His father and grandfather were both staunch Democrats and passed their political beliefs down to the son and grandson. The family migrated to Hiawatha, Kansas in 1865, where young Bierer was raised and graduated from high school.

After completing high school, Bierer began studying law. He was then admitted to the bar, then enrolled in the Georgetown University Law School in the District of Columbia, where he earned the Master of Arts degree in law in 1886. Moving to Garden City, Kansas, he built up a law practice (Brown, Bierer and Cotteral) and married Miss Nannie Stamper in 1888. In 1887, he ran for the position of Judge of the District Court. (Note: His biography says that five of the twelve counties normally had a Republican majority of 3,500. It also asserts that Bierer lost the election because of "political trickery.") He was appointed city attorney for Garden City in 1889 and served until he moved to Guthrie, Oklahoma (then known as Oklahoma Territory) in 1891.

== Oklahoma Territory Supreme Court ==
Bierer was appointed as City Attorney shortly after moving to Guthrie, and served for one year. He then established the law firm Bierer and Cotteral, which became noted for the number of its members who went on to occupy high judicial positions. (Note: One historian, James Logan, wrote that the two men spent most of their working hours in the Guthrie land office. This source claimed that most such lawyers were derisively called "land office lawyers" and had a very low reputation in the eyes of the public. Land office lawyers were regarded as having only enough legal knowledge to draw up homesteading documents and to contest claims against them. They were not even considered as members of the bar. Logan said that this was not true of Bierer and Cotteral, who were "... gentlemen of honor and ability." Logan also noted that Bierer was "...easily the best educated of all the territorial judges.")

Bierer himself was appointed an associate justice of the Oklahoma Territory Supreme Court in 1894, for a term ending in 1898. (Note: Bierer was recommended to President Grover Cleveland by an unidentified Georgetown University law professor.) James R. Keaton, who succeeded Bierer as head of the law firm, was also appointed to the Supreme Court in 1896. John H. Cotteral, the junior partner, was appointed United States District Judge for the Western District of Oklahoma in 1907.

Bierer stepped down from the court on February 16, 1898. He was succeeded by Bayard T. Hainer of Guthrie.

== Post Supreme Court ==
According to author Michael J. Hightower, Bierer was a stockholder and attorney for the Bank of Indian Territory in 1911, when he got into a physical confrontation with a number of state banking inspectors who dropped in one morning to demand an emergency audit. Otherwise they would close the bank. Bierer called them, "... a set of thieves and burglars, and I dare you to try to close this bank."

Assistant State Banking Commissioner, R. L. Garnett, who was part of the group, attached a closure notice to the cashier's window and announced, "This bank is closed." Bierer swore again, ripped down the notice and stuffed it into his pocket. (Note: Other members of the inspection group were A. C. Cruce, brother of the Oklahoma governor and a representative of the state banking board, and Frank M. Canton, adjutant general of the national guard and reputedly one of the fastest and surest shots in the state.) Unsure what to do with this man who was ready to defend his business with fisticuffs, the group apparently left without the audit it had demanded.

After his term on the Supreme Court expired, Bierer returned to private business, working with Frank Dale, another former justice of the Oklahoma Territory Supreme Court. In 1925, A. G. C. Bierer joined with his son, A. G. C. Bierer Jr., to form a new law firm, Bierer and Bierer, in Guthrie.

== Death ==
Judge Bierer died at his home in Guthrie on February 21, 1951. His survivors were: A. G. C. Bierer Jr. (son) Mrs. Horace Taylor (daughter), and two grandsons, A. G. C. Bierer III and Alva McDonald Bierer. He was buried in Guthrie's Summit View Cemetery.
