= Nels Anderson =

American sociologist (1889–1986)

- Born: July 31, 1889; Chicago, IL
- Died: October 8, 1986 (aged 97)
- Other names: Dean Stiff
- Occupation: Sociologist

Nels Anderson (July 31, 1889 – October 8, 1986) was an early American sociologist who studied hobos, urban culture, and work culture.

== Biography ==
Anderson studied at the University of Chicago under Robert E. Park and Ernest Burgess, whose Concentric zone model was one of the earliest models developed to explain the organization of urban areas. Anderson's first publication, The Hobo (1923), was a work that used participant observation as a research method. It was the first field research monograph of the Chicago School of Sociology.

Anderson received his doctorate from New York University and taught at Columbia University from 1928 to 1934, when he became a civil servant. He worked as a public servant both in Washington, D.C. and abroad, mainly with agencies for work and welfare until 1953. He continued to publish work on hobos and the homeless under the alias Dean Stiff. In an autobiographical sequence of articles entitled "Sociology has Many Faces", he wrote that no matter where he was working during these 30 years of being in non-academic sociology work, he always felt he was using and applying his sociological knowledge.

During the war, he served in the Middle and Near East with merchant marine personnel. Following the war, he worked as labor relations expert in Germany. At age 65, he returned to research, invigorating social research in Germany and eventually becoming head of the UNESCO Institute for Social Science at Cologne, from 1953 to 1962. In 1965, he joined the Department of Sociology at the University of New Brunswick, where he served as a professor until 1977.

Throughout his career, Dr. Anderson's research focused on issues of contemporary relevance such as healthy cities and marginalized people.

A conference celebrating the 85th anniversary of the publication of The Hobo was held in May 2008.

== Bibliography ==
- Anderson, Nels (1923). The Hobo: The Sociology of the Homeless Man. Chicago: University of Chicago Press. pp. 296. ISBN 0-7581-2355-8.
- Anderson, Nels (1928). Urban Sociology. New York: Knopf. pp. 414.
- Stiff, Dean (1931). The Milk and Honey Route: A Handbook for Hobos. New York: Vanguard Press.
- Anderson, Nels (1938). Right to Work. New York: Modern Age Books. p. 152.
- Anderson, Nels (1940). Men on the Move. Chicago: University of Chicago Press.
- Anderson, Nels (1942). Desert Saints: The Mormon Frontier in Utah. Chicago: University of Chicago Press.
- Anderson, Nels (1956). Studies of the family. Tübingen: Mohr.
- Anderson, Nels (1959). The Urban Community: A World Perspective. New York: Holt, Rinehart and Winston.
- Anderson, Nels (1961). Work and Leisure: A Perceptive Inquiry Into Current Ways of Using Time. London: Routledge.
- Anderson, Nels (1964). Dimensions of Work: The Sociology of a Work Culture. New York: David McKay.
- Anderson, Nels (1964). Urbanism and Urbanization. Leiden: E. J. Brill.
- Anderson, Nels (1969). Studies in Multilingualism. Leiden: E.J. Brill.
- Anderson, Nels (1971). The Industrial Urban Community: Historical and Comparative Perspectives. New York: Appleton-Century-Crofts. ISBN 978-0390031013.
- Anderson, Nels (1974). Man's Work and Leisure. Leiden: E.J. Brill.
- Anderson, Nels (1975). The American Hobo: an Autobiography. Leiden: E.J. Brill. p. 192. ISBN 90-04-04191-5.
- Anderson, Nels (1998). On Hobos and Homelessness. Chicago: University of Chicago Press. pp. 301. ISBN 0-226-01967-5.
