= Irwin St. John Tucker =

American priest and activist (1886–1982)

- Church: Episcopal Church
- Diocese: Chicago

Orders
- Ordination: June 1912

Personal details
- Born: January 10, 1886 Mobile, Alabama, US
- Died: January 8, 1982 (aged 95) Chicago, Illinois, US
- Denomination: Anglican
- Parents: Gardiner C. Tucker
- Education: General Theological Seminary

Irwin St. John Tucker (January 10, 1886 – January 8, 1982) was an American priest of the Episcopal Church and a socialist activist. Born in Mobile, Alabama, he served as priest-in-charge of St. Stephen's Church in Chicago. He also served as pastor for St. Mark's Church in the Bowery. He was an avowed socialist. In January 1915, he was jailed for one night in connection with the Haymarket Riots. He contributed to the Chicago Herald-American and served as one of the founders of the Hobo College.

== Early life ==
Irwin St. John Tucker was born on January 10, 1886, in the rectory of St. John's Church in Mobile, Alabama. His father, the Rev. Gardiner C. Tucker, was the long-time rector of that church. The Tuckers had long been a prominent family in the Episcopal Church and in the American South broadly. Indeed, the Tuckers and Dandridges were founding families of Virginia. He counted among his notable relatives Presiding Bishop of the Episcopal Church Henry St. George Tucker, Congressman Henry St. George Tucker, Sr., bishop Beverley Dandridge Tucker, journalist Nathaniel Beverley Tucker, author Nathaniel Beverley Tucker, politician John Randolph Tucker, Congressman Henry St. George Tucker, III, and judge St. George Tucker. This instilled in him a desire to emulate his family, especially his father, and pursue a ministerial career in the Episcopal Church.

He was educated in Mobile public schools, graduating at the age of 15 from high school in 1901.

== Career ==
Tucker's journalism career began in 1902 when he joined the staff of The Item; a now defunct newspaper in New Orleans. He worked as a reporter or editor for various papers in both the American North and South. In 1906 he relocated to Chicago when he joined the staff of the Chicago Inter Ocean, but left there after a short period to pursue training as a minister in New York City where he became ordained in 1909 in the Episcopal church. In 1914, he became an associate editor of The Christian Socialist in Chicago.

== Espionage Act and Supreme Court cases ==
The United States joined World War I on April 6, 1917. Tucker became active in disseminating anti-war propaganda and wrote several pamphlets, including "The Price We Pay" and the satirical "Why We Should Fight" in April and May 1917, respectively.

On June 15, 1917, Congress passed the Espionage Act. The Act made it illegal to "willfully obstruct the recruiting or enlistment service of the United States".

On February 2, 1918, a grand jury in the Northern District of Illinois indicted Tucker, Victor L. Berger, William F. Kruse, and J. Louis Engdahl under section 3 of Title I of the Act. The trial commenced on December 9, 1918, and on January 8, 1919, the jury returned a verdict of guilty for all five defendants. Judge Kenesaw Mountain Landis sentenced each to imprisonment in the federal penitentiary in Leavenworth, Kansas, for twenty years. The defendants appealed and the case went to the Supreme Court.

In Pierce v. United States, the Supreme Court upheld their conviction. The case was argued November 18–19, 1919, and decided March 8, 1920.

In Berger v. United States, the defendants accused Judge Landis of personal bias against those of German heritage. Tucker himself was not German nor of recent German ancestry, but his defense argued that they were "impleased" with Berger, Kruse and Germer and that Landis thereby was prejudiced toward the others in the group by extension. The case was argued December 9, 1920 and decided January 31, 1921, in favor of Tucker and the other defendants. Tucker served no time in prison.

== Personal life ==
He married Ellen Dorothy O'Reilly, an illustrator, on July 4, 1914. They had at least 1 child, a son. He died in Chicago on January 8, 1982, at the age of 95.

Busy Philipps has claimed him as a great-grandfather.
