= Ben Reitman =

American anarchist and physician to the poor (1879–1943)

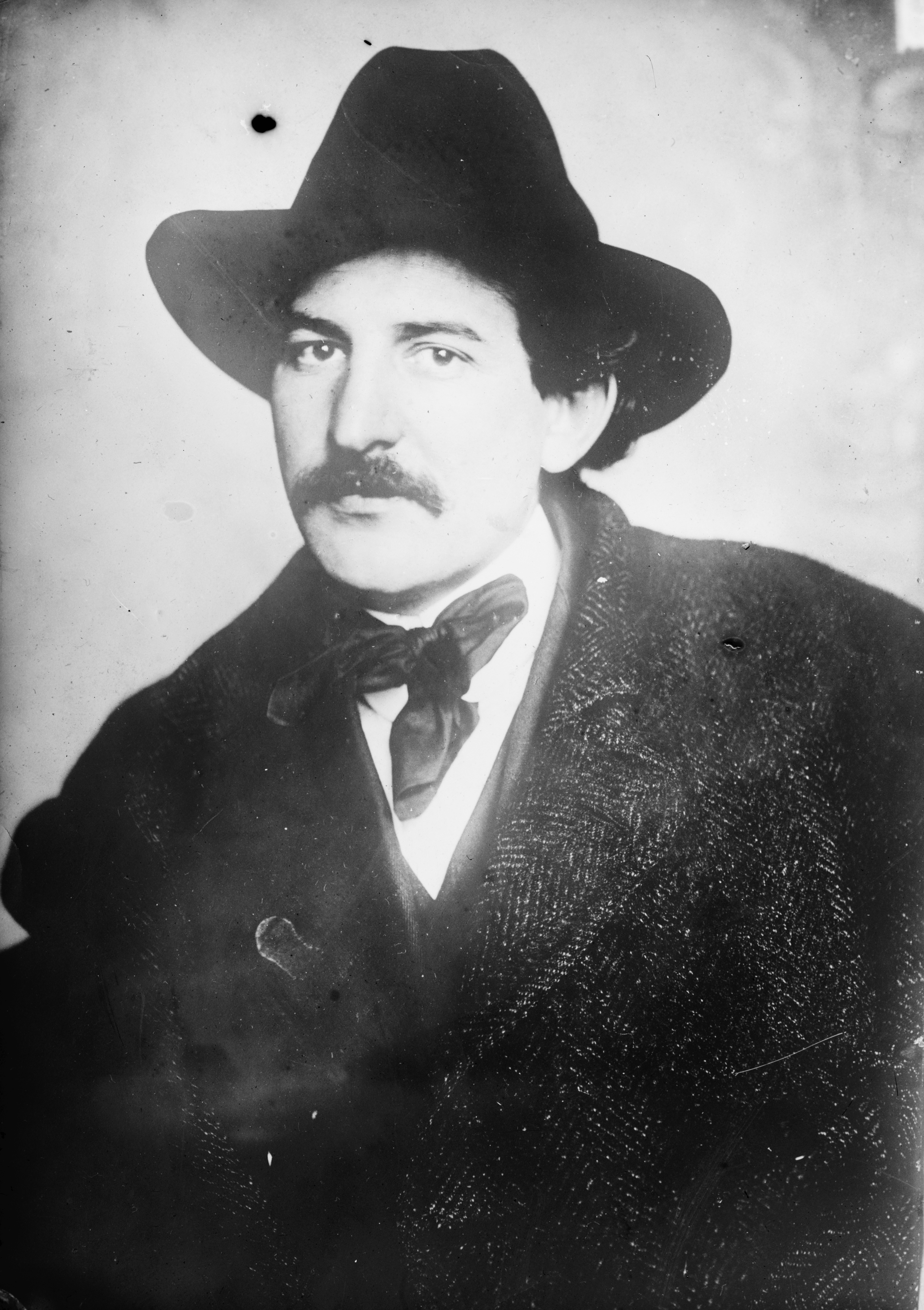
- Ben Reitman
- Born: Ben Lewis Reitman; 1879; Saint Paul, Minnesota, US
- Died: 1943 (aged 63–64); Chicago, Illinois, US
- Occupations: Physician, hobo
- Known for: Lover of Emma Goldman
- Notable work: Sister of the Road: The Autobiography of Boxcar Bertha (1937)
- Spouse(s): Mae Schwartz; Anna Martindale; Rose Siegal; Medina Rivets Oliver
- Partner(s): Emma Goldman; Eileen O'Connor

Ben Lewis Reitman M.D. (1879–1943) was an American anarchist and physician to the poor, for which he was nicknamed the hobo doctor. He is best remembered today as a lover of fellow anarchist Emma Goldman. Martin Scorsese's 1972 feature film Boxcar Bertha is based on Sister of the Road, one of Reitman's books.

== Biography ==
Reitman was born in Saint Paul, Minnesota, to poor Russian Jewish immigrants in 1879, and grew up in Chicago. At the age of twelve, he became a hobo, but returned to Chicago and worked in the Polyclinic Laboratory as a "laboratory boy". In 1900, he entered the College of Physicians and Surgeons in Chicago, completing his medical studies in 1904. During this time he was briefly married; he and his wife had a daughter together. His wife was Mae Schwartz, and their daughter was Jan Gay (born Helen Reitman), the author, nudism advocate, and founder of the nudist Out-of-Door Club at Highland, New York.

He worked as a physician in Chicago, choosing to offer services to hobos, prostitutes, the poor, and other outcasts. Notably, he performed abortions, which were illegal at the time. In 1907, Reitman became known as "King of the Hobos" when he opened a Chicago branch of the Hobo College, which became the largest of the International Brotherhood Welfare Association centers for migrant education, political organizing, and social services.

His eyes were brown, large, and dreamy. His lips, disclosing beautiful teeth when he smiled, were full and passionate. He looked a handsome brute. His hands, narrow and white, exerted a peculiar fascination. His finger-nails, like his hair, seemed to be on strike against soap and brush. I could not take my eyes off his hands. A strange charm seemed to emanate from them, caressing and stirring... Emma Goldman on Reitman in Living My Life, Volume 1

Reitman met Emma Goldman in 1908, when he offered her use of the college's Hobo Hall for a speech, and the two began a love affair, which Goldman described as the "Great Grand Passion" of her life. The two traveled together for almost eight years, working for the causes of birth control, free speech, worker's rights, and anarchism.

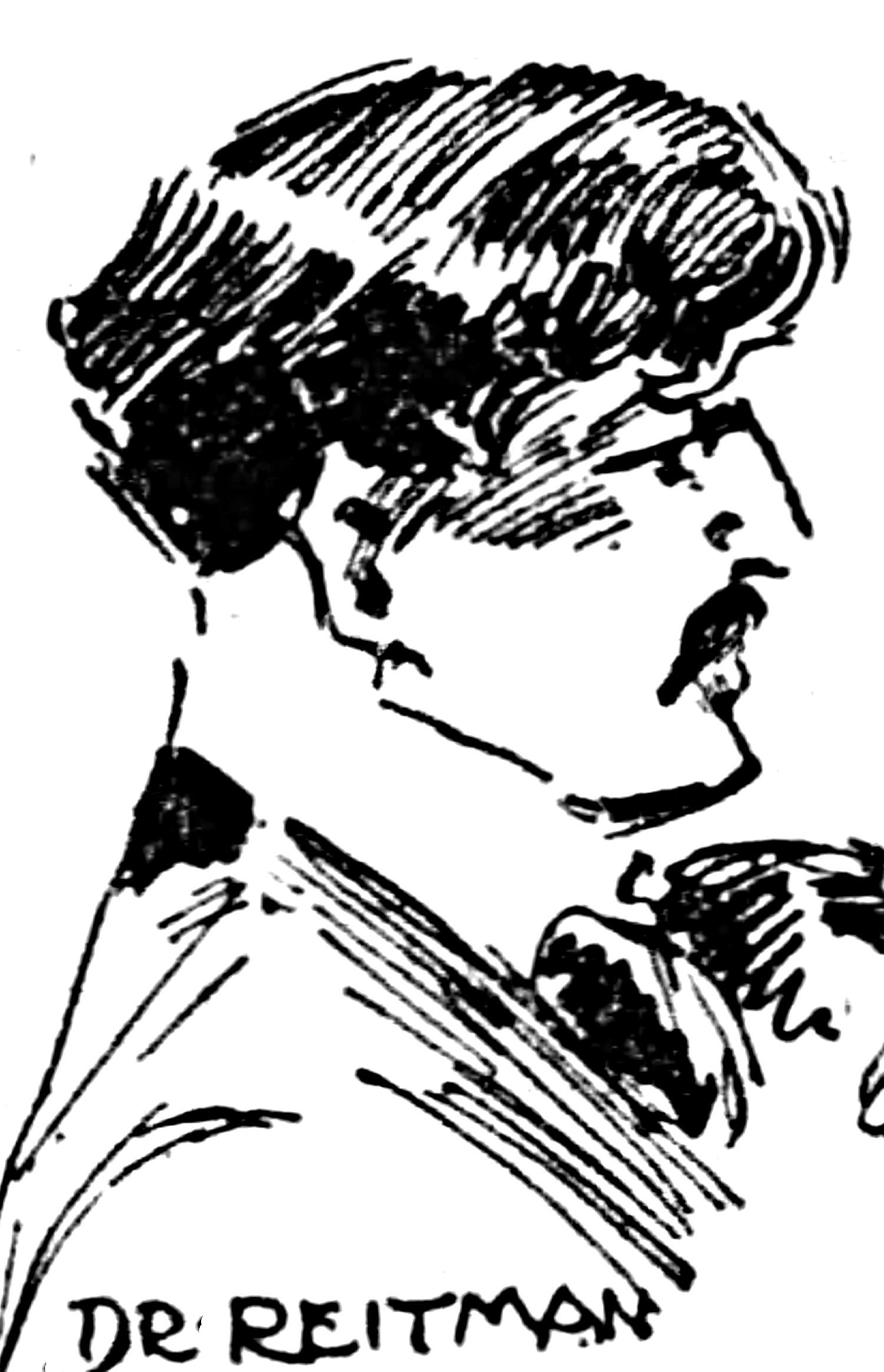
Sketch by Marguerite Martyn, 1910

During this time, the couple became involved in the San Diego free speech fight in 1912–13. Reitman was kidnapped by a mob, severely beaten, tarred and feathered, branded with "I.W.W.," and his rectum and testicles were abused. Several years later, the couple were arrested in 1916 under the Comstock laws for advocating birth control, and Reitman served six months in prison.

Both believed in free love, but Reitman's practice incited feelings of jealousy in Goldman. He remarried when one of his lovers became pregnant; their son was born while he was in prison. Goldman and Reitman ended their relationship in 1917, after Reitman was released from prison.

Reitman returned to Chicago, ultimately working with the City of Chicago, establishing the Chicago Society for the Prevention of Venereal Disease in the 1930s. His second wife died in 1930, and Reitman married a third time, to Rose Siegal. Reitman later became seriously involved with Medina Oliver, and the couple had four daughters – Mecca, Medina, Victoria, and Olive.

Reitman died in Chicago of a heart attack at the age of sixty-three. He was buried at the Waldheim Cemetery (now Forest Home Cemetery), in Forest Park, Illinois.

== Works by Reitman ==
- The Second Oldest Profession - A Study of the Prostitute's "Business Manager" (1931) (A sociological study of pimps)
- Sister of the Road: The Autobiography of Boxcar Bertha (1937) (fiction)

== See also ==
- Birth control movement in the United States

== Works cited ==
- Frank O. Beck, Hobohemia: Emma Goldman, Lucy Parsons, Ben Reitman & Other Agitators & Outsiders In 1920s/30s Chicago (Charles H. Kerr Press, 2000, ISBN 978-0-88286-251-4 (description)
- Roger Bruns, The Damndest Radical: The Life and World of Ben Reitman, Chicago's Celebrated Social Reformer, Hobo King, and Whorehouse Physician (University of Illinois, 2001)
- Mecca Reitman Carpenter, No Regrets: Dr. Ben Reitman and the Women Who Loved Him (SouthSide Press, 1996) (biographical memoir by Reitman's daughter)
- Emma Goldman, Living My Life (1931)
- University of Illinois at Chicago, University Library, "Ben Reitman Biographical Sketch", Reitman papers.
- Alice Wexler, Emma Goldman: An Intimate Life. New York: Pantheon Books, 1984. ISBN 0-394-52975-8. Republished as Emma Goldman in America. Boston: Beacon Press, 1984. ISBN 0-8070-7003-3.
- Tim Cresswell, The Tramp in America. London: Reaktion Books, 2001. ISBN 1-86189-069-9.
