= William F. Kruse =

American socialist politician (1894–1979)

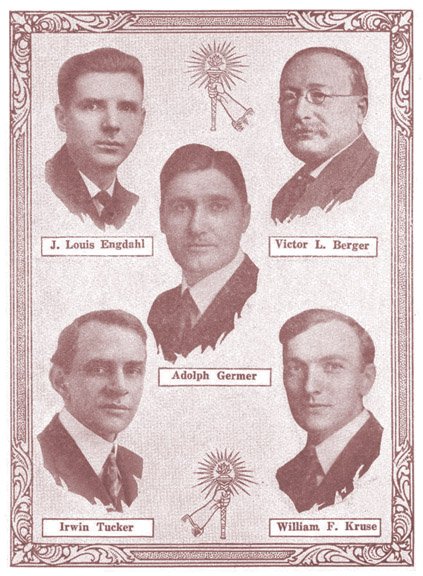
William F. Kruse was one of 5 top Socialist Party leaders targeted by the U.S. Department of Justice in 1919.

William F. Kruse (1894–1979) was an important head of the Young People's Socialist League (YPSL) in the 1910s. He was a member of the Socialist Party of America until 1921, acting as a leader of the party's Left Wing faction, loyal to the Third International (Comintern). Thereafter he joined the Workers Party of America, serving as assistant executive secretary of the WPA from the time of its foundation in December 1921.

== Biography ==
=== Early years ===
Kruse was born in Hoboken, New Jersey to German and Danish immigrant parents in 1894.

Kruse worked briefly as a sheet metal worker in his youth. He later studied at the Socialist Party of America's Rand School of Social Science under Algernon Lee.

=== Political career ===
In July 1915, the governing National Executive Committee of the SPA appointed the 21-year-old as director of the party's youth section, the Young People's Socialist League (YPSL). Kruse served two terms in this position, finishing in June 1918. He also served as editor of the YPSL's national publication, Young Socialists' Magazine, from 1918 to 1919 and as the Provisional Secretary of the SPA's national Socialist Sunday School movement.

Kruse was the fraternal delegate of the YPSL to the party's seminal 1917 Emergency National Convention in St. Louis. Militantly opposed to the war in Europe, Kruse, a law school graduate, worked to defend the civil rights of war opponents as a leader of the American Liberty Defense League.

As head of the Socialist Party's youth organization and a vociferous critic of American participation in the war, Kruse was targeted by the US Department of Justice headed by Attorney General A. Mitchell Palmer under the Espionage Act. Kruse was indicted in Chicago by a grand jury on Feb. 2, 1918, and the secret indictment was made public on March 9. The sensational and widely publicized trial of Kruse and 4 other top members of the Socialist Party began before Judge Kenesaw Mountain Landis on Dec. 6, 1918. This trial ended Jan. 4, 1919, with the jury finding Kruse and his associates (Victor L. Berger, Adolph Germer, J. Louis Engdahl, Irwin St. John Tucker) guilty. Landis sentenced each to 20 years in the Federal penitentiary, a sentence which was appealed and later overturned on the basis of judicial bias.

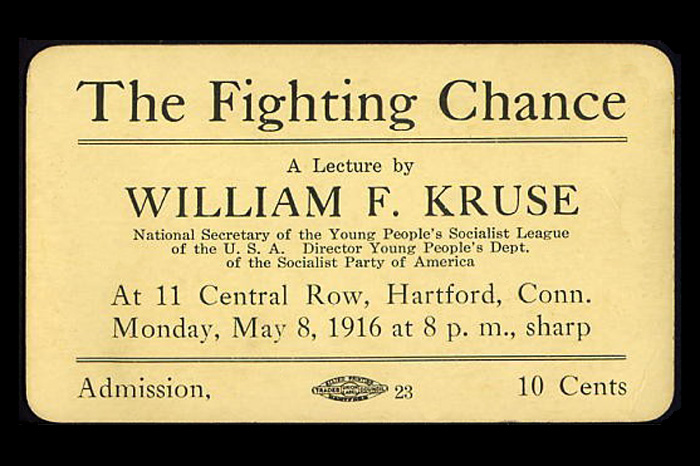
As head of the Young People's Socialist League, Bill Kruse was a frequent speaker on the Socialist Party's lecture circuit.

Released on bond, Kruse continued as a contributing editor of Young Socialists' Magazine from March 1919. He was a delegate to the 1919 Emergency National Convention of the SPA in August 1919, representing a Left Wing voice on the floor, but refusing to bolt the convention to join the Communist Labor Party of America gathering downstairs. Kruse was elected to serve on a new party institution to oversee controversial personnel decisions of the NEC, the Board of Appeals, and he continued in this role on this largely unused body until 1920. In September 1919, with the YPSL moving to organizational independence under its secretary, Oliver Carlson, Kruse was named head of the SPA's new "Young People's Department." He also resumed editorship of Young Socialists' Magazine, now back under party control. Kruse also worked as a National Organizer for the SPA, rebuilding the Rhode Island state organization, among other tasks.

Kruse was a Socialist candidate for the US House of Representatives from the Illinois 6th C.D. in 1918 and again 1920, and for Illinois Secretary of State in 1921.

From 1926 to 1927, Kruse was among the first Americans to study at the Comintern's Lenin School in Moscow, where he also served in an informal capacity as a lieutenant of the Lovestone faction in the USSR. Upon his return in 1927, Kruse was appointed by the CEC as District Organizer of the Communist Party's important Chicago district.

In 1928 Kruse stood as the candidate for Governor of Illinois of the Workers (Communist) Party.

=== Kruse and Instructional Technology ===
Kruse worked for Bell and Howell for 17 years heading up several departments. He was an advertising representative for Educational Screen and Audiovisual Guide for a number of years and was appointed archivist of the DAVI in 1955 where he ended up holding many roles in the Department of Audio Visual Instruction.

The AECT archive at the University of Maryland contains a copy of Kruse's unpublished book, The Projected Image. A portion of this book was published in The Journal of Society of Motion Picture and Television Engineers under the title Willard Beach Cook-Pioneer Distributor of Narrow-Gage Safety Films and Equipment.

== Works ==
- In the United States Circuit Court of Appeals for the Seventh Circuit. October term, A.D. 1918. Victor L. Berger, Adolph Germer, William F. Kruse, Irwin St. John Tucker and J. Louis Engdahl, plaintiffs in error, vs. United States of America, defendant in error. Error to the District Court of the United States for the Northern District of Illinois, Eastern Division, K.M. Landis, Judge ... Brief for the plaintiffs in error. With Messrs. Berger, Germer, Tucker, and Engdahl. Chicago: The Court, 1919.
- 100 years — For What? Being the Addresses of Victor L. Berger, Adolph Germer, J. Louis Engdahl, William F. Kruse and Irwin St. John Tucker to the Court that Sentenced Them to Serve 100 years in Prison. With Messrs. Berger, Germer, Tucker, and Engdahl. Chicago: National Office, Socialist Party, n.d. [1919].
- "Socialists, Prepare!" The Socialist World (Chicago), vol. 1, no. 5 (November 15, 1920), pp. 4–5.

== See also ==
- Benjamin Gitlow, founding member of the Communist Party USA
