= May Walden =

American socialist (1865–1960)

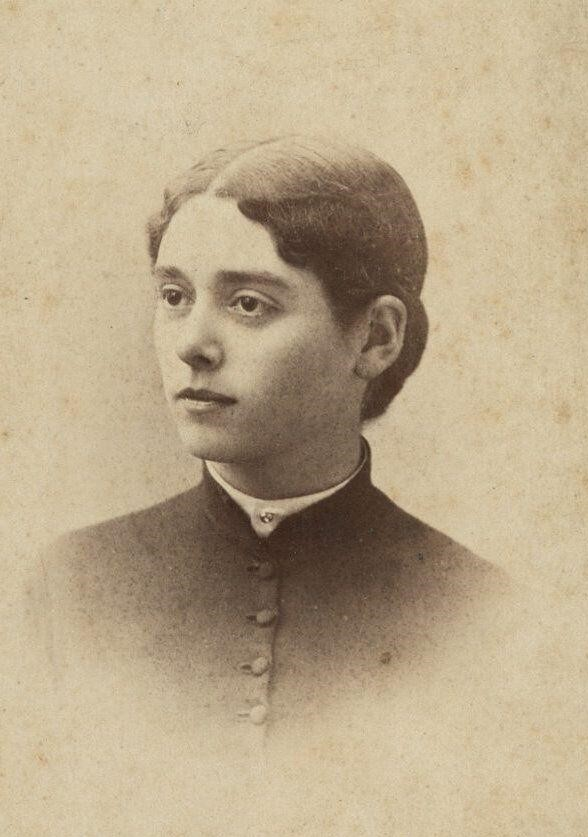
- Walden in 1885
- Born: Lillie May Walden; September 3, 1865; Metamora, Illinois, U.S.
- Died: May 6, 1960 (aged 94); Avon Park, Florida, U.S.
- Other name: May Walden Kerr
- Education: University of Illinois Urbana-Champaign
- Occupations: Activist; writer; speaker
- Known for: Socialist writing and organizing
- Political party: Socialist Party of America
- Spouse: Charles H. Kerr (m. 1892; div. 1904)
- Children: 2

Signature
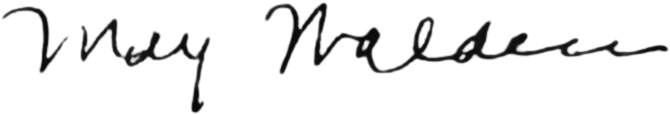

Lillie May Walden (September 3, 1865 – May 6, 1960), also known by her married name May Walden Kerr, was an American socialist activist, writer, and speaker. She was active in the Socialist Party of America in Chicago and Florida. She authored pamphlets and articles, and delivered speeches, on women's rights, social justice, peace, and socialism.

== Early life ==
Walden was born in Metamora, Illinois, on September 3, 1865, the daughter of Theoron Walden and Elizabeth Walden (née Gribling). Her father was an American Civil War veteran who opened a general store and watch repair shop in Metamora in the early 1860s after being discharged from the army because of disability.

Walden became involved in social activism at sixteen, when she joined the Woman's Christian Temperance Union. She was educated in the Metamora schools and was a member of the first class to graduate from Metamora High School, in 1884.

She entered the University of Illinois Urbana-Champaign, but returned home after her family moved to Highlands, North Carolina. According to her obituary, she attended the university for one year and wanted to continue to graduation, but was prevented from doing so by her parents; it added that she retained "an insatiable thirst for knowledge" throughout her life. In 1885, she returned to Metamora with her mother.

Walden later moved to Chicago. She worked briefly at the public library in Peoria and then at the U.S. Pension Office. Through a co-worker at the pension office, she met Charles H. Kerr, a publisher associated with liberal and socialist circles.

== Marriage and publishing circles ==
Walden and Kerr married at Jenkin Lloyd Jones's All Souls' Church on April 2, 1892. Through Kerr, Walden became connected with Unitarianism, reform publishing, and later socialism. In 1893, the couple moved to Glen Ellyn, Illinois. Their first child, Althea, was born in November 1892 and died at age four; their daughter Katharine was born in 1894.

Kerr began publishing the monthly magazine New Occasions in 1893, which was later replaced by the socialist periodical The New Time. Walden wrote columns and essays on the home, marriage, and the social position of women.

== Socialist activism ==
Woman and Socialism (1909)

Walden joined the socialist movement shortly before 1900, influenced in part by Algie M. Simons and May Wood Simons. She contributed to socialist periodicals and published pamphlets through Charles H. Kerr & Company, including Woman and Socialism and Socialism and the Home. Socialism and the Home was issued in 1900 as number 28 in the company's Pocket Library of Socialism series.

Walden's socialist writing linked women's domestic position to economic dependence. In Socialism and the Home, she argued that women could not be emancipated while they remained economically dependent on men, and presented socialism as a means of changing domestic life. Her writing criticised patriarchal marriage and connected women's subordination with legal and economic structures within the household.

Thomas Frederick Jorsch identifies Walden as one of the American socialists who adapted Marxist ideas about class struggle and historical development to American reform politics. Jorsch writes that Walden described Marx's material conception of history, class struggle, and surplus value as the "principles of international socialism". He also cites Walden's writing as an example of socialist arguments that a cooperative commonwealth would provide more time for education, recreation, and physical development, and would reduce crime by removing poverty and private control of property.

Walden spoke for the Socialist Party of Illinois and elsewhere. She also wrote for socialist newspapers and periodicals, including the Worker's Call, the Chicago Socialist, the Chicago Daily Socialist, and The Socialist Woman. During the spring and autumn of 1913, she travelled through southern and central Illinois speaking on behalf of the Socialist Party in contested elections.

== Later life and death ==
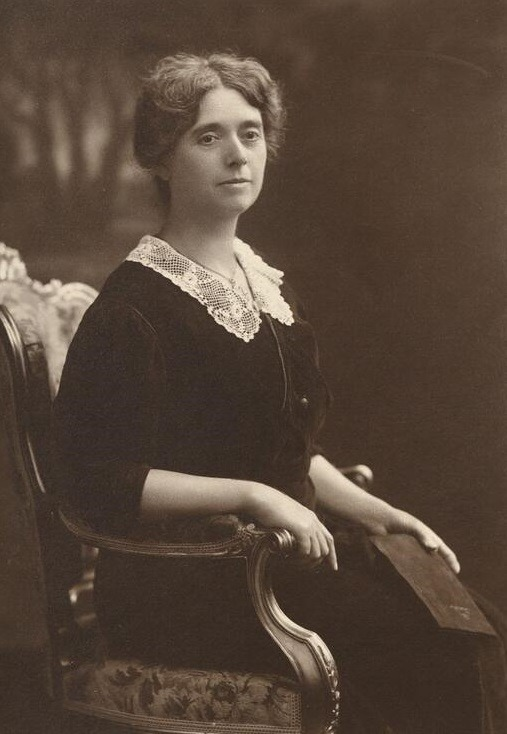
Walden in 1912

Walden and Charles H. Kerr divorced in 1904. Their separation followed political and personal tensions within Chicago socialist circles. According to Hester L. Furey, Kerr introduced Mary Marcy to another attendee at the May 1904 Socialist Party convention as his wife before his divorce from Walden had been finalised; Furey also notes that Walden continued to blame Marcy for the breakdown of the marriage decades later.

After the divorce, Walden remained in contact with socialist and reform writers. Donna L. Davey states that she became one of J. Howard Moore's closest friends and that the two corresponded for many years; Moore and his family also sometimes spent holidays with Walden and her daughter. Walden assumed primary responsibility for raising Katharine. She continued to write and lecture on women's rights, social justice, peace, and socialism, and remained active in socialist circles. For several years she travelled as a speaker for the Socialist Party and became known among women's groups. She worked on projects including the Political Refugee Defense League.

In December 1913, Walden left Chicago for the last time to assist her mother in Avon Park, Florida. She remained there for the rest of her life while continuing to write and correspond with socialist and reform circles.

Walden died suddenly of a heart attack on May 6, 1960, in Avon Park; she was 94. She was cremated, with arrangements made in Orlando, Florida.

== Archives ==
The Newberry Library holds the May Walden papers, a collection of 3.3 linear feet covering 1869–1972, with most of the material dating from 1892 to 1959. The collection includes correspondence, writings, diaries, clippings, photographs, memorabilia, and publications relating to the socialist movement.

== Publications ==
- Socialism and the Home (1901)
- Woman and Socialism (1909)

== See also ==
- History of socialism
- Socialist feminism
- Progressive Era
