= Socialist Party of Illinois =

The Socialist Party of Illinois (SPIL) is a political party in the state of Illinois. It was affiliated with the Socialist Party of America. It was founded in September 1901, though the grouping met in 1900 at a convention in Chicago and supported Eugene V. Debs for president in 1900. It was the successor to the Social Democratic Party of America.

In 1915, the party had 6,004 members. 44 party members held public office in that year, including one mayor, 18 aldermen and 2 members of the Illinois House of Representatives among others. The Chicago Socialist was the newspaper of the Socialist Party of Illinois.

The Chicago Socialist Party was the most active local in the SPIL and one of the most active in the United States. It is now an affiliate of the Socialist Party USA.

== Presidential nominee results ==
From 1904 to 1948, the SPIL placed its nominee for president on the Illinois ballot. In 1952 and 1956, the party's nominee was not on the ballot, nor has the party placed the SPUSA nominee on the ballot since it began running candidates again in 1976.

Year	Presidential Nominee	Vice-Presidential Nominee	Votes
1904	Eugene V. Debs	Benjamin Hanford	69,225 (6.43%)
1908	Eugene V. Debs	Benjamin Hanford	34,711 (3.00%)
1912	Eugene V. Debs	Emil Seidel	81,278 (7.09%)
1916	Allen L. Benson	George Ross Kirkpatrick	61,394 (2.80%)
1920	Eugene V. Debs	Seymour Stedman	74,747 (3.57%)
1924	Robert M. La Follette	Burton K. Wheeler	432,027 (17.49%)
1928	Norman Thomas	James H. Maurer	19,138 (0.62%)
1932	Norman Thomas	James H. Maurer	67,258 (1.97%)
1936	Norman Thomas	George A. Nelson	7,530 (0.19%)
1940	Norman Thomas	Maynard C. Krueger	10,914 (0.26%)
1944	Norman Thomas	Darlington Hoopes	180 (0.00%)
1948	Norman Thomas	Tucker P. Smith	11,522 (0.29%)

== Notable members ==
- Roy E. Burt, National Secretary and 1932 candidate for Governor
- J. Louis Engdahl, 1918 candidate for Congress
- Isaac Edward Ferguson, civil rights attorney
- Adolph Germer, National Secretary and multi-time candidate
- Charles V. Johnson, member of the Chicago City Council from 1917 to 1919
- John C. Kennedy, member of the Chicago City Council from 1915 to 1919 and 1912 candidate for Governor
- Charles H. Kerr, Party Secretary (1902)
- George Ross Kirkpatrick, 1916 candidate for vice president and 1928 candidate for United States Senate
- Maynard C. Krueger, 1940 candidate for Vice President
- William F. Kruse, 1921 candidate for Secretary of State
- William Bross Lloyd, 1918 candidate for United States Senate
- Christian M. Madsen, member of the Illinois House of Representatives from 1913 to 1917
- Joseph Mason, member of the Illinois House of Representatives from 1913 to 1917
- Thomas J. Morgan, labor leader and multi-time candidate
- Joseph Medill Patterson, journalist
- William E. Rodriguez, member of the Chicago City Council from 1915 to 1918
- Algie Martin Simons, newspaper editor
- Seymour Stedman, attorney and 1920 candidate for Vice President
- Carl D. Thompson, 1916 candidate for Congress
- John H. Walker, 1912 candidate for Congress
- John M. Work, 1914 candidate for Congress
