= Mary Marcy =

American socialist (1877–1922)

Mary E. Marcy
- Born: May 8, 1877; Belleville, Illinois
- Died: December 8, 1922 (aged 45); Illinois
- Occupation: Labor leader
- Spouse: Leslie A. Marcy

Mary Edna Tobias Marcy (May 8, 1877 – December 8, 1922) was an American socialist author, pamphleteer, poet, and magazine editor. She is best remembered for her muckraking series of magazine articles on the meat industry, "Letters of a Pork Packer's Stenographer," as author of a widely translated socialist propaganda pamphlet regarded as a classic of the genre, Shop Talks on Economics, and as an assistant editor of the International Socialist Review, one of the most influential American socialist magazines of the first two decades of the 20th century.

== Biography ==
=== Early years ===
Mary Edna Tobias was born May 8, 1877, in Belleville, Illinois. Orphaned in her childhood, Mary's two younger siblings were sent away to live with relatives while she worked to support herself while attending high school. As she grew somewhat older Mary found more stable employment as a telephone switchboard operator and took her sister and brother back into her household, in which she served as the provider.

Mary purchased a textbook on stenography and taught herself shorthand in her free time.

She took an active interest in politics from an early age and found out firsthand about the consequences sometimes bestowed on those holding minority views on such matters when she was fired from her job in 1896 for wearing a button supporting populist Democrat William Jennings Bryan. "It is interesting to note," remarked socialist Jack Carney in his eulogy of Marcy, "that her employers were engaged in the business of manufacturing American flags."

Mary Marcy's husband, socialist journalist Leslie Marcy, also worked on the staff of The International Socialist Review.

Prominent attorney and civil libertarian Clarence Darrow heard the story of Mary's dismissal and went out of his way to aid the young woman. He obtained a job for her working as an office secretary for William R. Harper, president of the University of Chicago — a position which included free college tuition at the university. Marcy took full advantage of this opportunity, studying psychology under John Dewey and taking advanced courses in literature and philosophy.

After three years at the university, Mary married socialist journalist Leslie A. Marcy and moved from Chicago to Kansas City, Missouri. There Mary was employed as the personal secretary of an official of a large meat packing company, a job which she held from 1902 to 1905. Her experiences in this capacity were the inspiration for her muckraking magazine series, "Letters of a Pork Packer's Stenographer," which exposed the dangerous working conditions and inadequate wages which prevailed throughout the packing industry. It was this work by Marcy which brought her to the attention of radicals across America. Marcy also came to the attention of government officials bent on the investigation of the Beef Trust in the country. Marcy testified against her employers before a Chicago grand jury, an action which cost her her job.

Thereafter, Marcy took a job with Associated Charities of Kansas City, where she learned firsthand about the situation faced by the poor. Another magazine serial appeared from this work experience, a series of articles later published in the International Socialist Review under the title "Out of the Dump." Marcy emerged again as a sharp critic of the tactics of her employer, emphasizing the need of the poor for concrete physical assistance rather than paternalistic lectures about morality and the winnowing of "worthy" from "unworthy" recipients of aid.

=== Move to Charles H. Kerr & Co. ===
Mary Marcy joined the Socialist Party of America (SPA) in 1903. She had an affair with Charles H. Kerr, publisher of the Chicago-based socialist monthly magazine International Socialist Review, starting in 1904 — an event which may have precipitated Kerr's divorce from his wife, May Walden Kerr, in that year.

Marcy lived for a year in Hot Springs, Arkansas, where she worked as a freelance writer, before returning to Chicago to work as an assistant editor to Kerr at his International Socialist Review. Marcy remained with Charles H. Kerr & Co. until the day of her death 14 years later, formally serving as secretary of the publishing company in addition to her editorial task.

Moving from its origins as a dry theoretical magazine edited by A.M. Simons in its earliest years, by the end of the first decade of the 20th Century Kerr and Marcy had made the Review into an illustrated slick-paper publication which provided an aggressive voice to the left wing of the socialist movement. A report issued in 1911 by Kerr & Co. noted a circulation of 17,000 subscribers with additional over-the-counter and bulk sales of another 32,000 copies per issue, making the publication one of the largest magazines of the American left. Editor Kerr received a salary of $1500 and Assistant Editor Marcy $1000 in that year, according to the report.

During 1910 and 1911, Marcy published a series of eight articles in International Socialist Review called "Beginners' Course in Socialism and the Economics of Karl Marx," which attempted a popularization of the main ideas of Marxism. These were later republished in a book entitled Shop Talks on Economics — a work which was published in several non-English languages and which ultimately sold more than two million copies.

According to historian Sally M. Miller, Marcy frequently made use of pseudonyms for her written work, especially after 1915. Among those names which Miller believes to have been used by Marcy were "Jack Morton," "James Morton," "Jack Phillips," "John Randolph," "Max Roemer," and "Edna Tobias" — the last of these being a pairing of her middle name and maiden surname.

In addition to her radical journalism for Kerr & Co., Marcy would also eventually write a novel, a play, two children's books, and various short stories and poems, including propaganda verses for a deck of socialist playing cards designed by Industrial Workers of the World activist Ralph Chaplin.

=== War years and after ===
Mary Marcy in the office of the International Socialist Review.

In the years prior to American intervention in World War I, Kerr and Marcy maintained a strong internationalist perspective, with Marcy in particular seeking out participation from left wing members of the Zimmerwald movement, such as S.J. Rutgers and Anton Pannekoek. The Review opined again and again against the arms buildup of the Woodrow Wilson administration, conducted under the slogan of "Preparedness."

With the American declaration of war against Germany on April 7, 1917, the anti-militarist International Socialist Review became subject to an intensifying series of repressive government actions, including United States Post Office Department surveillance, and denial from the mails. Cut off from its ability to reach its subscribers, the publication was terminated early in 1918, the same year in which Marcy joined the revolutionary union the Industrial Workers of the World (IWW).

An attempt was made by Kerr & Co. to launch a successor publication, edited by Marcy and entitled The Labor Scrapbook, in March 1918, but the publication failed to achieve critical mass and was quickly terminated.

Somewhat ironically, as Charles H. Kerr & Co. was being effectively eliminated as a publisher of periodicals, the level of government surveillance was increased rather than lessened. The Marcys' home was ransacked by the U.S. Department of Justice searching for evidence about war resisters. She mortgaged this house to provide bail bond money for the political prisoners of the IWW, first on behalf of acting Secretary-Treasurer A. S. Embree and later, after Embree was convicted and imprisoned, to secure the release of William D. "Big Bill" Haywood.

Unfortunately for Marcy, the physically ailing and long-persecuted Haywood made the decision to jump bond and escape to Soviet Russia, a decision which cost Marcy and her husband their home.

In the summer of 1919, when the Socialist Party was deeply divided along factional lines, Marcy produced a leaflet to be circulated among the delegates to the forthcoming 1919 Emergency National Convention of the Socialist Party called "A Revolutionary Party." Fearing factional disintegration of the 100,000-strong American Socialist movement, Marcy pleaded that the movement maintain "a solid front to the capitalist enemy." Marcy's argument went unheeded and the Socialist Party split asunder along factional lines, ending in the formation of two new communist organizations in addition to the regular SPA and beginning a catastrophic spiral of decline.

=== Death and legacy ===
Demoralized by the disintegration of the American left in the years after the conclusion of World War I and suffering depression exacerbated by the loss of her Bowmanville, Illinois, home, Mary Marcy died by suicide from poison on December 8, 1922. Her last words were recorded as follows: "I want rest. No funeral, no flowers, cremation."

Her book, Shop Talks on Economics, is regarded as a classic of socialist propaganda literature and was translated in its day into Japanese, Chinese, Ukrainian, Romanian, Finnish, French, Italian, and Greek.

In 1984, more than six decades after her death, the Charles H. Kerr Publishing Company of Chicago released a new book collecting Mary Marcy's anti-militarist journalism published during the years of World War I.

== Works ==
- A Satire on Civilization, and Other Fables. Chicago: Donohue Brothers, 1900.
- Out of the Dump. Drawings by Ralph Chaplin. Chicago: Charles H. Kerr & Co., 1909.
- Shop Talks on Economics. Chicago: Charles H. Kerr & Co., 1911.
- How the Farmer Can Get His. Chicago: Charles H. Kerr & Co., 1916.
- Stories of the Cave People. Chicago: Charles H. Kerr & Co., 1917. — Children's book.
- Breaking Up the Home. Chicago: Charles H. Kerr & Co., n.d. [1910s].
- Wages in Mexican Money. Chicago: Charles H. Kerr & Co., n.d. [1910s].
- Why Catholic Workers Should Be Socialists. Chicago: Charles H. Kerr & Co., n.d. [1910s].
- Women as Sex Vendor: or, Why Women are Conservative, Being a View of the Economic Status of Woman. With Roscoe B. Tobias. Chicago: Charles H. Kerr & Co., 1918.
- "The Coming Struggle," The Ohio Socialist [Cleveland], whole no. 49 (Jan. 1, 1919), pg. 2.
- Industrial Autocracy. Chicago: Charles H. Kerr & Co., 1919.
- "A Revolutionary Party." (leaflet) Chicago: Mary Marcy, n.d. [1919].
- The Right to Strike. Chicago: Charles H. Kerr & Co., n.d. [c. 1920].
- Open the Factories. Chicago: Charles H. Kerr & Co., n.d. [c. 1921].
- A Free Union: A One Act Comedy of "Free Love." Chicago: Charles H. Kerr & Co., 1921.
- Rhymes of the Early Jungle Folk. Woodcuts by Wharton H. Esherick. Chicago: Charles H. Kerr & Co., 1922. — Children's book.
- You Have No Country!: Workers' Struggle Against War. Franklin Rosemont, editor. Chicago: Charles H. Kerr Publishing Co., 1984.
