= Frank Bohn =

Frank Bohn may refer to:

- Frank Bohn (socialist) (1878–1975), National Secretary of the Socialist Labor Party of America
- Frank P. Bohn (1866–1944), Republican Congressman from Michigan
