= Charles H. Kerr =

American publisher, editor and writer (1860–1944)

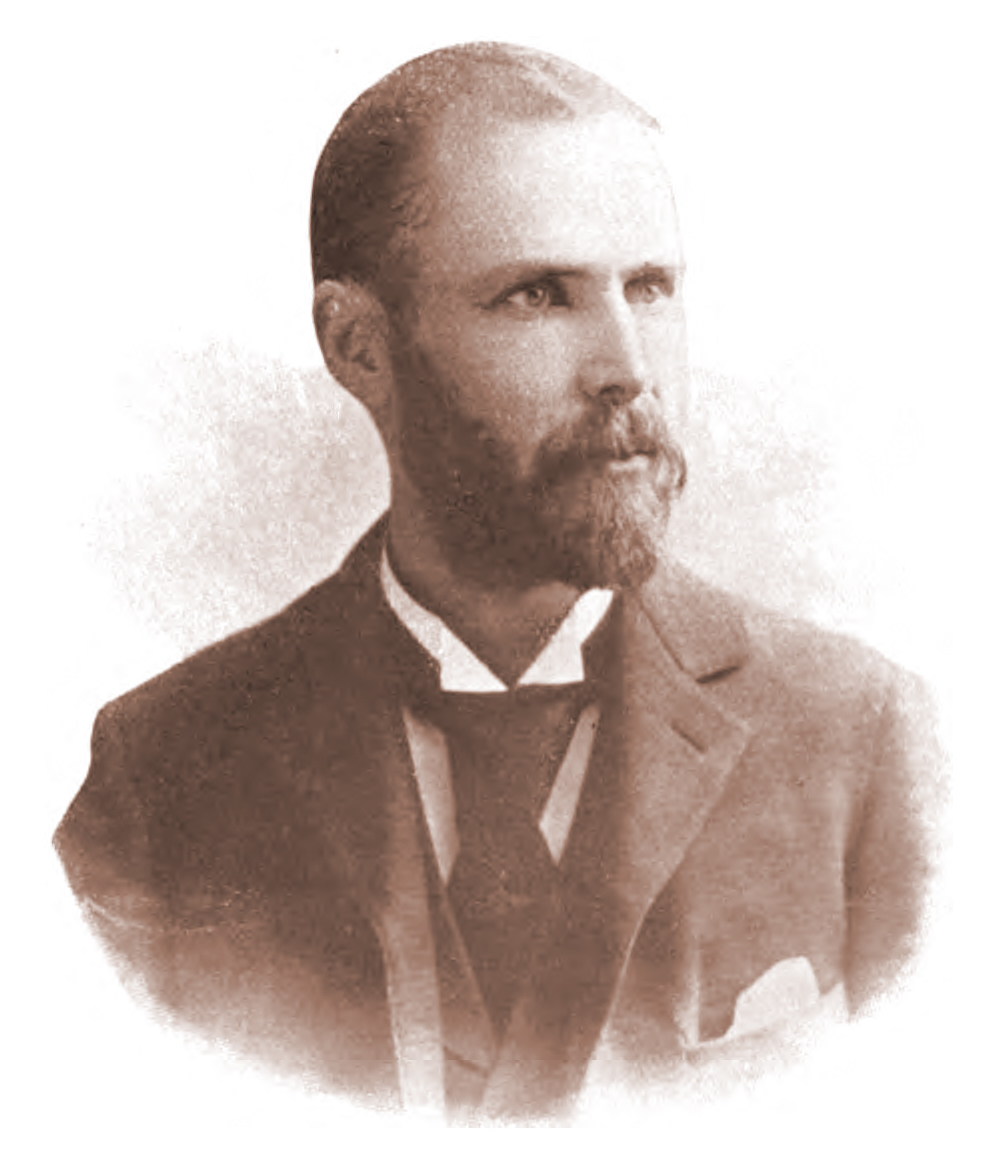
- Kerr c. 1895
- Born: Charles Hope Kerr; April 23, 1860; LaGrange, Georgia, U.S.
- Died: June 1, 1944 (aged 84); Los Angeles, U.S.
- Education: University of Wisconsin–Madison
- Occupations: Publisher, editor, writer
- Known for: Charles H. Kerr Publishing Company
- Spouse: May Walden (m. 1892; div. 1904)
- Children: 2

Charles Hope Kerr (April 23, 1860 – June 1, 1944) was an American publisher, editor, writer and translator. A son of abolitionists, he established the Charles H. Kerr Publishing Company in Chicago in 1886. Initially it printed Unitarian literature, but he soon moved the company in a radical direction toward socialism, Marxism, and support for the Industrial Workers of the World (IWW). He sold his controlling interest in the company in 1928.

== Biography ==
=== Early life and education ===
Charles Hope Kerr was born in LaGrange, Georgia, on April 23, 1860. He was the son of Katharine Brown—a teacher and daughter of a Congregationalist minister—and Alexander Kerr, a Scottish immigrant who taught mathematics and Latin at private academies in Georgia. Charles' parents were abolitionists; they were suspected of circulating antislavery tracts and conducting a clandestine school for slaves. When the Civil War broke out, the Kerr family escaped to safety in Rockford, Illinois via the Underground Railroad.

Charles spent his early childhood in Rockford. In 1871 his family moved to Madison, Wisconsin when Alexander was appointed chairman of the Classics Department at the University of Wisconsin–Madison. Charles graduated from that university in 1881, with a degree in Romance languages. He later settled in Chicago.

=== Career ===
Following graduation, Kerr landed a job on the staff of Unity magazine, a Chicago-based publication of the liberal Unitarian sect. In 1886—a year after he edited a book of religious poetry, Unity Songs Resung, for the Colegrove Book Company—he leveraged his magazine connections to form an independent publishing house, Charles H. Kerr & Company, whose initial mission was to handle the printing and distribution of Unity. In Kerr's recollection, for the first seven years of its existence, his publishing company advocated for "a religion that is rational and a rationalism that is religious", rather than advocating for social or political change.

In the 1890s, Kerr's politics shifted left, which was reflected in his publishing choices. Among the factors cited for his radicalization were his sympathy for the U.S. agrarian populist movement embodied in the People's Party, his fascination with Edward Bellamy's 1888 utopian socialist novel Looking Backward, his 1892 marriage to the radical feminist May Walden, and his revulsion at the harsh repression of the 1894 Pullman Strike, as Allen Ruff notes:

In the aftermath of the strike, Eugene Debs moved leftward, well on his way to becoming the most famous and revered voice of a homegrown socialism. Countless others, alienated further by the role of the courts, the police, the military, and the seeming usurpation of republican values and liberties, also became more receptive to radical critiques. Charles Kerr clearly was one of the latter.

In 1893, Kerr broke with Unity and began publishing a political periodical, New Occasions (later renamed New Time), which called itself "a magazine of social and industrial progress." In January 1900, Kerr hired Algie Martin Simons to launch a more explicitly socialist magazine, the International Socialist Review (ISR). In 1908, after growing dissatisfied with the magazine's direction, Kerr fired Simons and took over primary editorial responsibility for ISR, which until its demise in 1918 would remain loyal to the Socialist Party of America.

Kerr utilized his college training in Romance languages to translate into English such works as Paul Lafargue's The Right to Be Lazy, and Antonio Labriola's Essays on the Materialist Conception of History. But Kerr's most famous effort was his translation from the French of the radical working-class anthem, "The Internationale". His version became the standard English translation sung in the U.S. and was widely circulated in the many editions of the IWW's Little Red Songbook.

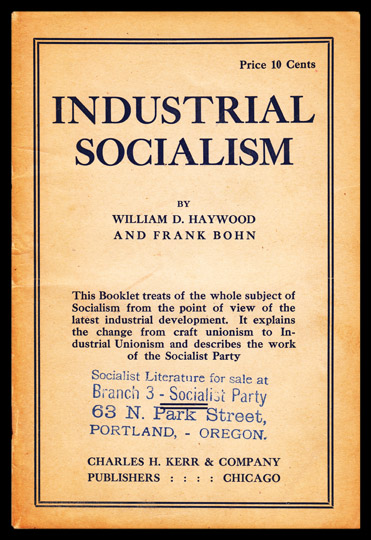
Industrial Socialism by Frank Bohn and Bill Haywood, published by Charles Kerr in 1911

In the early 1900s, Kerr's company grew into a leading publisher of socialist, communist, anarchist, and IWW works. It published an inexpensive Pocket Library of Socialism, "which by 1902 had put into circulation thirty-five titles totaling a half-million copies". Kerr sought to build his business on a cooperative model. As he explained in a 1903 pamphlet titled "Cooperation in Publishing Socialist Literature", he hoped that by selling thousands of small shares in Charles H. Kerr & Co., it "would be enough to add some important book to our list of publications, and it is the general desire of all stockholders so far as heard from that the profits be used to increase the work that the company is doing. The personal advantage to stockholders is not in any possible dividends; it is in the privilege of buying Socialist books at the reduced prices".

In his autobiography, the IWW artist and writer Ralph Chaplin recalled being a teenager back in 1905 when he was introduced to Kerr in the Chicago publishing office:

He was very friendly, a quiet, studious gentleman with sensitive features, small Vandyke beard, and the forehead of a philosopher. His father was then professor emeritus of Greek literature at the University of Wisconsin. Charles Kerr took an interest in me from the start. He guided me in my studies of socialism, science, and history. He also gave me my first coaching in public speaking. John P. Altgeld's Art of Oratory was used as a textbook. I became a stockholder in the Co-operative Publishing Company by purchasing a ten-dollar share.

In addition to book publishing and magazine editing, Kerr was active in partisan politics. He served on the National Campaign Committee of the Social Democratic Party of America and later the Socialist Party of America. He was also on the executive committee of the Socialist Party of Chicago, including a brief stint as its treasurer. In 1902 he was secretary of the Socialist Party of Illinois.

Kerr faced difficult times during and immediately after World War I. Socialists had agitated against U.S. entry into the war, which was considered seditious talk. It prompted "the postmaster general to refuse to send the International Socialist Review through the mails in adherence to the Espionage Act, which forbade any materials inciting 'treason, insurrection, or forcible resistance to any law of the United States.'" As a result, the magazine's circulation plummeted and it ceased publication in 1918. The government's wartime raids on the IWW financially affected Kerr's company since it was the main source of legal funds to defend Ralph Chaplin, Bill Haywood and other IWW members. The strain of those years was particularly acute for Kerr's longtime aide and ISR assistant editor Mary Marcy; she was a target of government surveillance and ended up committing suicide in 1922.

According to Dave Roediger and Franklin Rosemont, the decades of "[government] repression, splits in the Socialist Party and the decimation of the IWW all took their toll and, by 1928, an exhausted Charles H. Kerr retired from the company he had directed for 42 years." He sold his controlling shares to John Keracher and the American Proletarian Party.

=== Personal life ===
In 1892, Kerr married May Walden, who was said to have been a radical influence on his thinking. She was a socialist-feminist, a temperance activist, and the author of Socialism and the Home (1901). The couple had two daughters (the first died at age four) before divorcing in 1904.

=== Vegetarianism ===
Kerr was a vegetarian and his company published J. Howard Moore's The Universal Kinship.

=== Death ===
Kerr spent his last years in Los Angeles. He died there on June 1, 1944. He was 84.

== Works ==
Articles:

- "What Socialists Think" (July 1905)
- "What Socialism Is" (October 1917)

Compilations:

- Unity Songs Resung (1885)

Translations:

- Essays on the Materialist Conception of History (1904)
- Social and Philosophical Studies (1906)
- The Right to Be Lazy, and Other Studies (1907)
