= Frank Bohn (socialist) =

American advocate of industrial unionism (1878–1975)

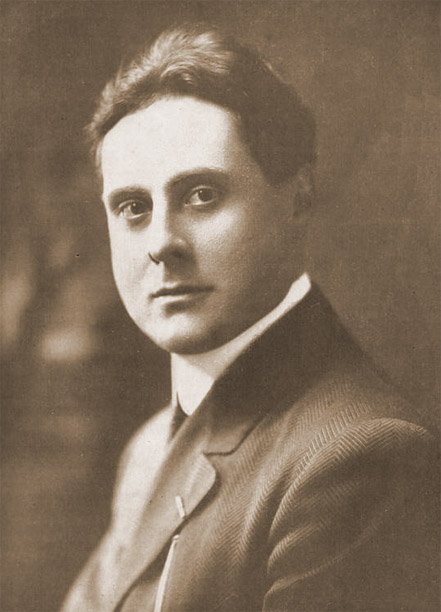
Frank Bohn in 1911, from a promotional brochure published by the Socialist Party of America.

Frank Bohn (September 26, 1878 – July 29, 1975) was an advocate of industrial unionism and a founding member of the Industrial Workers of the World. From 1906 to 1908 he was the National Secretary of the Socialist Labor Party of America, before leaving to join forces with the rival Socialist Party of America. After World War I his politics became increasingly nationalistic and he left the labor movement altogether.

== Biography ==
=== Early life ===
Frank Bohn was born September 26, 1878, on an Ohio farm. He was the youngest son of Johann Heinrich Carl Bohn from Remptendorf, Thuringia. The elder Bohn had actively supported the German revolutions of 1848–1849 in the principalities of Reuss Younger Line and Elder Line. In 1852, following the failure of the revolution, he emigrated together with the family of his sister to the U.S.. Frank's two oldest brothers, Charles and Christopher, served as Union soldiers during the American Civil War.

Frank became a soldier and non-commissioned officer in the 5th Ohio Volunteer Infantry in the Spanish–American War. He later claimed that the graft, corruption, and mismanagement he witnessed in the military was a key experience that pushed him in a radical direction. After the war, he attended Baldwin-Wallace College, where he obtained an undergraduate degree. Like his brother William, Frank went to graduate school at the University of Michigan, earning a Ph.D. in Economics in 1904.

=== Socialist activism ===
In 1904, Bohn was a national organizer for the Socialist Labor Party of America and the party's industrial union offshoot, the Socialist Trade & Labor Alliance. It was in this capacity that he sat as one of 22 invited radical political and labor leaders attending a "secret conference" in Chicago on January 2, 1905, to discuss the prospective formation of a new general industrial union—the Industrial Workers of the World. This three-day conclave thrashed out their disagreements and put forth a set of 11 principles and an Industrial Union Manifesto. It issued a call for a convention to be held in Chicago on June 27, 1905, to launch the new general industrial organization.

After formation of the IWW, Bohn worked for a time as an organizer for that organization, touring the United States and Canada speaking on their behalf.

From 1906 to 1908, he served as National Secretary of the Socialist Labor Party. In this role, he was named a delegate to the 1907 Stuttgart Congress of the Second International. Bohn broke with the SLP decisively in June 1908, however, publishing an article in the non-party press lamenting the lack of unity of the American socialist movement caused by the position of his former party. Bohn saw the Socialist Labor Party as a failure, despite what he considered its basically-correct political orientation since 1900, because of the party's studied self-isolation and harsh treatment of newcomers:

It failed, first, because it attempted to sever the veteran revolutionary element from the forces which were developing to that position. Nor is this all. It strove to draw about itself the veil of absolute sanctity. It was supposed by certain of its leaders to have attained what the Salvation Army calls 'Holiness'; therefore it durst not hold conversation with the unclean; therefore it refused to so far trust the working class' mind as to risk its fundamentally correct principles in the rough and tumble of a united movement. The scientific truths at the bottom of the revolutionary upsweep were made over into the mumbled litany of a sectarian clique. And thus Truth lost its beauty and saving power. "The SLP failed, second, because of its wrong methods of propaganda and organization. Men and women who will develop into revolutionists worthwhile to the movement are sure to demand respect and decent treatment from their teachers while they are learning."

Upon departing the SLP, Bohn enlisted himself in the ranks of the rival Socialist Party of America, a group which he acknowledged "is not what we might desire." Nevertheless:

It would have been all that the clearest and most ardent revolutionist might have hoped for, had the whole revolutionary element united to form it in 1901 and learned to use decent and educational methods in propagating their correct principles. A developing class-conscious proletariat will yet make it what it ought to be—the political organization of a class which is as firmly united industrially as political.

During the 1909/10 academic year, Bohn was a lecturer in history, economics, and politics at Columbia University and the Brooklyn Institute of Arts and Sciences. The content of his lectures proved too radical for the Columbia administration, however, and he was not returned to the university.

After leaving Columbia, Bohn went to work as State Organizer for the Socialist Party of New York. He was also named as an assistant editor on the International Socialist Review, published in Chicago by Charles H. Kerr & Co.

=== Turn from the IWW ===
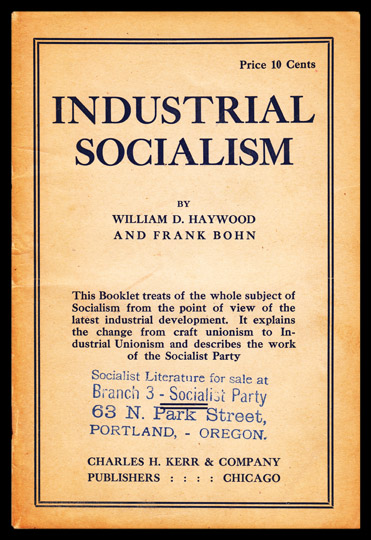
Frank Bohn is best remembered as co-author with "Big Bill" Haywood of a frequently reissued pamphlet first published in 1911.

The IWW atrophied to the point where it was unable to even hold a national convention in 1909, and its 1910 gathering in Chicago transacted no business of real importance. Turnover was enormous in the organization. Vincent St. John noted in a letter to Paul Brissenden that the organization had issued 60,000 dues books in the previous 18-month period, but only about one in ten, or roughly 6,000 of these, remained members in good standing. In this October 1911 letter St. John claimed a total membership for the organization of 10,000 individuals in good standing.

This stalling of the IWW's growth led Bohn and others to the perspective that the organization suffered from a serious or even fatal sickness. In the July 1911 issue of Charles H. Kerr's International Socialist Review, Bohn wrote an article entitled "Is the IWW to Grow?" He placed the blame for the stagnation squarely upon the anti-political faction which had won control of the organization. He accused the IWW's mixed locals and propaganda locals of having driven away "real" industrial unionists from the organization, leaving those he disparagingly characterized as "hot-air social revolutionaries." He felt that the anti-political "fanatics" threatened the survival of the IWW:

The people we mean are those who make of anti-politics a fetish. They see in the Socialist Party a number who are opposed to the IWW. 'Therefore,' say these fanatics, 'as some of the Socialist Party members are against us, that is sure proof that all of them are against us. The greatest enemy of the working class are these advocates of unsound doctrine—of political action. Let us destroy them. That will emancipate the working class.'

The experience of the five years just past has proven conclusively that the best way for the members of the Socialist Party to develop anti-politics in the IWW is to attack it. Likewise, the desertion of the party by IWW members, and their opposition to it, has greatly strengthened the position of the reformist and compromising wing of the party. Each of these groups has helped nurse the other along. * * *

The fanatic is a person who sees or think he sees but one thing. Whether the thing he sees is there or not is of secondary importance. The anti-politics fanatics in the IWW see the Socialist Party and nothing else. What they think they see in the Socialist Party is usually expressed in a vocabulary of vituperation. ... In hating the Socialist Party they forget why they hate it. They forget industrial unionism. They forget the class struggle. * * *

The anti-politics agitation is not a movement. It cannot develop an organization of its own. It is not industrial unionism. It cannot be revolutionary because it is not positive. It is purely negative and it ends in nothing.

Is this chair-warming sect now the leading element in the IWW? Is it in a majority? If it is, the IWW is not dying. It is dead.

=== Later years ===
U.S. entry into World War I against Germany and the Austro-Hungarian empire was a decisive turning-point for Bohn. In the fall of 1916, Bohn aided the Preparedness Movement by contributing articles to The New York Times in which he condemned German militarism as a menace to world peace.

The staunch, unflinching anti-militarist line of the Socialist Party of America established at the party's 1917 St. Louis Convention put the organization at odds with Bohn's views. After keeping his criticism within party ranks for half a year, he decided in the fall of 1917 to break decisively with the SPA. He wrote an open letter to the Secretary of Local Bronx, where his own chapter was located. Bohn's letter, published in The New York Times on September 26, 1917, declared:

The position of the Socialist Party of New York, as voiced in the present [electoral] campaign, makes it a plain matter of duty on my part to resign my membership at once. The party is opposed to the conduct of war. I am whole-heartedly supporting the cause of the Allies against Germany. It was my hope that the party might not make the war a primary issue here or throughout the nation; in that case I might have honorably retained my membership. But the campaign here is to be waged directly and solely upon the issue of the war. ... The social ideals I have had the privilege of advancing among you are now more precious to me than ever before. But I am positive in my belief that even a partial victory of German militarism would institute militarism and the servile state throughout the world and thus make an end of political democracy and of the great hope he have of industrial democracy in our generation.

Following his departure from the Socialist Party, Bohn contributed to America's World War I effort by writing a propaganda pamphlet for the American Alliance for Labor and Democracy, an initiative of the Wilson administration to mobilize American labor in support of the European war. Thereafter, Bohn went to work for the Committee on Public Information in France and Switzerland, assisting in the production of pro-war propaganda targeted at the labor movement.

He joined the National Non-Partisan League and was a delegate to the 1st National Convention of the Labor Party of the United States in November 1919.

Bohn apparently worked as a journalist during the inter-war years. He also headed an organization called the German–American Congress for Democracy during the early years of World War II.

In his book Surrender on Demand (1945), Varian Fry described how Bohn began working with him in Marseille in 1940 as they helped German refugees escape to America. The Tamiment Library - Robert F. Wagner Archives New York documents Frank Bohn's activities in Marseille 1940/1941.

In 1941, Bohn wrote a report for the newly established Foreign Nationalities Branch of the State Department entitled "The German-American Population in the United States." In the report, he warned against equating the 19th-century German immigrants, who were rapidly Americanized, with 20th-century newcomers, who were influenced by German nationalist propaganda and represented a potential pool of Nazi support on American soil.

=== Death and legacy ===
Bohn died July 29, 1975, at the age of 96.

He is best remembered today as co-author with Bill Haywood of the influential pamphlet Industrial Socialism, a short work that helped fuel the American syndicalist boom of 1912–14.

== Works ==
- Industrial Socialism. Co-written with Bill Haywood. Chicago: Charles H. Kerr & Co., 1911.
- "Socialism in the Middle West". The New York Call. Vol. 4, no. 143. May 23, 1911.
- The Catholic Church and Socialism.. Co-written with Father Thomas McGrady. Chicago: Charles H. Kerr & Co., n.d. [c. 1912].
- No Compromise with Germany. New York: American Alliance for Labor and Democracy, n.d. [c. 1917].
- "The Ku Klux Klan Interpreted," American Journal of Sociology, vol. 30, no. 4 (Jan. 1925), pp. 385–407. In JSTOR
- Boulder Dam: From the Origin of the Idea to the Swing-Johnson Bill. New York: Joint Committee of National Utility Associations, 1927.
- The Great Change: Work and Wealth in the New Age. New York, T. Nelson and Sons, 1935.
- Allen Ruff, "We Called Each Other Comrade" – Charles H. Kerr & Company, Radical Publishers. Oakland, CA: PM Press, 2011 (Second Edition) 141–143.
