= The Right to Be Lazy =

1883 book by Paul Lafargue

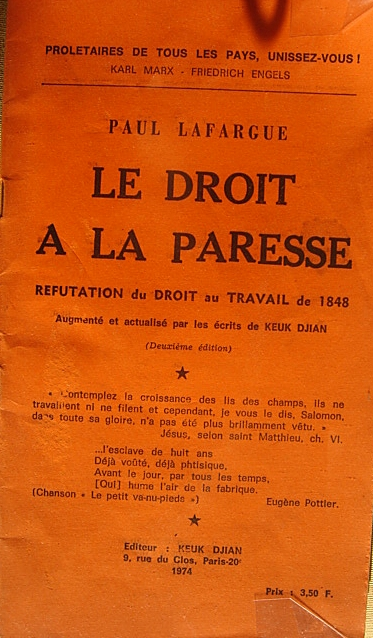
- Author: Paul Lafargue
- Translator: Charles H. Kerr
- Language: French
- Publication date: 1883
- Publication place: France

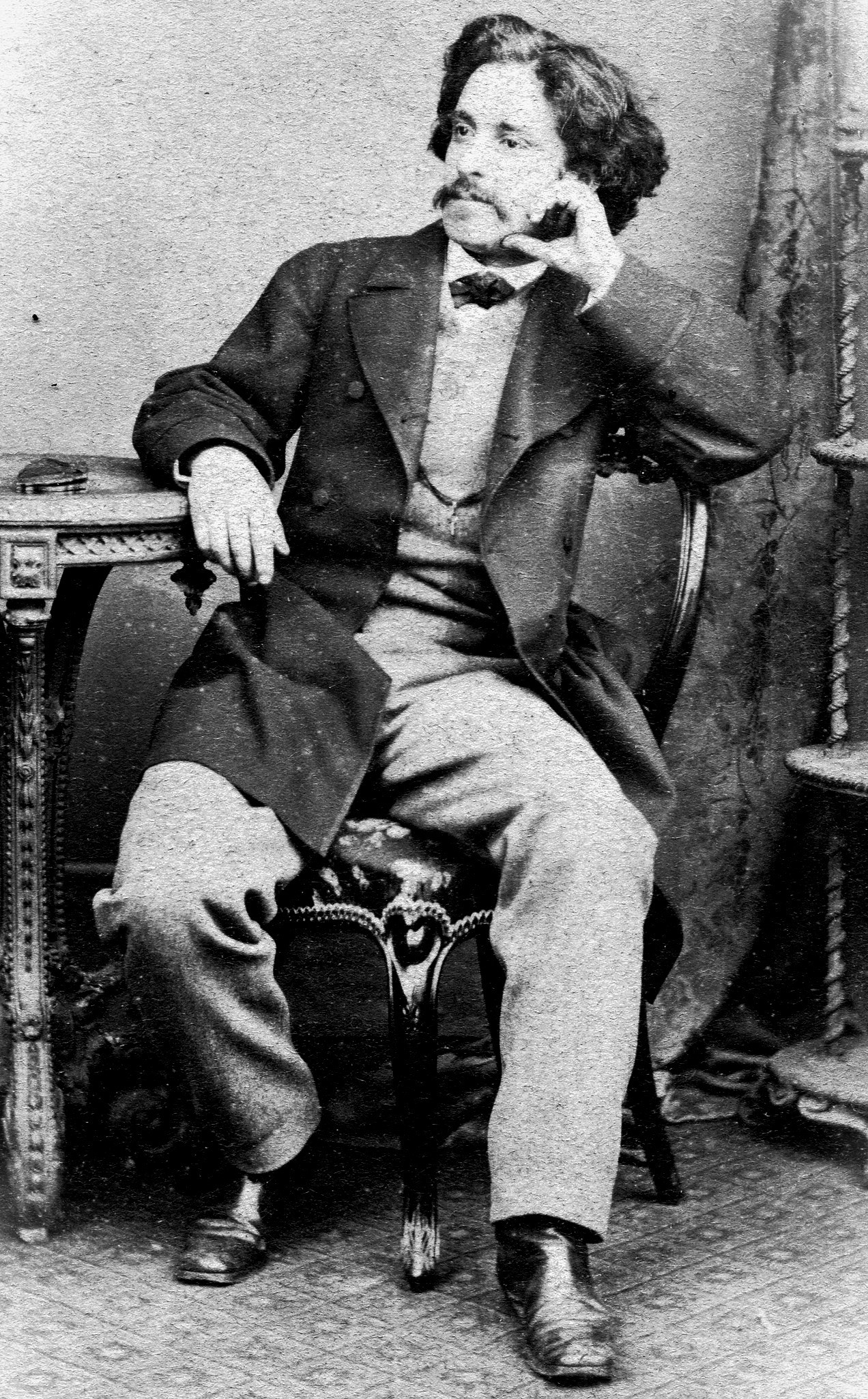
Lafargue proclaimed the right to be lazy.

The Right to Be Lazy (French: Le Droit à la paresse) is a book by Paul Lafargue, published in 1883. In it, Lafargue, a French socialist, opposes the labour movement's fight to expand wage labour rather than abolish or at least limit it. According to Lafargue, wage labour is tantamount to slavery, and to fight as a labour movement for the extension of slavery is preposterous. In the book, Lafargue proposes the right to be lazy, in contrast to the right to work, which he deems bourgeois.

== Introduction ==
After an initial quote from Gotthold Ephraim Lessing ("Let us be lazy in everything, except in loving and drinking, except in being lazy"), the book's introduction reads: "A strange delusion possesses the working classes of the nations where capitalist civilization holds its sway. This delusion drags in its train the individual and social woes which for two centuries have tortured sad humanity. This delusion is the love of work, the furious passion for work, pushed even to the exhaustion of the vital force of the individual and his progeny. Instead of opposing this mental aberration, the priests, the economists and the moralists have cast a sacred halo over work."

== Content ==
According to Lafargue, it is sheer madness that people are fighting for the right to an eight-hour working day. In other words, eight hours of servitude, exploitation and suffering, when it is leisure, joy, and self-realisation that should be fought for, and as few hours of slavery as possible. Automation, which had already come a long way in Lafargue's time, could easily reduce working hours to three or four hours a day. This would leave a large part of the day for the things we really want to do, such as to spend time with friends, relax, enjoy life, and be lazy. Lafargue argues the machine is the saviour of humanity only if the working time it frees up becomes leisure time. The time that is freed up is usually converted into more hours of work, which he compares to more hours of toil and drudgery. Working too many hours a day is often degrading, while working very few hours can be very refreshing and enriching, leading to general advancement, health, joy, and satisfaction. He is also polemical against human rights; instead, he prefers the right to be lazy.
