= May Wood Simons =

American writer, teacher, and socialist (1876-1948)

- May Wood Simons (1876-1948) from a Socialist Party postcard, circa 1914.
- Born: 10 May 1876; Baraboo, Wisconsin, USA
- Died: 3 December 1948 (aged 72); New Martinsville, West Virginia, USA
- Education: Baraboo, Wisconsin High School (1891); Northwestern University (1893-1895); University of Chicago (1905); PH.B. in Economics NU, Ph.D. in Economics, 1930
- Occupations: Socialist; writer; editor; teacher
- Works: The Workers Call; Chicago Daily Socialist; International Socialist Review; "The Party Builder"; "Everyday Problems in Economics" (1945)
- Spouse: Algie Martin Simons (m. 1897)
- Children: Miriam Eleanor (1900), Laurence (1898-1899)

May Wood Simons (May 10, 1876 – December 3, 1948) was an American socialist writer, editor, teacher and economist. She developed nationally acclaimed programs for the assimilation of immigrants and the political education of women, and published several notable works, including "Women and the Social Problem" and "Outline of Civics". She and her husband were members of the Socialist Labor Party and she became a significant figure in the socialist movement as a lecturer and assistant editor of the Chicago Party Socialist (1907-1910). Simons was the translator of several books by German-speaking European Marxists, including Wilhelm Liebknecht and Karl Kautsky. Simons married fellow socialist Algie Martin Simons in 1897.

== Socialist, Women's Rights Advocate, Economist ==
"In 1909, the first National Woman’s Day was held throughout the United States on the last Sunday of February, the 28th. It was organized by the Socialist Party of the United States’ newly formed Woman’s National Committee to celebrate the political rights of women. [Simons] was a delegate to, and later head of, the committee and spoke in favor of the Socialist party supporting women’s suffrage. Simons and her husband, Algie, wrote for and edited several socialist publications, including the Worker’s Call, the Chicago Daily Socialist, International Socialist Review, Coming Nation, and The Party Builder. Simons resigned from the Woman’s National Committee in 1914 because of the lack of care for women’s issues by the Socialist party. Afterwards, Simons devoted herself to the cause of Americanization of immigrants during the First World War, eventually becoming the chair of the Americanization Committee of the Milwaukee County Council of Defense. She also continued to work for women’s issues, including joining the League of Women Voters and eventually gaining a position of leadership. Simons also went on to pursue a PhD in economics from Northwestern University, which she received in 1930, and also became a part-time instructor there. She published an economics textbook in 1945 entitled Everyday Problems in Economics."

=== Inspirer of International Women's Day ===
Having played a key role in the founding of an annual Women's Day celebration in the USA in 1909, in 1910, Simons was an "American delegate to the International Socialist Congress at Copenhagen, where Clara Zetkin was inspired to create a similar celebration in Germany and Austria, founding International Women’s Day the next year, in 1911." As part of this Congress, the Second International Congress of Socialist Women was held on August 26, 1910, at which it was declared that "[t]he Socialist women's movement of all countries repudiates the limited Women's Suffrage as a falsification of and an insult to the principle of the political equality of the female sex." German delegates Zetkin, Käte Duncker "and other comrades" submitted the following resolution to the Congress: "On occasion of the annual May demonstration [...] the request of full political equality of the sexes must be proclaimed and substantiated. In agreement with the class-conscious political and trade organizations in their country the socialist women of all nationalities have to organize a special Women's Day, which in first line has to promote Women Suffrage propaganda."

May Wood Simons' papers are held by the Wisconsin Historical Society.

== Works ==
=== Writings ===
- Woman and the Social Problem. Chicago: Charles H. Kerr & Co., 1899.
- "Education and Socialism," International Socialist Review, Vol 1, No. 10,(April 1, 1901).
- "Art and Socialism," International Socialist Review, Vol. 2, No. 10 (April 1902), pp. 710–714.
- Socialism and the Organized Labor Movement. Chicago: Charles H. Kerr & Co., n.d. [1903].
- "Ground in the Mill," The Evolutionist, vol. 1, no. 3 (Sept. 1909), pp. 98–102.
- Everyday Problems in Economics. Chicago: American Technical Society, 1945.

=== Translations ===
- Wilhelm Liebknecht, Socialism: What It Is and What It Seeks to Accomplish. (Translator.) 1897.
- Karl Kautsky, Frederick Engels: His Life, His Work and His Writings. (Translator.) Chicago: Charles H. Kerr & Co., 1899.
- Karl Kautsky, The Social Revolution. (Translator.) Chicago: Charles H. Kerr & Co., 1916.
