= Charles H. Kerr Publishing Company =

American socialist publishing house since 1886

- Predecessor: Charles H. Kerr & Co.
- Founded: 1886; 140 years ago
- Founder: Charles H. Kerr
- Country of origin: United States
- Headquarters location: Chicago
- Distribution: AK Press, PM Press (special editions)
- Publication types: Books, pamphlets, radical memorabilia
- Nonfiction topics: Radical politics
- Official website: charleshkerr.com

The Charles H. Kerr Publishing Company is an American publishing house founded in Chicago, Illinois in 1886 by Charles Hope Kerr. Originally called Charles H. Kerr & Co., its stated purpose was to distribute Unitarian tracts. But as Kerr's political views were radicalized in the 1890s, the company's choice of publications shifted from religion to populism, Marxism, socialism, and the militant labor movement as embodied in the Industrial Workers of the World (IWW).

In 1928, Kerr ceded control of the firm to the Proletarian Party of America, which continued the imprint for the next several decades until control was transferred in 1971 to a circle of Chicago-based radicals who gave the company its current moniker and its motto, "Subversive Literature for the Whole Family Since 1886". In the 21st century, the Charles H. Kerr Publishing Company remains in operation, making it "the oldest socialist publishing house in the world."

== History ==
=== Unitarian origins ===
Inside page of the 10th Anniversary issue of Unity magazine, edited by Jenkin Lloyd Jones and published by Charles H. Kerr & Co.

In March 1878 a magazine called Unity had been launched by liberal supporters of the Western Unitarian Conference. The wing of the Unitarian movement represented by the new semi-monthly magazine argued that personal character rather than literal belief in a body of written dogma marked the true "test and essence of religion." These so-called "Unity Men" sought wider acceptance among Unitarians for this fundamental idea of the primacy of ethics over belief — a matter of no little controversy among the more conservative church mainstream of the day. A monthly magazine called Unitarian was established in January 1886 in an attempt to combat the ideas of the "Unity men" — who were seen as undermining Christianity in favor of what was characterized as a new "Ethical Culture."

As the controversy between the dissident "ethical" Unitarians and the more conservative "doctrinal" church mainstream heated up, the former felt the need for centralized and expeditious publication of books and other materials reflecting their views. The Georgia-born Charles Hope Kerr, who joined the Unity magazine staff in the early 1880s, obliged by establishing in Chicago in 1886 a publishing house for the "Unity men". He called it "Charles H. Kerr & Co." The Unity men aspired to promote a sound relationship between the emerging evolutionary science of the day and enlightened religious belief — or, as Kerr himself put it, "a religion that is rational and a rationalism that is religious."

The primary mission of Kerr's new company was to publish Unity magazine, although a literary journal called The University was also briefly issued before being subsumed. Besides books and magazines, the early Kerr & Co. produced pamphlets and hymnals for use by a network of "Unity Clubs" around the country. Topics explored in those publications included history, comparative religion, advanced biblical criticism, and evolutionary science. In addition to the Unitarian material, Kerr also issued a number of volumes of poetry and literature. The company maintained this orientation for approximately seven years before making a turn to more temporal themes of economics, politics, and sociology.

=== Populist period ===
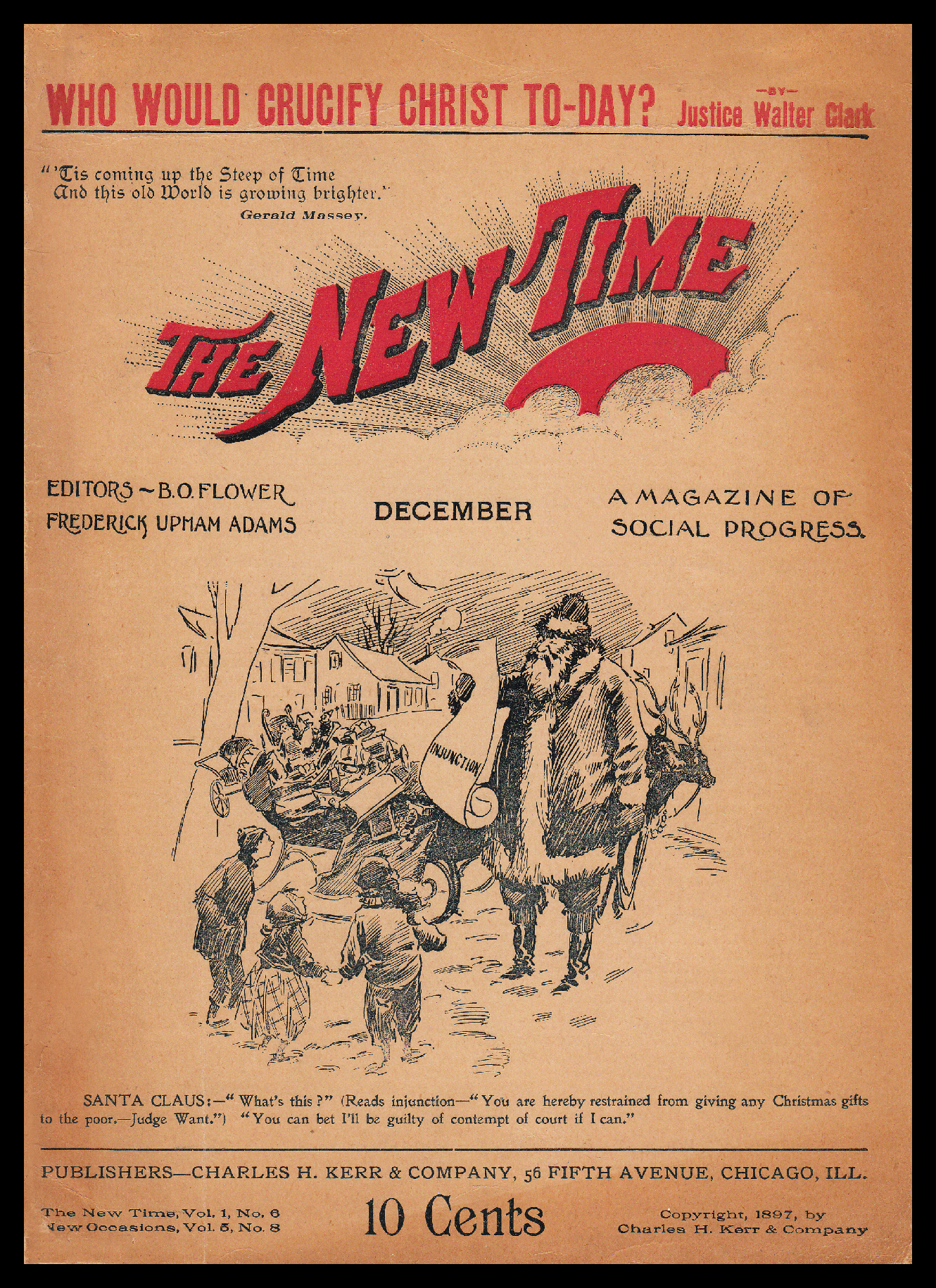
The New Time (formerly New Occasions) was published by Charles H. Kerr & Co. from 1893–1899 and included both social fiction and articles on populist political and economic themes.

Charles H. Kerr & Co. was incorporated in 1893, with 1,000 shares of stock authorized with a par value of $10 per share, representing a market capitalization of $10,000. That same year marked a change in the firm's direction away from religious themes and towards hard politics. The company ended its connection to Unity and instead published a new monthly magazine, initially titled New Occasions but then renamed to The New Time in July 1897. This "semi-socialist" publication attained a circulation of over 30,000 before being spun off as an independent commercial entity under the direction of editor Frederick Upham Adams. Adams ran into financial difficulties shortly after taking over the magazine, and the publication was terminated and its subscription list sold to The Arena, a monthly edited by B. O. Flower.

In the 1890s, Kerr & Co. was influenced by the growth of the People's Party, and put out titles on populist themes such as monetary reform, railroad regulation, and government control of the banking industry. Although some of these titles skirted the edges of socialism, it was not until spring of 1899 that the company made a decisive turn toward the international socialism espoused by Karl Marx. A close association was established between Kerr & Co. and a new Chicago socialist weekly newspaper edited by A. M. Simons, The Workers Call.

=== Socialist publisher ===
In January 1900, Simons was hired by Kerr & Co. as vice president with a view to starting a new magazine. It was to be the International Socialist Review (ISR), one of the foremost American socialist periodicals in the first two decades of the 20th century. ISR launched with approximately 800 subscribers and by the end of 1900 had more than quadrupled this total. With additional issues sold in bulk, an increased press run of 10,000 copies was predicted by Kerr early in 1901.

The firm dedicated to publishing revolutionary socialist literature was funded by the sale of stock, with about $500 worth taken by Kerr and a handful of wealthy benefactors, and a somewhat larger portion of operating funds generated through sales of individual shares at $10 each. Stockholders were not paid dividends or offered a promise of increased valuation, but rather were allowed to purchase Kerr publications at a deep discount off cover price. The company's pocket-sized "Pocket Library of Socialism" series of 5 cent pamphlets — each covered in distinctive red cellophane — were priced as cheaply as $6 per 1,000 copies when purchased by stockholders; Kerr's small cloth-bound "Standard Socialist Series" of works by Karl Marx, Frederick Engels, Karl Kautsky, and other leading Marxist theoreticians sold at a 50 percent discount, plus freight.

While not a lucrative business model, the lure of cheap socialist literature made the purchase of Kerr & Co. stock attractive to locals of the Social Democratic Party of America and its successor, the Socialist Party of America (SPA). A close relationship arose between the company and the socialist movement in America, with Kerr handling the bulk of publishing book-length manuscripts and a sizable number of pamphlets, while the SPA limited its publishing efforts to propaganda leaflets and a smaller set of pamphlets, particularly during the Party's earliest years.

Using his background in Romance languages, Kerr translated several works for publication by Kerr & Co. His translation from the French of the radical workers' anthem, "The Internationale", was widely circulated in the IWW's Little Red Songbook and became the standard English words sung in the U.S. (although a different, anonymous English translation is sung in Britain and Ireland). In 1906, Kerr & Co. published Volume I of Karl Marx's Das Kapital. The company followed this with the publication of Volumes II and III, making use of original translations done by ISR editorial staff member Ernest Untermann, and thus published the first complete English edition of Das Kapital. Moreover, Kerr published in 1908 the first English edition of Friedrich Nietzsche's Human All Too Human, translated by Alexander Harvey, a Belgian-born American journalist.

=== Increased radicalization ===
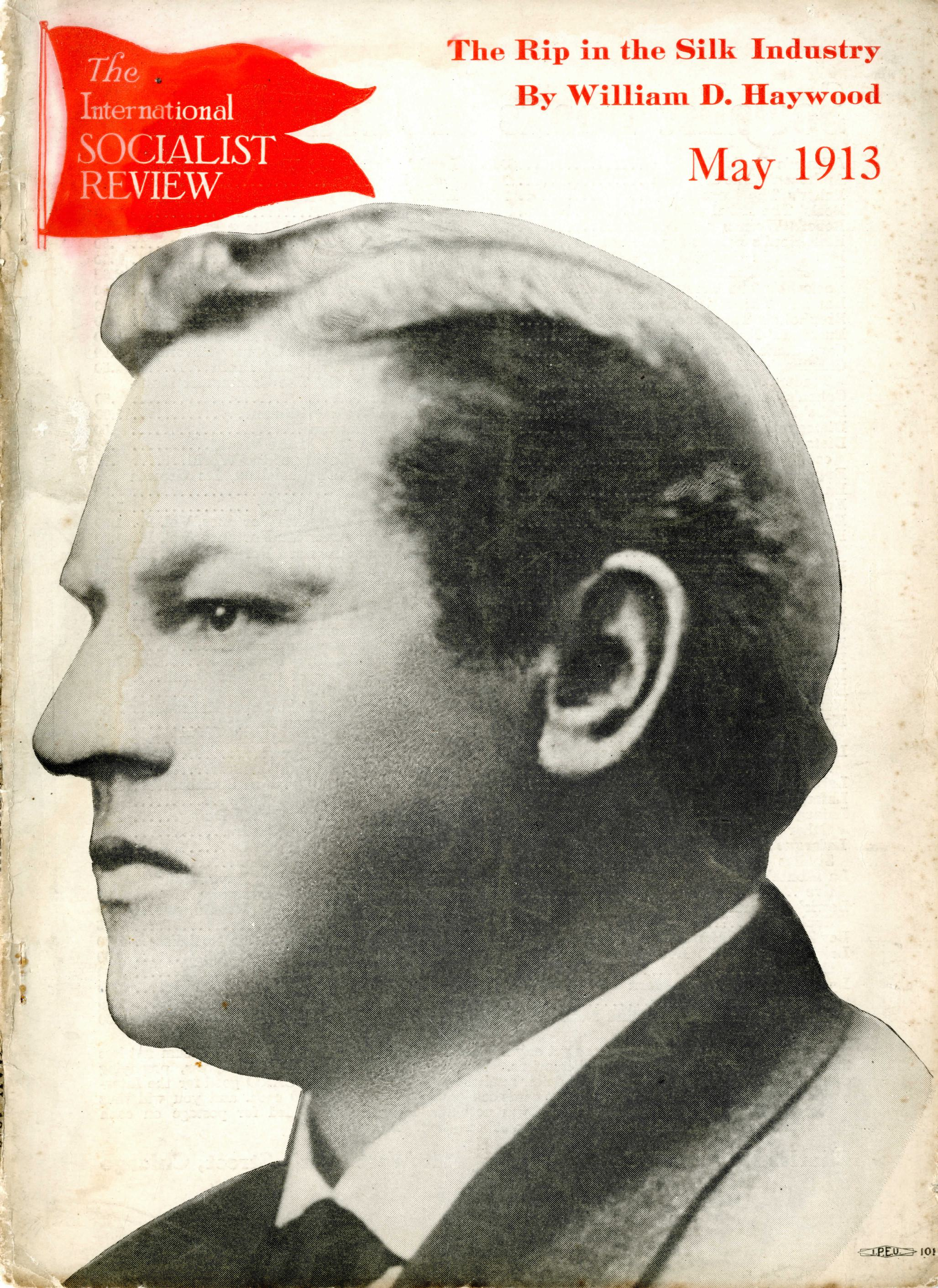
The monthly magazine International Socialist Review was the flagship of Charles H. Kerr & Co. from its launch in 1900 until its demise in 1918.

By 1907, Charles Kerr was dissatisfied with what he regarded as the scholastic and overly theoretical direction of International Socialist Review (ISR). He dismissed editor Simons at the start of 1908 and took over the editorial role himself, with assistance from Mary Marcy. Reflecting Kerr's increasingly radical politics, the magazine's political line moved further left, with emphasis given to strikes and the militant labor activities of the Industrial Workers of the World (IWW). The "look" of ISR changed as well; it incorporated "numerous stylistic and formatting techniques common to mass-circulation magazines"; by 1911 it contained photographs on nearly every page along with cartoons and other graphics. Its circulation grew, from about 3,000 in 1908 to 40,000 in 1911, and it became "the major national monthly organ for the geographically dispersed left wing". In addition to its value as a tool for recruiting movement activists, Kerr also viewed ISR as a promotional vehicle for his publishing company. In each issue, he chronicled the history of the firm, its challenges and successes, in an effort "to maintain the magazine and the book and pamphlet ends of the operation as parts of a viable socialist cooperative business venture."

During World War I, the U.S. government cracked down on socialists who were agitating against American involvement in the war. The postmaster general denied mailing privileges to all Kerr publications, alleging them to be seditious violations of the Espionage Act of 1917. The ban dealt a fatal blow to the ISR, never a profitable publication in the best of times. It ceased operations in 1918. In that same year, the Canadian federal government issued an Order in Council that made it illegal for a Canadian citizen to possess any literature published by Charles H. Kerr & Co., under penalty of a $5,000 fine or five years' imprisonment.

=== PPA ownership ===
In the aftermath of WWI, Kerr developed a close working relationship with the Scottish-born Detroit radical John Keracher through the latter's "Proletarian University" movement and its need to print Marxist literature. In 1920, Keracher led a faction out of the underground Communist Party of America and established a small rival organization, the Proletarian Party of America (PPA). In 1924, Keracher became a member of the Kerr Board of Directors. Four years later, Charles Kerr sold his controlling shares in the firm to Keracher and the PPA.

Thereafter, the PPA published a number of Keracher's works, including How the Gods Were Made (1929), Producers and Parasites (1935), The Head-Fixing Industry (1935), Crime: Its Causes and Consequences (1937), and Frederick Engels (1946). After Keracher's retirement in 1953, the Kerr company was run by PPA National Secretary Al Wysocki. By the 1960s, the PPA membership had shrunk and the publishing company was reduced to a small mail-order firm. The situation became more dire in 1970 when Wysocki was diagnosed with cancer. Allen Ruff describes what happened next:

Wysocki looked for some way to save Kerr & Company from extinction, and in 1971 he contacted Fred Thompson, a long-time socialist and IWW activist historian. Thompson organized a meeting at Wysocki's apartment that included the Chicago socialists Burt Rosen and Virgil Vogel and a life-long anarchist, Irving Abrams, who had been a law partner of Clarence Darrow. Wysocki transferred control of the firm to those present. The new caretakers formed a board of directors, eventually expanded to ten members, which elected Vogel as president, Thompson as vice president, and Rosen as secretary. The newly constituted board adopted a statement of policy that committed the company to the nonsectarian publication and dissemination of socialist literature.

=== New ownership in the 1970s ===
The Chicago-based radicals who kept Charles H. Kerr & Co. alive chose a new moniker, the Charles H. Kerr Publishing Company. When Vogel resigned as president in 1973, the Chicago labor activist Joseph Giganti replaced him. In subsequent years, the rebranded company's major publications included Haymarket Scrapbook (1986) edited by David Roediger and Franklin Rosemont (a 2nd edition was published in 2011), and "The Big Red Songbook" (2016), an anthology of "Wobbly" songs and essays edited by folklorist Archie Green, et al. The company's web page features the motto, "Subversive literature for the whole family since 1886".

In the 2020s, the company continued to publish left-wing books and memorabilia—usually distributed via AK Press—such as Beyond the Internationale: Revolutionary Writing (2023), Jobs, Jive, & Joy: An Argument for the Utopian Spirit (2024), and One Big Union: 15 Wobbly Postcards (2025).

== Company publications ==
=== Magazines ===
- Unity (1886–1893)
- New Occasions (1893–1897)
- The New Time (1897–1899)
- International Socialist Review (1900–1918)

=== International Library of Social Science ===
The International Library of Social Science, started at the beginning of 1906, was a collection of volumes described as "positively indispensable to the student of socialism." Each volume cost US$1 (equivalent to $36 in 2025).

Number	Title	Author
1	The Changing Order	Oscar Lovell Triggs
2	Better-World Philosophy	J. Howard Moore
3	The Universal Kinship	J. Howard Moore
4	Principles of Scientific Socialism	Charles H. Vail
5	Some of the Philosophical Essays of Joseph Dietzgen	Joseph Dietzgen
6	Essays on the Materialist Conception of History	Antonio Labriola
7	Love's Coming-of-Age	Edward Carpenter
8	Looking Forward: A Treatise on the Status of Woman, etc.	Philip Rappaport
9	The Positive Outcome of Philosophy	Joseph Dietzgen
10	Socialism and Philosophy	Antonio Labriola
11	The Physical Basis of Man and Morals	M. H. Fitch
12	Revolutionary Essays in Socialist Faith and Fancy	Peter E. Burrowes
13	Marxian Economics	Ernest Untermann
14	The Rise of the American Proletarian	Austin Lewis
15	The Theoretical System of Karl Marx	Louis B. Boudin
16	Landmarks of Scientific Socialism: Anti-Duehring	Friedrich Engels
17	The Republic, a Modern Dialog	N. P. Andresen
18	God and My Neighbor	Robert Blatchford
19	The Common Sense of Socialism	John Spargo
20	Socialism and Modern Science	Enrico Ferri
21	Industrial Problems	N. A. Richardson
22	The Poverty of Philosophy	Karl Marx
