= Christian M. Madsen =

American politician (1869–1953)

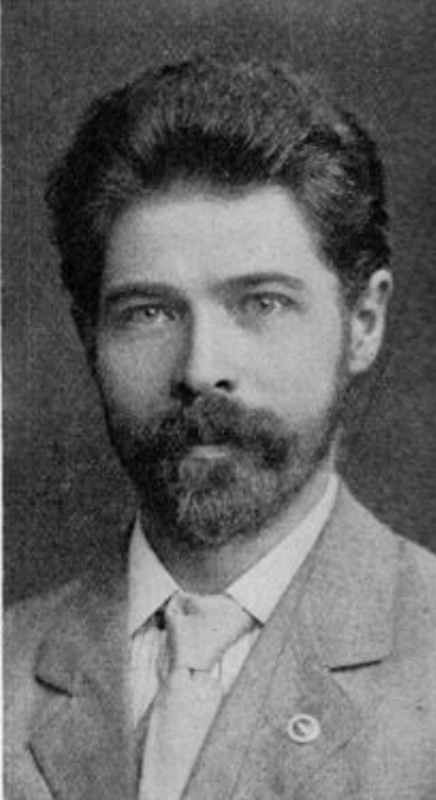
- Madsen in 1913

Member of the Illinois House of Representatives
- In office 1913–1917

Personal details
- Born: Christian M. Madsen; September 5, 1869 Gammelby, Thy, Denmark
- Died: June 1953 (aged 83) Chicago, Illinois, US
- Resting place: Acacia Park Cemetery
- Party: Socialist
- Occupation: Painter, decorator, politician

Christian M. Madsen (September 5, 1869 – June 1953) was an American politician who served as a Socialist member of the Illinois House of Representatives from 1913 to 1917.

== Biography ==
Madsen was born in Gammelby, Thy, Denmark on September 5, 1869. He was educated at Royal Danish Academy of Fine Arts. He immigrated to the United States in 1892, settling in the Humboldt Park neighborhood of Chicago. A painter and decorator by trade, he served as secretary of the largest local union of Painters, Decorators and Paperhangers in America, Local Union No. 194.

In the 1912 general election for the Illinois House of Representatives, four socialists were elected and three were seated. The other seated socialists were Joseph Mason and Seymour Stedman. In 1914, Mason was reelected to a second and final term.

He died at Norwegian American Hospital in Chicago in late June 1953, and was buried at Acacia Park Cemetery.
