= Joseph Mason (Illinois politician) =

American politician (1871-?)

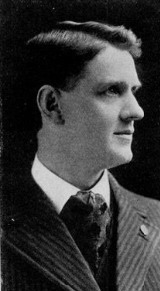
Mason in 1913

Joseph M. Mason (born June 24, 1871) was an American politician who served as a Socialist member of the Illinois House of Representatives.

== Biographical sketch ==
Mason was born June 24, 1871, in Liverpool, England. He moved to Ottawa, Canada in 1887 and in 1894 he moved to Chicago. He was an iron moulder and served as the President of the Iron Moulder's Union.

In the 1912 general election for the Illinois House of Representatives, four socialists were elected and three were seated. The other seated socialists were Christian M. Madsen and Seymour Stedman. In 1914, Mason was reelected to a second and final term.
