= International Socialist Review (1900) =

American monthly socialist magazine (1900–1918)

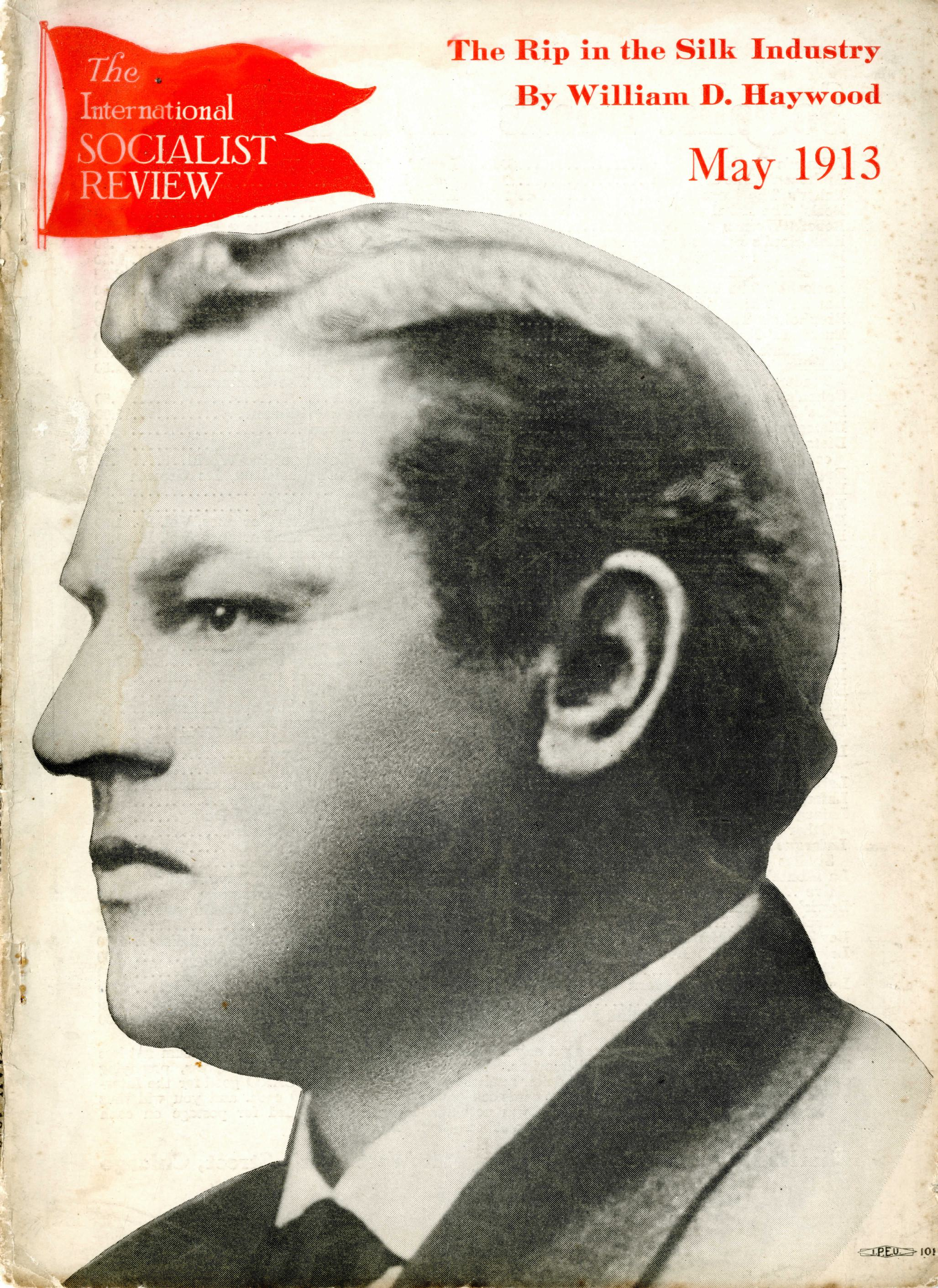
- The International Socialist Review became a prominent voice for the Socialist Party's left wing. After 1908, it strongly supported the Industrial Workers of the World.
- Categories: Marxist theory, labor movement
- Frequency: Monthly
- Publisher: Charles H. Kerr & Co.
- First issue: July 1900
- Final issue: February 1918
- Country: United States
- Based in: Chicago, Illinois
- Language: English

The International Socialist Review was a monthly magazine published in Chicago, Illinois by Charles H. Kerr & Co. from 1900 to 1918. Initially, under the editorship of A. M. Simons, the magazine primarily served as a Marxist theoretical journal, focusing on Marxist analysis and discussion. In 1908, the publication shifted further to the left when publisher Charles H. Kerr assumed editorial responsibilities. The later Review (as contemporaries called it) adopted a more dynamic format, incorporating photographic illustrations on glossy paper and blending news of the contemporary labor movement with theoretical content.

Throughout its run, the International Socialist Review was loyal to the Socialist Party of America and became a leading voice for the party's left wing. After 1908, it championed the cause of revolutionary socialism, opposing efforts to transform the Socialist Party into a vehicle for moderate reforms. The magazine embraced syndicalism and supported the Industrial Workers of the World (IWW) and their vision of revolutionary industrial unionism. It also criticized the Preparedness Movement and other efforts to promote militarism in the lead-up to World War I. Additionally, the Review provided a platform for leaders of the Zimmerwald Left to communicate their anti-war and revolutionary socialist ideas to an American audience.

Following the United States' entry into World War I in 1917, the International Socialist Review faced increasing pressure from the United States Post Office Department and the United States Department of Justice. The magazine lost its mailing privileges in 1917 due to actions taken by Postmaster General Albert S. Burleson under the administration of President Woodrow Wilson. This government suppression effectively ended the publication, which ceased in early 1918.

An attempt to revive the Review as The Labor Scrapbook in 1918, under the editorship of Mary Marcy, one of Kerr's closest collaborators, was ultimately unsuccessful.

== Publication history ==
=== Simons period (1900–1908) ===
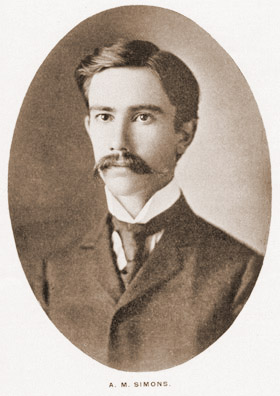
Algie M. Simons, a graduate of the University of Wisconsin, was the first editor of the International Socialist Review.

The International Socialist Review was edited from 1900 to 1908 by Algie M. Simons, a graduate of the University of Wisconsin. Under Simons' editorship, the magazine served as a platform for discussing various theoretical issues that divided the socialist movement.

A central focus of the magazine during Simons' tenure was the relationship between the socialist movement and American farmers. This issue was of particular interest to both Simons, who authored a 1902 book on the subject, and J.A. Wayland, the publisher of the Appeal to Reason, the most widely circulated socialist newspaper of the time.

The tone of the early Review was moderate, reflecting what one historian described as "the rather moderate social-democratic perspective of Simons and other Socialists of the 'Center.'" The policies it advocated were similarly temperate, aligning with the centrist views of its editor and contributors.

The Review began publishing in the summer of 1900 and achieved a modest circulation of about 4,000. Approximately three-quarters of its readers subscribed by mail, with the remainder accessing the magazine through newsstand sales or bundle orders arranged by local socialist organizations.

=== Post-Simons period (1908–1918) ===
Due to a fundamental disagreement over principles—Simons' views becoming increasingly moderate while those of his employer, Charles H. Kerr, grew more radical—publisher Kerr dismissed editor Algie M. Simons in 1908. Kerr sought to transform the previously dry and academic publication into what he described as "the fighting magazine of socialism," utilizing dramatic photography to vividly portray contemporary labor struggles against the forces of capitalism. (Note: The first issue to feature a photograph on the cover was October 1908 and the first to feature multiple photographs was December 1908.)

Mary Marcy played a leading role in shaping the tone and content of the Review after Algie Simons' departure.

As historian Allen Ruff observed, the revitalized International Socialist Review (ISR) adopted a markedly different tone and format:

Liberally illustrated with "action fotos" and original graphics, the revamped ISR carried firsthand reports of major strikes, lockouts, organizing drives, and employers' offensives as well as theoretical and political discussions. Kerr's work with longtime associates Mary and Leslie Marcy and an editorial board including left-wingers William D. 'Big Bill' Haywood, Frank Bohn, and poet/illustrator Ralph Chaplin raised the Review's circulation from nearly 6,000 in 1908 to over 40,000 by 1911.

The Review quickly became the principal organ of the Socialist Party's "left wing," which criticized the party's national leadership for what it perceived as an excessive focus on ameliorative reform. The influence of the Review was further amplified in 1910 with the cessation of The Socialist, a left-wing weekly newspaper published in Seattle, Washington by Hermon F. Titus. This left many of its readers turning to the Review, helping its circulation grow to 27,000 by July 1910.

The moderate faction of the Socialist Party was often sharply critical of the Review. For instance, writer Robert Hunter declared in 1911:

It has sneered at Political Action, advocated rival unionism, and vacillated between Anarchism and Proudhonism. The constant emphasis The Review lays on Direct Action and its apparent faith that a revolution can be evoked by Will or Force is in direct opposition to our whole philosophy.

Despite such criticism, the Review maintained a strong sympathy for the Industrial Workers of the World (IWW), a revolutionary industrial union that aimed to unite all workers, regardless of race, craft, or skill, under the banner of "One Big Union." The IWW's ultimate goal was the abolition of the wage system and its replacement with a system of worker-managed economic units, a concept rooted in syndicalism.

== Prominent staff members ==
- Max S. Hayes
- Charles H. Kerr
- Mary Marcy
- A. M. Simons
- Ernest Untermann

== Index of volumes ==
Volume	First issue	Last issue	Editor	Online availability
1	July 1900	June 1901	Simons	Archive.org
2	July 1901	June 1902	Simons	Archive.org
3	July 1902	June 1903	Simons	Archive.org
4	July 1903	June 1904	Simons	Archive.org
5	July 1904	June 1905	Simons	Archive.org
6	July 1905	June 1906	Simons	Archive.org
7	July 1906	June 1907	Simons	Archive.org
8	July 1907	June 1908	Simons/Kerr	Archive.org
9	July 1908	June 1909	Kerr	Archive.org
10	July 1909	June 1910	Kerr	Archive.org
11	July 1910	June 1911	Kerr	Archive.org
12	July 1911	June 1912	Kerr	Archive.org
13	July 1912	June 1913	Kerr	Archive.org
14	July 1913	June 1914	Kerr	Archive.org
15	July 1914	June 1915	Kerr	Archive.org
16	July 1915	June 1916	Kerr	Archive.org
17	July 1916	June 1917	Kerr	Archive.org
18	July 1917	February 1918	Kerr	Archive.org

== External sources ==
- Media related to International Socialist Review (1900-1918) at Wikimedia Commons
- International Socialist Review archive at marxists.org
