= Ralph Chaplin =

American writer, artist and labor activist

Ralph Hosea Chaplin
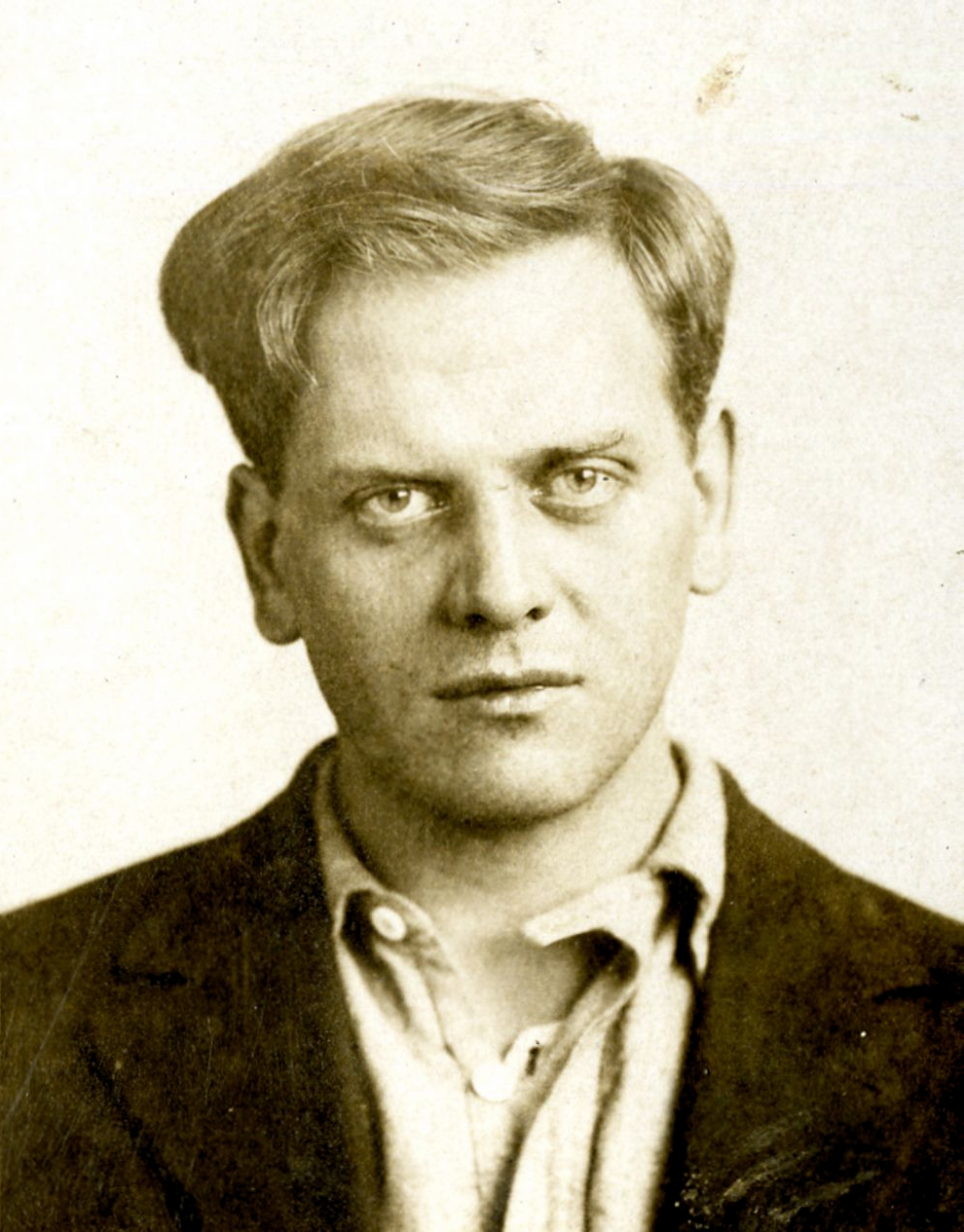
- Born: 1887; Ames, Kansas, U.S.
- Died: 1961
- Occupations: Labor activist, songwriter, illustrator

Ralph Hosea Chaplin (1887–1961) was an American writer, artist and labor activist.

== Background ==
Chaplin was born in 1887. At the age of seven, he saw a worker shot dead during the Pullman Strike in Chicago, Illinois. He had moved with his family from Ames, Kansas to Chicago in 1893.

== Career ==
Charles H. Kerr 1911 series stock certificate illustrated by Chaplin

During a time in Mexico he was influenced by hearing of the execution squads established by Porfirio Díaz, and became a supporter of Emiliano Zapata.

On his return, he began work in various union positions, most of which were poorly paid. Some of Chaplin's early artwork was done for the International Socialist Review and other Charles H. Kerr publications.

For two years Chaplin worked in the strike committee with Mother Jones for the bloody Kanawha County, West Virginia strike of coal miners in 1912–13. These influences led him to write a number of labor oriented poems, one of which became the words for the oft-sung union anthem, "Solidarity Forever".

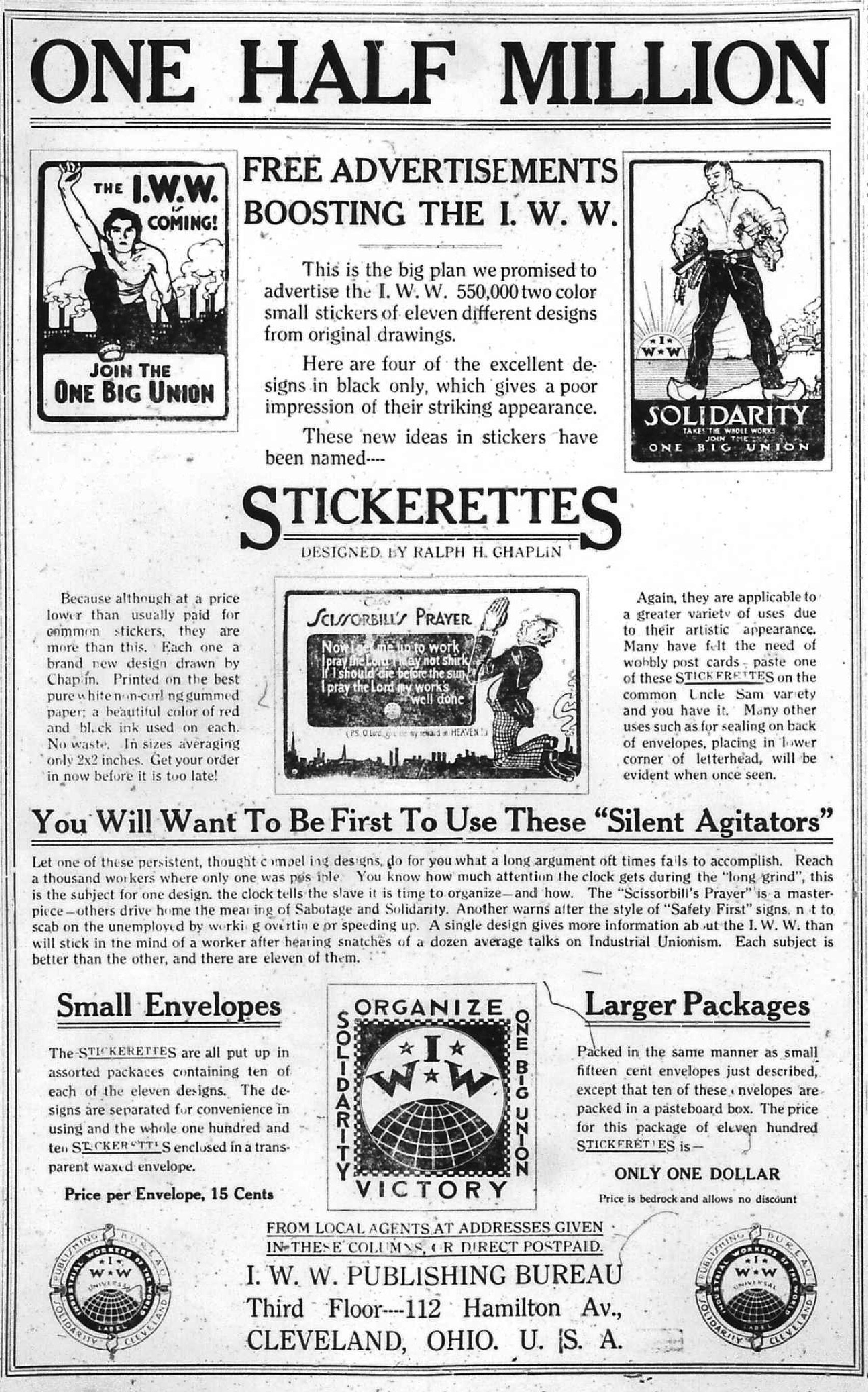
Advertisement for IWW stickerettes in "Solidarity" publication

Chaplin then became active in the Industrial Workers of the World (the IWW, or "Wobblies") and became editor of its eastern U.S. publication Solidarity. In 1917 Chaplin and some 100 other Wobblies were rounded up, convicted, and jailed under the Espionage Act of 1917 for conspiring to hinder the draft and encourage desertion. He wrote Bars And Shadows: The Prison Poems while serving four years of a 20-year sentence.

Although he continued to work for labor rights after his release from prison, Chaplin was very disillusioned by the aftermath of the Russian Revolution and the evolution of the Soviet state and international communism, particularly its involvement in American politics and unions in 1920–1948, as he details in his autobiography, Wobbly.

Chaplin maintained his involvement with the IWW, serving in Chicago as editor of its newspaper, the Industrial Worker, from 1932 to 1936. Chaplin left the IWW in 1936.

Eventually Chaplin settled in Tacoma, Washington, where he edited the American Federation of Labor's local labor publication. He converted to Roman Catholicism and published his autobiography Wobbly. From 1949 until his death, he was curator of manuscripts for the Washington State Historical Society.

== Death and legacy ==
Chaplin died in 1961.

Chaplin likely designed the IWW black cat (also adopted as a symbol by anarcho-syndicalists)

According to the IWW, Chaplin likely designed the now widely used anarcho-syndicalist image, the black cat. In 2022, law professor Ahmed White mentioned him in his book on the IWW called Under the Iron Heel.

== Works ==
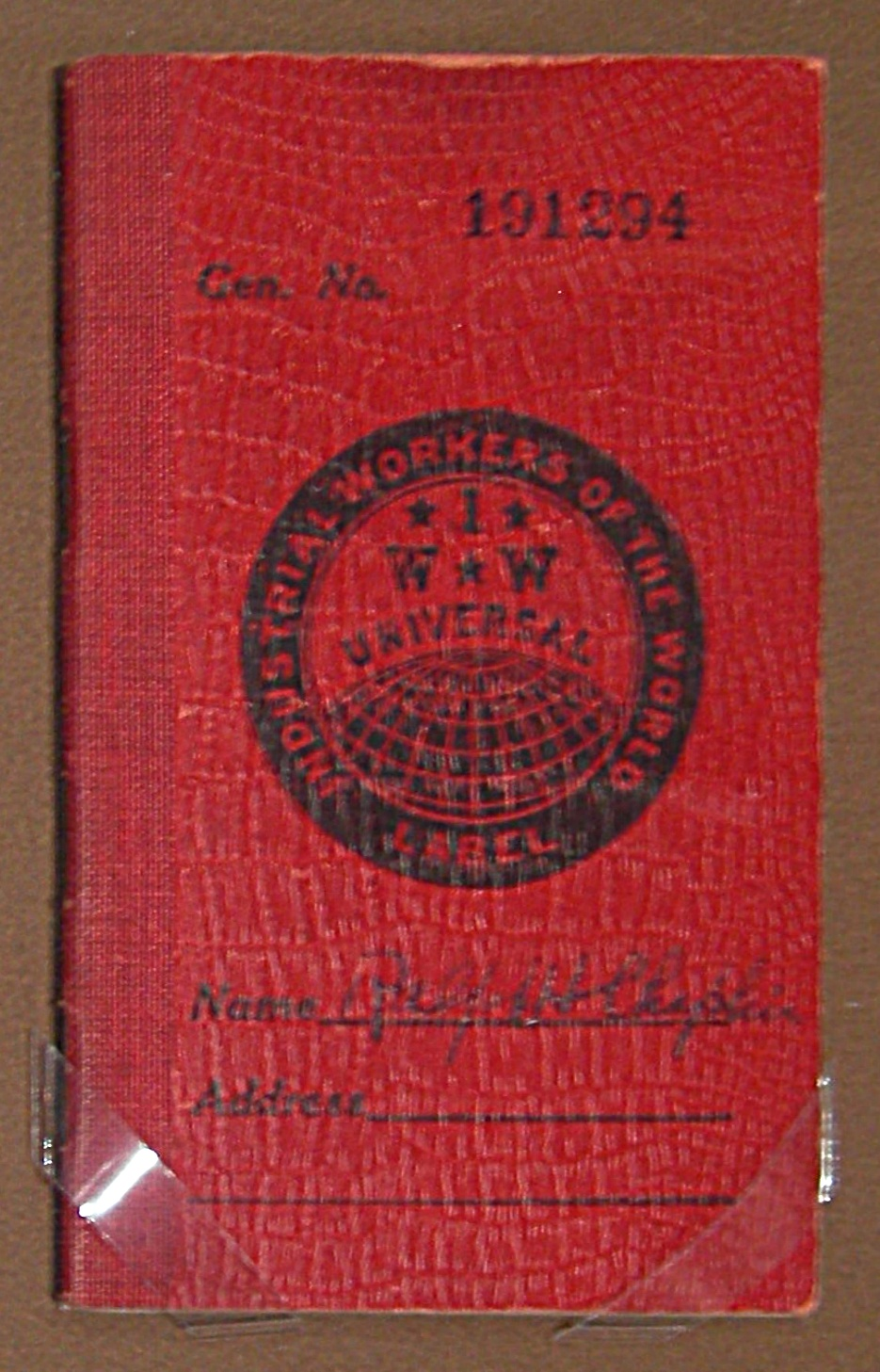
Chaplin's IWW membership booklet

There are ten entries for Chaplin's works in the Library of Congress online catalog.

Illustrations

- Out of the Dump (1909)

Poetry

- When the Leaves Come Out and Other Rebel Verses (1917)
- Bars and Shadows: The Prison Poems (1922)
  - Bars and Shadows: The Prison Poems (1923)

Nonfiction

- The Centralia Conspiracy (1920)
  - The Centralia Conspiracy: The Truth About the Armistice Tragedy (1924)
  - Centralia Case: Three Views (1971)
- American Labor's Case Against Communism: How the Operations of Stalin's Red Quislings Look from Inside the Labor Movement (1947)
- Wobbly: The Rough-and-Tumble Story of an American Radical (1948)
  - Wobbly: The Rough-and-Tumble Story of an American Radical (1972)

Articles

- "Confessions of a Radical," two-part article in Empire Magazine of the Denver Post (February 17, 1957, pp. 12–13, and February 24, 1957, pp. 10–11)
- "Why I Wrote Solidarity Forever," American West, vol. 5, no. 1 (January 1968), 18–27, 73

== See also ==
- Solidarity Forever
