= Chicago Socialist Party =

- Senate leader: None
- House leader: None
- Founded: 1896
- Headquarters: Chicago, Illinois
- Ideology: Democratic Socialism; Progressivism; Radicalism
- National affiliation: Formerly: Socialist Party of America; since 1973: Socialist Party USA
- Colors: Red

Website
- http://chicagosocialists.org/

The Chicago Socialist Party (CSP) is the local chapter of the Socialist Party USA in Chicago, Illinois, and traces its origins back to the Cook County Socialist Party and the Socialist Party of America. It is a democratic socialist organization that supports numerous progressive and radical causes in an effort to help build a broad-based, multi-tendency socialist movement.

During the early years of the Socialist Party of America, the Chicago Socialist Party was one of the strongest locals in the country.

== Early years ==
According to records at the University of Illinois at Chicago Library: "The Cook County Socialist Party was founded in 1896 as a response to the Pullman strike in Chicago. It held its first convention two years later. In 1901 it joined with other socialists parties in the state to form the Socialist Party of Illinois. The state party affiliated with the national party and its leader Eugene Debs and grew in membership throughout the first two decades of the twentieth century but declined after World War One."

The club was given a flag in 1895. The banner was described as being 2 sided flag with one side having a plain red field, the other bearing the inscription: "Socialistic Labor party of Chicago." Earlier flags used by Socialist in the city were modified American flags, one was bearing a skull and crossed bones while the other had a yellow cross beneath the stars.

After the Socialist Party unified in 1901, prominent socialist activists contended for control of Chicago Socialist Party; these included Algie Martin Simons, Barney Berlyn, Thomas J. Morgan and Seymour Stedman.

== 1973 reorganization ==
In 2005 the CSP's charter was suspended due to several officers not paying their dues and who later left the Party. The charter was later reinstated once a functioning Local Executive Committee of members in good standing was elected.

The CSP's long-term objective is to establish a radical democracy, a non-racist, classless, feminist, socialist society in which people cooperate at work, at home, and in the community and in which working people have control over their own lives. The CSP works cooperatively with numerous progressive and radical organizations and independent activists.

While the Socialist Party regularly runs candidates for elected office, restrictive ballot access laws in Illinois result in few Socialist candidates running in that state, mainly as write-in candidates. The CSP functions primarily as activist organization, working in support of the labor movement, anti-war campaigns, prison outreach, and policy advocacy. Members have also been involved in educational efforts such as establishing radical resource centers and organizing forums, speakers, classes, film screenings, and book discussions on progressive and radical issues.

In 2012 CSP members filed petitions to put the Socialist Party's presidential candidate Stewart Alexander and vice presidential candidate Alex Mendoza on the Illinois ballot under the state's "challenge rule" which meant that if no one challenged the petitions the party would be on the November ballot. The Socialist Party's petitions, along with three other minor/independent parties were challenged by two members of the Illinois Green Party, Rob Sherman, Chair of the Cook County Green Party and Andy Finko, a lawyer who represents the Illinois Green Party. Despite pleas from Green Party presidential candidate Jill Stein and other prominent Greens to drop the challenges, Sherman and Finko did not do so and the result was that the Socialist Party and three other parties were kicked off the ballot.

In 2014 the Chicago Socialist Party joined with other socialists and activists to form the Chicago Socialist Campaign. The goal was to emulate the campaign of Kshama Sawant of Seattle and run a socialist candidate for Alderman in 2015. In May 2014 the Campaign chose Jorge Mújica, a long-time immigrant rights and labor organizer, to run for alderman in Chicago's 25th ward. In the March 2015 election Mujica, running as an open socialist, received 907 votes, 12.15% of the total vote.
