= List of members of the Socialist Party of America =

This is a selectively annotated list of the most prominent or important members of the Socialist Party of America (1901–1972).

== Summary list ==
Key:

* Went on to join the Communist Party, Communist Labor Party of America or Workers Party of America
^{ISS} A founder or key member of the Intercollegiate Socialist Society, 1905, later League for Industrial Democracy
^{IWW} A founder of the Industrial Workers of the World, 1905.
^{SDL} Left to found the Social Democratic League of America, 1917.
^{SDF} Left to found the Social Democratic Federation, 1936.
^{IPN} Left to found the Independent Party of Norwalk, 1951
^{SDUSA} Continued into Social Democrats, USA, 1973
^{SPUSA} Went on to join the Socialist Party USA, 1973
^{DSOC} Went on to join the Democratic Socialist Organizing Committee, 1973, later Democratic Socialists of America

- Martin Abern *
- Devere Allen
- Elmer Allison *
- Harry Ault
- J. Mahlon Barnes
- David P. Berenberg
- Victor L. Berger
- Barney Berlyn
- Allan L. Benson
- Ella Reeve Bloor *
- Nikolai Bukharin
- Roy E. Burt
- Frank Bohn ^{IWW}
- Earl Browder*
- Jack Carney *
- James P. Cannon *
- John C. Chase
- Travers Clement
- Joseph Coldwell
- James Connolly
- Eugene V. Debs ^{IWW}
- Nicholas Dozenberg *
- David Dubinsky
- Max Eastman *
- J. Louis Engdahl
- Elizabeth Gurley Flynn *
- William Z. Foster *
- Louis Fraina *
- Joseph Freeman *
- Irving Freese ^{IPN}
- Samuel Friedman ^{SPUSA}
- Julius Gerber
- Adolph Germer
- Arturo Giovannitti
- Benjamin Gitlow *
- Carl Haessler *
- Emanuel Haldeman-Julius ^{SDL}
- Job Harriman
- Michael Harrington ^{DSOC}
- Hubert Harrison
- Max S. Hayes
- Bill Haywood ^{IWW}
- Emil Herman
- George D. Herron
- Morris Hillquit ^{ISS}
- Daniel Hoan
- Darlington Hoopes ^{SPUSA}
- Jessie Wallace Hughan ^{ISS}
- Haim Kantorovitch
- David Karsner
- Helen Keller
- Charles H. Kerr
- George R. Kirkpatrick
- Alexandra Kollontai
- Antoinette Konikow *
- Frederick Krafft
- Maynard C. Krueger
- William F. Kruse *
- Leo Krzycki
- Harry W. Laidler ^{ISS}
- Algernon Lee ^{ISS, SDF}
- Lena Morrow Lewis ^{SDF}
- Walter Lippman
- Jack London ^{ISS}
- George Lunn
- Theresa S. Malkiel
- Mary Marcy
- James H. Maurer ^{SDF}
- Jasper McLevy ^{SDF}
- David McReynolds ^{SPUSA}
- Walter Thomas Mills
- Tom Mooney
- Thomas J. Morgan
- Gustavus Myers
- Scott Nearing
- Reinhold Niebuhr
- Santeri Nuorteva
- Kate Richards O'Hare
- James Oneal ^{SDF}
- Mary White Ovington
- Joseph Arthur Padway
- Jacob Panken
- Patrick L. Quinlan
- A. Philip Randolph ^{SDF, SDUSA}
- John Reed *
- Victor Reuther ^{DSOC}
- Walter Reuther
- Charles Edward Russell
- Bayard Rustin ^{SDUSA}
- Carl Sandburg
- Margaret Sanger
- Roland D. Sawyer
- Clarence Senior
- Max Shachtman
- Abraham Shiplacoff
- Upton Sinclair ^{ISS}
- John W. Slayton
- John Spargo ^{SDL}
- Seymour Stedman
- Charles P. Steinmetz
- A.M. Stirton
- J.G. Phelps Stokes ^{ISS, SDL}
- Rose Pastor Stokes *
- Maurice Sugar
- Norman Thomas
- Henry M. Tichenor
- Hermon F. Titus
- Gus Tyler
- Ernest Untermann
- Charles H. Vail
- Baruch Charney Vladeck
- Alfred Wagenknecht *
- Louis Waldman ^{SDF}
- Julius Wayland
- George W. Woodbey
- John M. Work
- Frank P. Zeidler ^{SPUSA}

== Annotated list ==
Key:

* Went on to join the Communist Party, Communist Labor Party of America or Workers Party of America
^{ISS} A founder or key member of the Intercollegiate Socialist Society, 1905, later League for Industrial Democracy
^{IWW} A founder of the Industrial Workers of the World, 1905.
^{SDL} Left to found the Social Democratic League of America, 1917.
^{SDF} Left to found the Social Democratic Federation, 1936.
^{SDUSA} Continued into Social Democrats, USA, 1973
^{SPUSA} Went on to join the Socialist Party USA, 1973
^{DSOC} Went on to join the Democratic Socialist Organizing Committee, 1973, later Democratic Socialists of America

- Martin Abern *
- Devere Allen
- Elmer Allison *
- E.B. "Harry" Ault
- J. Mahlon Barnes
- David P. Berenberg
- Victor L. Berger, Congressman from Milwaukee
- Barney Berlyn
- Allan L. Benson, 1916 candidate for Vice-President
- Ella Reeve Bloor *
- Roy E. Burt
- Frank Bohn ^{IWW}
- Earl Browder *, Communist Party leader and presidential candidate
- James P. Cannon *, leader of the Communist Party and Socialist Workers Party
- Jack Carney
- Travers Clement
- Joseph Coldwell
- James Connolly, Irish labor and nationalist leader
- Eugene V. Debs ^{IWW}, labor organizer, Presidential candidate
- David Dubinsky, labor leader
- Max Eastman *, writer
- J. Louis Engdahl
- William M. Feigenbaum, New York assemblyman 1918
- Elizabeth Gurley Flynn *, IWW and Communist leader
- William Z. Foster *, Communist leader and presidential candidate
- Louis Fraina *
- Joseph Freeman *
- Samuel Friedman, Vice-presidential candidate
- Charles B. Garfinkel, New York assemblyman 1918, temporary chairman of the NYC central committee SPA in 1935 after Old Guard was expelled
- Julius Gerber
- Adolph Germer
- Arturo Giovannitti
- Benjamin Gitlow *
- Carl Haessler *
- Emanuel Haldeman-Julius ^{SDL}
- Job Harriman, Vice-presidential candidate
- Michael Harrington ^{DSOC}, author
- Hubert Harrison
- Max S. Hayes, labor leader
- Bill Haywood ^{IWW}
- Emil Herman
- George D. Herron
- Morris Hillquit ^{ISS}, labor lawyer, New York mayoral candidate
- Daniel Hoan, mayor of Milwaukee
- Darlington Hoopes ^{SPUSA}
- Jessie Wallace Hughan ^{ISS}
- Henry Jager, NY assemblyman 1921
- Haim Kantorovitch
- William Karlin^{SDF}, lawyer, NY assemblyman 1918
- Helen Keller
- Charles H. Kerr, publisher
- George R. Kirkpatrick
- Antoinette Konikow *
- Frederick Krafft
- Maynard C. Krueger
- William F. Kruse *
- Leo Krzycki, chairman
- Harry W. Laidler ^{ISS}
- Algernon Lee ^{ISS, SDF}
- Walter Lippman, journalist
- Jack London ^{ISS}
- Meyer London, Congressman from New York City
- George R. Lunn, mayor of Schenectady, New York
- Theresa S. Malkiel
- Mary Marcy
- James H. Maurer ^{SDF}
- Jasper McLevy ^{SDF}, mayor of Bridgeport, Connecticut
- David McReynolds ^{SPUSA}, peace advocate, SPUSA presidential candidate
- Herbert M. Merrill, secretary of the SPA-NY, first Socialist New York assemblyman (1912)
- Walter Thomas Mills
- Tom Mooney
- Thomas J. Morgan
- Gustavus Myers
- Scott Nearing
- Reinhold Niebuhr, theologian
- Santeri Nuorteva
- Kate Richards O'Hare
- James Oneal ^{SDF}
- Mary White Ovington, co-founder of the NAACP
- Joseph Arthur Padway
- Jacob Panken, New York municipal judge
- A. Philip Randolph ^{SDF, SDUSA}, labor and civil rights leader
- John Reed *, author
- Victor Reuther ^{DSOC}, labor organizer
- Walter Reuther, labor organizer
- Elmer Rosenberg, New York assemblyman 1918
- Charles Edward Russell, writer
- Bayard Rustin ^{SDUSA}, civil rights organizer
- Carl Sandburg, poet
- Margaret Sanger, advocate of family planning
- Roland D. Sawyer
- Edmund Seidel, New York state senator 1921–1922
- Clarence Senior
- Max Shachtman
- Abraham I. Shiplacoff, NY assemblyman 1916, 1917, 1918
- Upton Sinclair ^{ISS}, writer, organized End Poverty in California (EPIC)
- John W. Slayton
- John Spargo ^{SDL}, writer
- Seymour Stedman
- Charles P. Steinmetz, physicist
- A.M. Stirton, publisher of The Wage Slave, candidate for governor in Michigan in 1908
- J.G. Phelps Stokes ^{ISS, SDL}, social reformer
- Rose Pastor Stokes *, social reformer
- Maurice Sugar
- Norman Thomas, peace advocate, Presidential candidate
- Henry M. Tichenor
- Hermon F. Titus
- Gus Tyler, writer and labor leader
- Ernest Untermann
- Charles H. Vail
- Baruch Charney Vladeck
- Alfred Wagenknecht *
- Louis Waldman ^{SDF}
- Julius Wayland, publisher of The Appeal to Reason
- Joseph A. Whitehorn, lawyer, New York assemblyman 1917, 1918
- George W. Woodbey, preacher and African-American leader
- John M. Work
- Frank P. Zeidler ^{SPUSA}, mayor of Milwaukee, SPUSA presidential candidate
