= Billy Sunday =

American evangelist and baseball player (1862–1935)

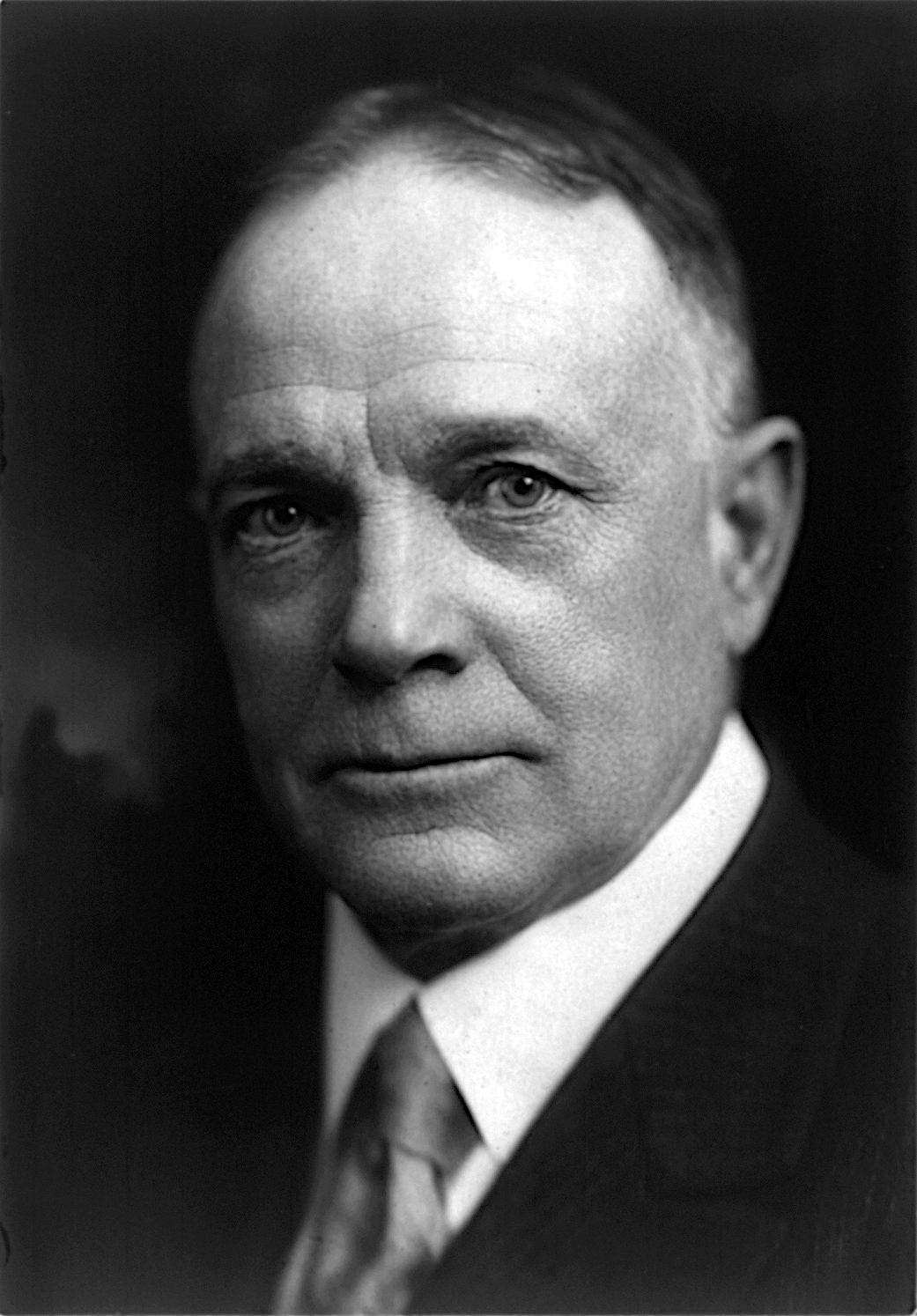
- Billy Sunday (1921)
- Born: William Ashley Sunday; November 19, 1862; Ames, Iowa, U.S.
- Died: November 6, 1935 (aged 72); Chicago, Illinois, U.S.
- Resting place: Forest Home Cemetery, Forest Park, Illinois
- Occupations: Baseball player Christian evangelist
- Spouse: Helen Thompson Sunday (m. 1888)
- Children: 4
- Baseball career
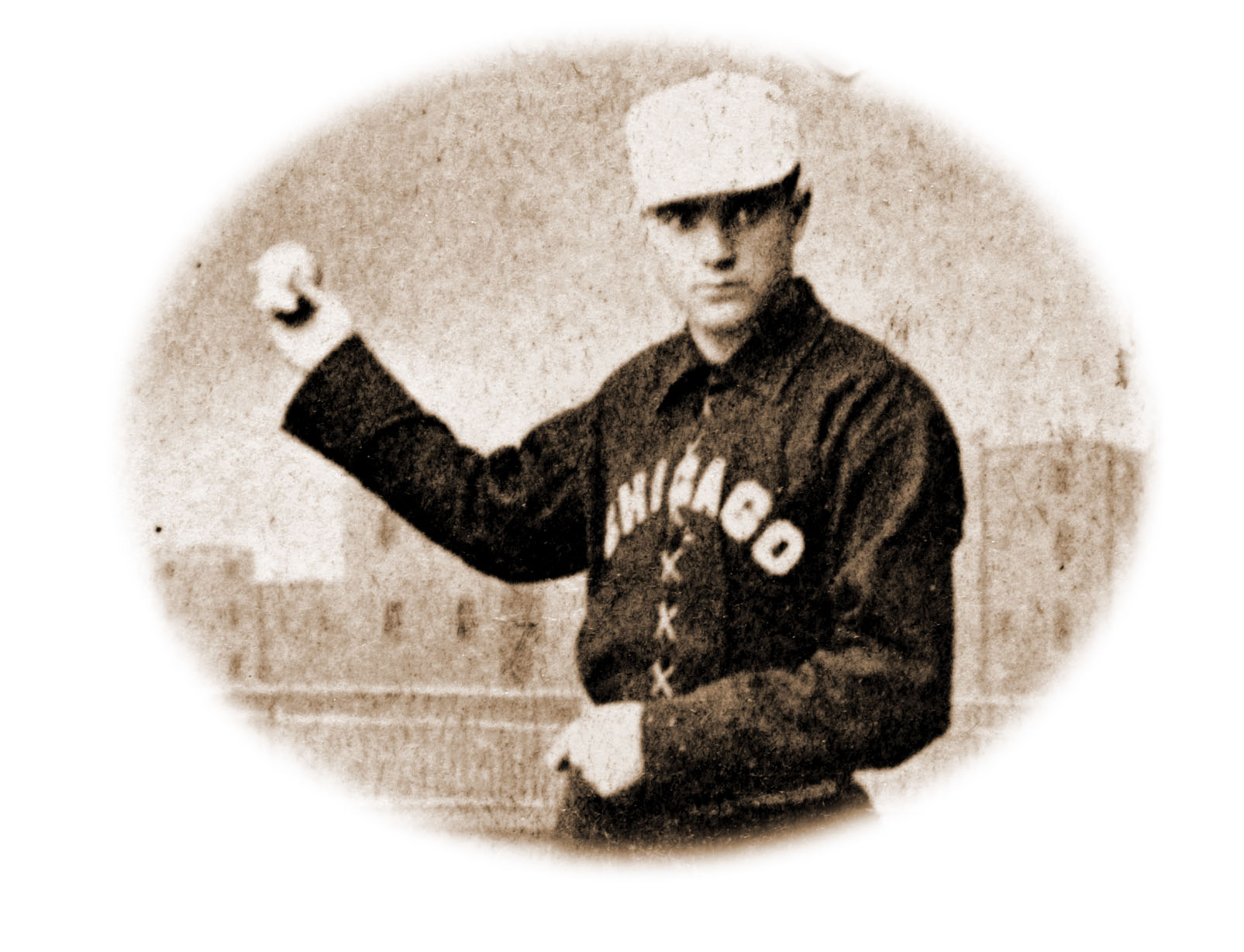
- Outfielder
- Batted: Left Threw: Right

MLB debut
- May 22, 1883, for the Chicago White Stockings

Last MLB appearance
- October 4, 1890, for the Philadelphia Phillies

MLB statistics
- Batting average: .248
- Home runs: 12
- Runs batted in: 170
- Stolen bases: 246
- Stats at Baseball Reference

Teams
- Chicago White Stockings (1883–1887); Pittsburgh Alleghenys (1888–1890); Philadelphia Phillies (1890)

Career highlights and awards
- National League pennant (1885, 1886)

William Ashley Sunday (November 19, 1862 – November 6, 1935) was an American evangelist and professional baseball outfielder. He played for eight seasons in the National League before becoming the most influential American preacher during the first two decades of the 20th century.

Born into poverty near Ames, Iowa, Sunday spent some years at the Iowa Soldiers' Orphans' Home before working at odd jobs and playing for local running and baseball teams. His speed and agility provided him the opportunity to play baseball in the major leagues for eight years.

Converting to evangelical Christianity in the 1880s, Sunday left baseball for the Christian ministry. During the early 20th century, he became the nation's most famous evangelist with his colloquial sermons and frenetic delivery. Sunday held widely reported campaigns in America's largest cities, and he attracted the largest crowds of any evangelist before the advent of electronic sound systems. Sunday was a strong supporter of Prohibition, and his preaching likely played a significant role in the adoption of the Eighteenth Amendment in 1919. Though his audiences grew smaller during the 1920s, Sunday continued to preach and promote conservative Christianity until his death.

== Early life ==
Billy Sunday was born near Ames, Iowa. His father, William Sunday, was the son of a German Americans named Sonntag, who had anglicized their name to "Sunday" when they settled in Chambersburg, Pennsylvania. William Sunday was a bricklayer who worked his way to Iowa, where he married Mary Jane Corey, daughter of "Squire" Martin Corey, a local farmer, miller, blacksmith, and wheelwright. William Sunday enlisted in the Iowa Twenty-Third Volunteer Infantry on August 14, 1862. He died four months later of pneumonia at an army camp in Patterson, Missouri, five weeks after the birth of his youngest son, William Ashley. Mary Jane Sunday and her children moved in with her parents for a few years, and young Billy became close to his grandparents and especially his grandmother. Mary Jane Sunday later remarried, but her second husband soon deserted the family.

When Billy Sunday was ten years old, his impoverished mother sent him and an older brother to the Soldiers' Orphans Home in Glenwood, Iowa, and later to the Iowa Soldiers' Orphans' Home in Davenport, Iowa. At the orphanage, Sunday gained orderly habits, a decent primary education, and the realization that he was a good athlete.

By fourteen, Sunday was shifting for himself. In Nevada, Iowa, he worked for Colonel John Scott, a former lieutenant governor, tending Shetland ponies and doing other farm chores. The Scotts provided Sunday a good home and the opportunity to attend Nevada High School. Although Sunday never received a high school diploma, by 1880 he was better educated than many of his contemporaries.

In 1880, Sunday relocated to Marshalltown, Iowa, where, because of his athleticism, he had been recruited for a fire brigade team. In Marshalltown, Sunday worked at odd jobs, competed in fire brigade tournaments, and played for the town baseball team.

== Professional baseball player ==
Sunday's professional baseball career was launched by Cap Anson, a Marshalltown native and future Hall of Famer, after his aunt, an avid fan of the Marshalltown team, gave him an enthusiastic account of Sunday's prowess. In 1883, on Anson's recommendation, A.G. Spalding, president of the Chicago White Stockings, signed Sunday to the defending National League champions.

Sunday struck out four times in his first game, and there were seven more strikeouts and three more games before he got a hit. During his first four seasons with Chicago, he was a part-time player, taking Mike "King" Kelly's place in right field when Kelly served as catcher.

Sunday's speed was his greatest asset, and he displayed it both on the basepaths and in the outfield. In 1885, the White Stockings arranged a race between Sunday and Arlie Latham, the fastest runner in the American Association. Sunday won the hundred-yard dash by about ten feet.

Sunday's personality, demeanor, and athleticism made him popular with the fans, as well as with his teammates. Manager Cap Anson considered Sunday reliable enough to make him the team's business manager, which included such duties as handling the ticket receipts and paying the team's travel expenses.

In 1887, when Kelly was sold to another team, Sunday became Chicago's regular right fielder, but an injury limited his playing time to fifty games. During the following winter Sunday was sold to the Pittsburgh Alleghenys for the 1888 season. He was their starting center fielder, playing a full season for the first time in his career. The crowds in Pittsburgh took to Sunday immediately; one reporter wrote that "the whole town is wild over Sunday." Although Pittsburgh had a losing team during the 1888 and 1889 seasons, Sunday performed well in center field and was among the league leaders in stolen bases.

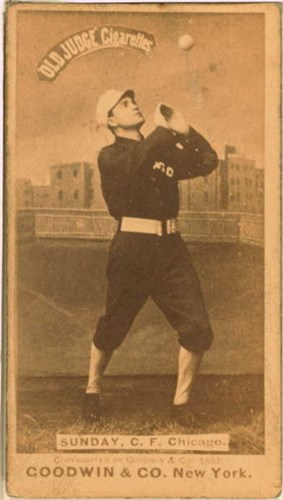
Billy Sunday, Center Fielder, Chicago White Stockings, c. 1887

In 1890, a labor dispute led to the formation of a new league, composed of most of the better players from the National League. Although he was invited to join the competing league, Sunday's conscience would not allow him to break the reserve clause, which allowed Pittsburgh to retain the rights to Sunday after his contract expired. Sunday was named team captain, and he was their star player, but the team suffered one of the worst seasons in baseball history. By August the team had no money to meet its payroll, and Sunday was traded to the Philadelphia Phillies for two players and $1,000 in cash.

The Philadelphia team had an opportunity to win the National League pennant, and the owners hoped that adding Sunday to the roster would improve their chances. Although Sunday played well in his thirty-one games with Philadelphia, the team finished in third place.

In March 1891, Sunday requested and was granted a release from his contract with the Philadelphia ball club. Over his career, Sunday was never much of a hitter: his batting average was .248 over 499 games, about the median for the 1880s. In his best season, in 1887, Sunday hit .291, ranking 17th in the league. He was an exciting but inconsistent fielder. In the days before outfielders wore gloves, Sunday was noted for thrilling catches featuring long sprints and athletic dives, but he also committed a great many errors. Sunday was best known as an exciting base-runner, regarded by his peers as one of the fastest in the game, even though he never placed better than third in the National League in stolen bases.

Sunday remained a prominent baseball fan throughout his life. He gave interviews and opinions about baseball to the popular press; he frequently umpired minor league and amateur games in the cities where he held revivals; and he attended baseball games whenever he could, including a 1935 World Series game two months before he died.

== Conversion ==
On a Sunday afternoon in Chicago, during either the 1886 or 1887 baseball season, Sunday and several of his teammates were out on the town on their day off. At one street corner, they stopped to listen to a gospel preaching team from the Pacific Garden Mission. Attracted by the hymns he had heard his mother sing, Sunday began attending services at the mission. After talking with a former society matron who worked there, Sunday – after some struggle on his part – decided to become a Christian. He began attending the fashionable Jefferson Park Presbyterian Church, a congregation close to both the ball park and his rented room.

Although he socialized with his teammates and sometimes gambled, Sunday was never a heavy drinker. In his autobiography, he said, "I was never drunk but four times in my life. ... I used to go to the saloons with the baseball players, and while they would drink highballs and gin fizzes and beer, I would take lemonade." Following his conversion, Sunday renounced drinking, swearing, and gambling, and he changed his behavior, which was recognized by both teammates and fans. Shortly thereafter, Sunday began speaking in churches and at YMCAs.

== Marriage ==
In 1886, Sunday was introduced at Jefferson Park Presbyterian Church to Helen Amelia "Nell" Thompson, daughter of the owner of one of Chicago's largest dairy products businesses. Although Sunday was immediately smitten with her, both had serious on-going relationships that bordered on engagements. Furthermore, Nell Thompson had grown to maturity in a much more privileged environment than had Sunday, and her father strongly discouraged the courtship, viewing all professional baseball players as "transient ne'er-do-wells who were unstable and destined to be misfits once they were too old to play." Nevertheless, Sunday pursued and eventually married her. On several occasions, Sunday said, "She was a Presbyterian, so I am a Presbyterian. Had she been a Catholic, I would have been a Catholic – because I was hot on the trail of Nell." Her mother liked Sunday from the start and weighed in on his side, and her father finally relented. The couple was married on September 5, 1888.

== Apprenticeship for evangelism ==
In the spring of 1891, Sunday turned down a baseball contract for $3,500 a year to accept a position with the Chicago YMCA at $83 per month. Sunday's job title at the YMCA was Assistant Secretary, yet the position involved a great deal of ministerial work. It proved to be good preparation for his later evangelistic career. For three years Sunday visited the sick, prayed with the troubled, counseled the suicidal, and visited saloons to invite patrons to evangelistic meetings.

In 1893, Sunday became the full-time assistant to J. Wilbur Chapman, one of the best known evangelists in the United States at the time. Chapman was well educated and was a meticulous dresser, "suave and urbane." Personally shy, like Sunday, Chapman commanded respect in the pulpit both because of his strong voice and his sophisticated demeanor. Sunday's job as Chapman's advance man was to precede the evangelist to cities in which he was scheduled to preach, organize prayer meetings and choirs, and in general take care of necessary details. When tents were used, Sunday would often help erect them.

By listening to Chapman preach night after night, Sunday received a valuable course in homiletics. Chapman also critiqued Sunday's own attempts at evangelistic preaching and showed him how to put a good sermon together. Further, Chapman encouraged Sunday's theological development, especially by emphasizing the importance of prayer and by helping to "reinforce Billy's commitment to conservative biblical Christianity."

== Popular evangelist ==
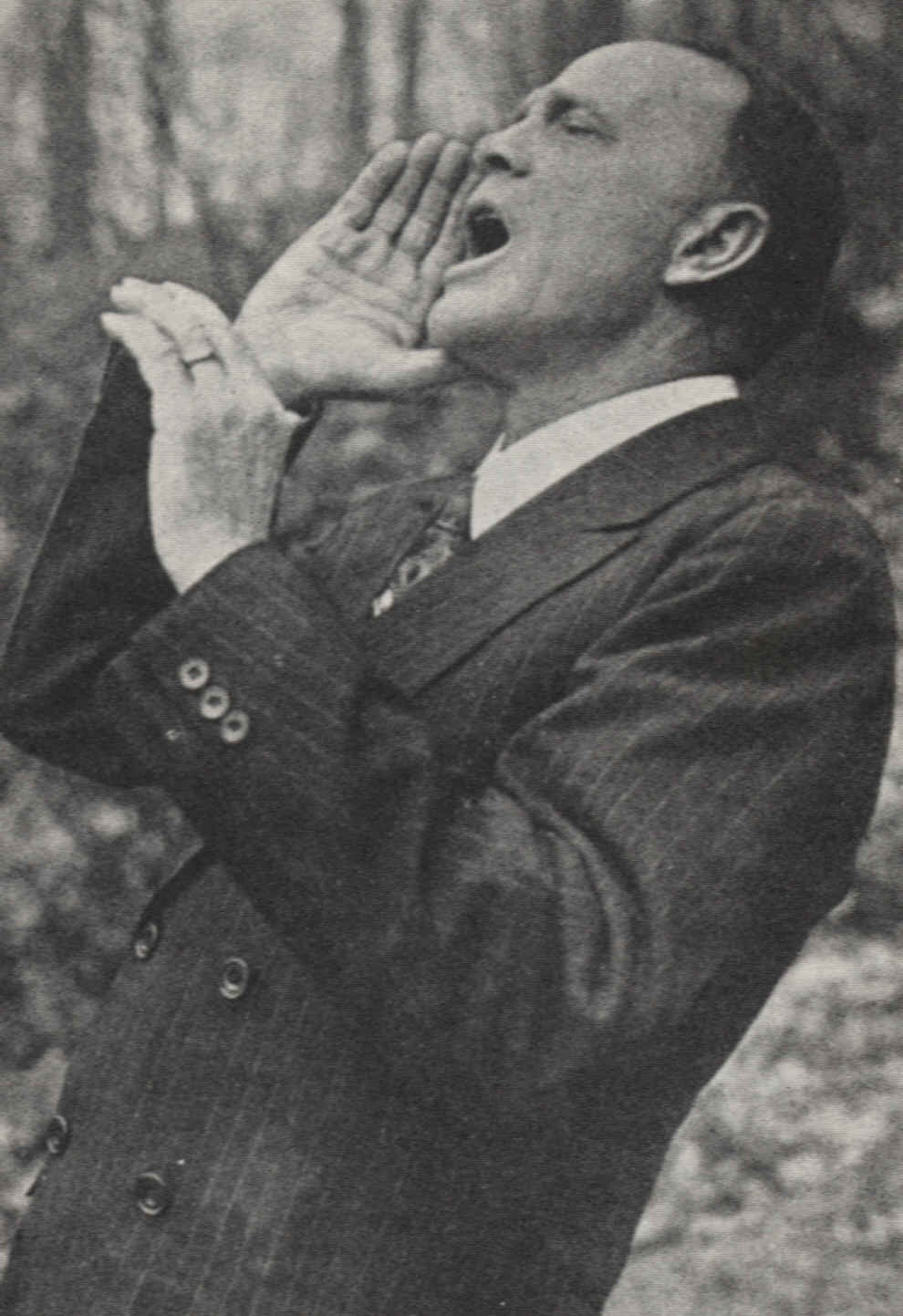
Sunday preaches

=== Kerosene circuit ===
When Chapman unexpectedly returned to the pastorate in 1896, Sunday struck out on his own, beginning with meetings in tiny Garner, Iowa. For the next twelve years Sunday preached in approximately seventy communities, most of them in Iowa and Illinois. Sunday referred to these towns as the "kerosene circuit" because, unlike Chicago, most were not yet electrified. Towns often booked Sunday meetings informally, sometimes by sending a delegation to hear him preach and then telegraphing him while he was holding services somewhere else.

Sunday also took advantage of his reputation as a baseball player to generate advertising for his meetings. In 1907 in Fairfield, Iowa, Sunday organized local businesses into two baseball teams and scheduled a game between them. Sunday came dressed in his professional uniform and played on both sides. Although baseball was his primary means of publicity, Sunday also once hired a circus giant to serve as an usher.

When Sunday began to attract crowds larger than could be accommodated in rural churches or town halls, he pitched rented canvas tents. Again, Sunday did much of the physical work of putting them up, manipulating ropes during storms, and seeing to their security by sleeping in them at night. Not until 1905 was he well-off enough to hire his own advance man.

In 1906, an October snowstorm in Salida, Colorado, destroyed Sunday's tent – a special disaster because revivalists were typically paid with a freewill offering at the end of their meetings. Thereafter he insisted that towns build him temporary wooden tabernacles at their expense. The tabernacles were comparatively costly to build (although most of the lumber could be salvaged and resold at the end of the meetings), and locals had to put up the money for them in advance. This change in Sunday's operation began to push the finances of the campaign to the fore. At least at first, raising tabernacles provided good public relations for the coming meetings as townspeople joined in what was effectively a giant barnraising. Sunday built rapport by participating in the process, and the tabernacles were also a status symbol, because they had previously been built only for major evangelists such as Chapman.

=== Under the administration of Nell ===
Eleven years into Sunday's evangelistic career, both he and his wife had been pushed to their emotional limits. Long separations had exacerbated his natural feelings of inadequacy and insecurity. Sunday depended on his wife's love and encouragement. For her part, Nell found it increasingly difficult to handle household responsibilities, the needs of four children (including a newborn), and the long-distance emotional welfare of her husband. His ministry was also expanding, and he needed an administrator. In 1908, the Sundays decided to entrust their children to a nanny so that Nell could manage the revival campaigns.

Nell Sunday transformed her husband's out-of-the-back-pocket organization into a "nationally renowned phenomenon." New personnel were hired, and by the New York campaign of 1917, the Sundays had a paid staff of twenty-six. There were musicians, custodians, and advance men; but the Sundays also hired Bible teachers of both genders, who among other responsibilities, held daytime meetings at schools and shops and encouraged their audiences to attend the main tabernacle services in the evenings. The most significant of these new staff members were Homer Rodeheaver, an exceptional song leader and music director who worked with the Sundays for almost twenty years beginning in 1910, and Virginia Healey Asher, who (besides regularly singing duets with Rodeheaver) directed the women's ministries, especially the evangelization of young working women.

=== Campaign platform ===
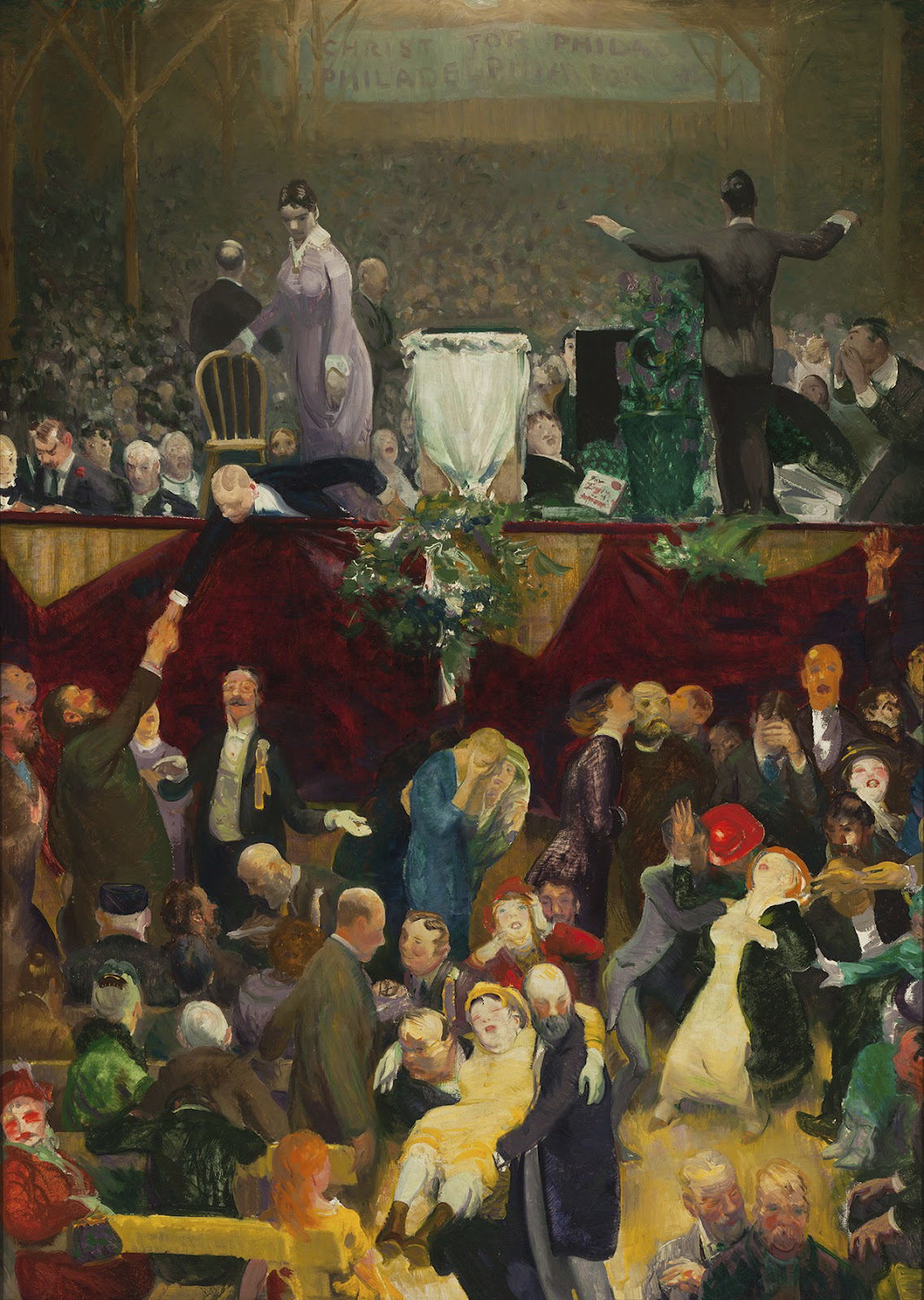
Billy Sunday preaching in 1915 in a temporary tabernacle erected on the site of the future Parkway Central Library of Philadelphia. Painting by George Bellows, based on his illustrations for Metropolitan Magazine

With his wife administering the campaign organization, Sunday was free to compose and deliver colloquial sermons. Typically, Homer Rodeheaver would first warm up the crowd with congregational singing that alternated with numbers from gigantic choirs and music performed by the staff. When Sunday felt the moment right, he would launch into his message. Sunday gyrated, stood on the pulpit, ran from one end of the platform to the other, and dove across the stage, pretending to slide into home plate. Sometimes he even smashed chairs to emphasize his points. His sermon notes had to be printed in large letters so that he could catch a glimpse of them as he raced by the pulpit. In messages attacking sexual sin to groups of men only, Sunday could be graphic for the era.

A theological opponent, Universalist minister Frederick William Betts, wrote:

Many of the things said and done bordered upon things prohibited in decent society. The sermon on amusements was preached three times, to mixed audience of men and women, boys and girls. If the sermons to women had been preached to married women, if the sermons to men had been preached to mature men, if the sermon on amusements had been preached to grown folks, there might have been an excuse for them, and perhaps good from them. But an experienced newspaper reporter told me that the sermon on amusements was "the rawest thing ever put over in Syracuse." I can not, must not, quote from this sermon....[a friend] says that Mr. Sunday's sermon on the sex question was raw and disgusting. He also heard the famous sermons on amusements and booze. [He] says that all in all they were the ugliest, nastiest, most disgusting addresses he ever listened to from a religious platform or a preacher of religion. He saw people carried out who had fainted under that awful definition of sensuality and depravity.

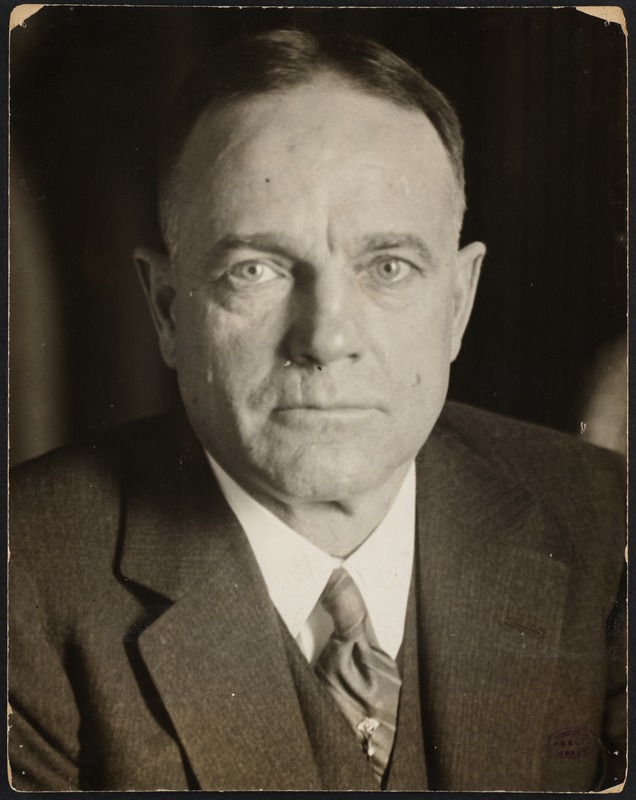
Billy Sunday, Evangelist and Baseball Player, [ca. 1910]. Michael T. "Nuf Ced" McGreevy Collection, Boston Public Library

Homer Rodeheaver said that "One of these sermons, until he tempered it down a little, had one ten-minute period in it where from two to twelve men fainted and had to be carried out every time I heard him preach it." Some religious and social leaders criticized Sunday's exaggerated gestures as well as the slang and colloquialisms that filled his sermons, but audiences clearly enjoyed them.

In 1907, journalist Lindsay Denison complained that Sunday preached "the old, old doctrine of damnation". Denison wrote, "In spite of his conviction that the truly religious man should take his religion joyfully, he gets his results by inspiring fear and gloom in the hearts of sinners. The fear of death, with torment beyond it—intensified by examples of the frightful deathbeds of those who have carelessly or obdurately put off salvation until it is too late—it is with this mighty menace that he drives sinners into the fold." However, Sunday himself told reporters "with ill-concealed annoyance" that his revivals had "no emotionalism." Caricatures compared him to the extravagances of mid-nineteenth-century camp meetings, as in the famous drawing "Billy Sunday" by George Bellows. Sunday told one reporter that he believed that people could "be converted without any fuss," and, at Sunday's meetings, "instances of spasm, shakes, or fainting fits caused by hysteria were few and far between."

Crowd noise, especially coughing and crying babies, was a significant impediment to Sunday's preaching because the wooden tabernacles were so acoustically live. During his preliminaries, Rodeheaver often instructed audiences about how to muffle their coughs. Nurseries were always provided, infants forbidden, and Sunday sometimes appeared rude in his haste to rid the hall of noisy children who had slipped through the ushers.

Tabernacle floors were covered with sawdust to dampen the noise of shuffling feet (as well as for its pleasant smell and its ability to hold down the dust of dirt floors), and walking to the front at the preacher's invitation became known as "hitting the sawdust trail." The term was first used in a Sunday campaign in Bellingham, Washington, in 1910. Apparently, "hitting the sawdust trail" had first been used by loggers in the Pacific Northwest to describe following home a trail of previously dropped sawdust through an uncut forest — described by Nell Sunday as a metaphor for coming from "a lost condition to a saved condition."

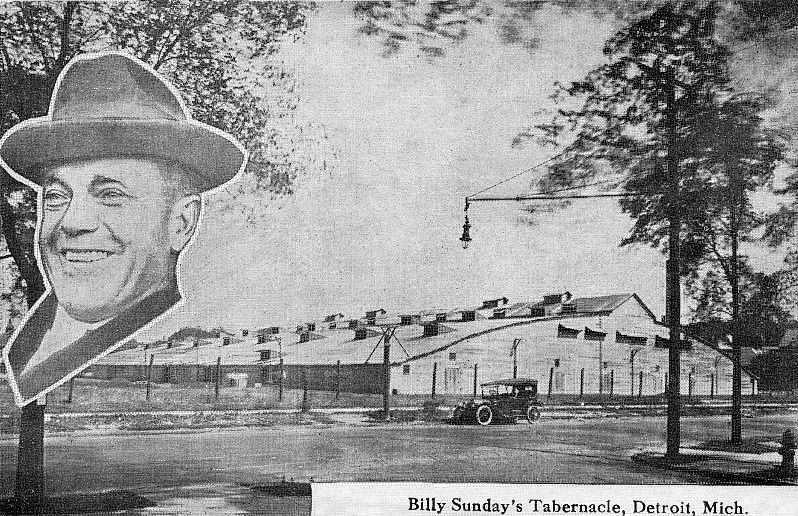
Billy Sunday's tabernacle (Detroit 1916)

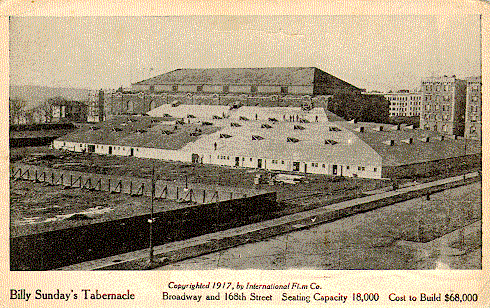
New York City Tabernacle, 1917

By 1910, Sunday began to conduct meetings (usually longer than a month) in small cities like Youngstown, Wilkes-Barre, South Bend, and Denver, and then finally, between 1915 and 1917, the major cities of Philadelphia, Syracuse, Kansas City, Detroit, Boston, Buffalo, and New York City. During the 1910s, Sunday was front-page news in the cities where he held campaigns. Newspapers often printed his sermons in full, and during World War I, local coverage of his campaigns often surpassed that of the war. Sunday was the subject of over sixty articles in major periodicals, and he was a staple of the religious press regardless of denomination.

Over the course of his career, Sunday probably preached to more than one hundred million people face-to-face—and, to the great majority, without electronic amplification. Vast numbers "hit the sawdust trail." Although the usual total given for those who came forward at invitations is an even million, one modern historian estimates the true figure to be closer to 1,250,000. Sunday did not preach to a hundred million different individuals but to many of the same people repeatedly over the course of a campaign. Before his death, Sunday estimated that he had preached nearly 20,000 sermons, an average of 42 per month from 1896 to 1935. During his heyday, when he was preaching more than twenty times each week, his crowds were often huge. Even in 1923, well into the period of his decline, 479,300 people attended the 79 meetings of the six-week 1923 Columbia, South Carolina, campaign – 23 times the white population of Columbia. Nevertheless,"trail hitters" were not necessarily conversions (or even "reconsecrations") to Christianity. Sometimes whole groups of club members came forward en masse at Sunday's prodding. By 1927, Rodeheaver was complaining that invitations had become so general that they were meaningless.

=== Wages of success ===
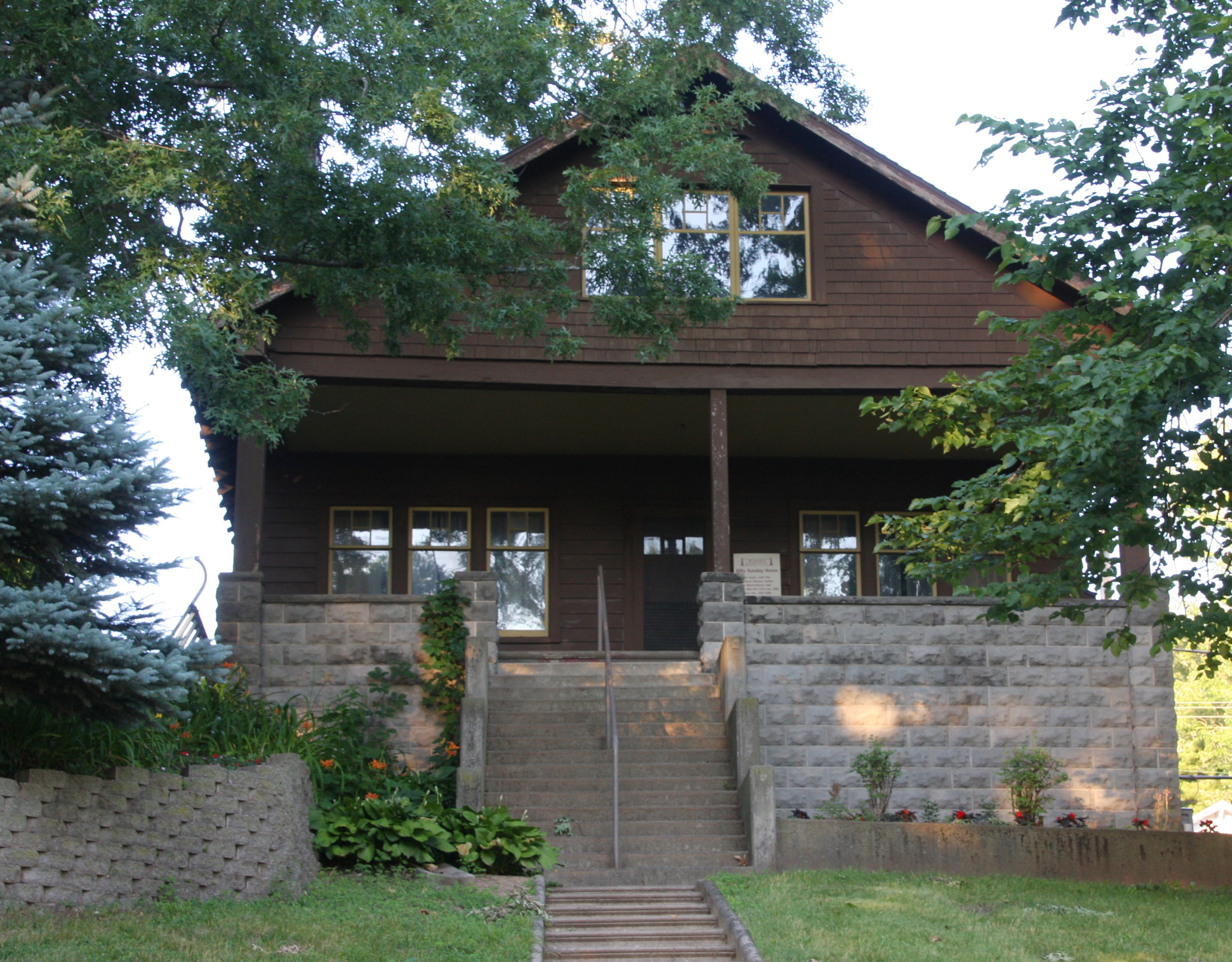
1911 bungalow in Winona Lake, Indiana

Large crowds and an efficient organization meant that Sunday was soon netting hefty offerings. The first questions about Sunday's income were apparently raised during the Columbus, Ohio, campaign at the turn of 1912–13. During the Pittsburgh campaign a year later, Sunday spoke four times per day and effectively made $217 per sermon or $870 a day at a time when the average gainfully employed worker made $836 per year. The major cities of Chicago, Philadelphia, Baltimore, Boston, and New York City gave Sunday even larger offerings. Sunday donated Chicago's offering of $58,000 to Pacific Garden Mission and the $120,500 New York offering to war charities. Nevertheless, between 1908 and 1920, the Sundays earned over a million dollars; an average worker during the same period earned less than $14,000.

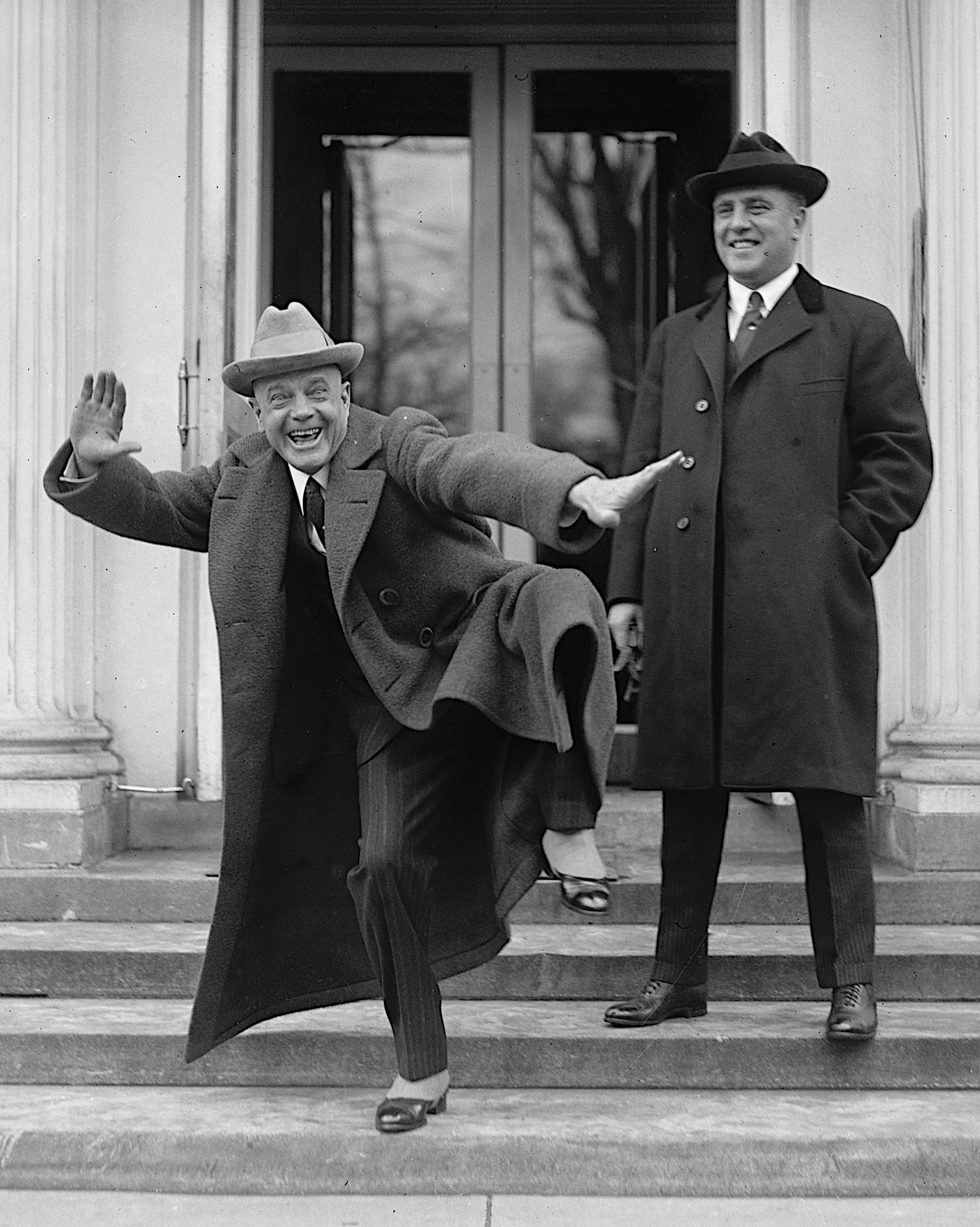
Billy Sunday at the White House, 1922

Sunday was welcomed into the circle of the social, economic, and political elite. He counted among his neighbors and acquaintances several prominent businessmen. Sunday dined with numerous politicians, including Presidents Theodore Roosevelt and Woodrow Wilson, and counted both Herbert Hoover and John D. Rockefeller Jr. as friends. During and after the 1917 Los Angeles campaign, the Sundays visited with Hollywood stars, and members of Sunday's organization played a charity baseball game against a team of show business personalities that included Douglas Fairbanks, Sr.

The Sundays enjoyed dressing well and dressing their children well; the family sported expensive but tasteful coats, boots, and jewelry. Nell Sunday also bought land as an investment. In 1909, the Sundays bought an apple orchard in Hood River, Oregon, where they vacationed for several years. Although the property sported only a rustic cabin, reporters called it a "ranch". Sunday was a soft touch with money and gave away much of his earnings. Neither of the Sundays were extravagant spenders. Although Sunday enjoyed driving, the couple never owned a car. In 1911, the Sundays moved to Winona Lake, Indiana, and built an American Craftsman-style bungalow, which they called "Mount Hood", probably as a reminder of their Oregon vacation cabin. The bungalow, furnished in the popular Arts and Crafts style, had two porches and a terraced garden but only nine rooms, 2,500 square feet (230 m^{2}) of living space, and no garage.

== Religious views ==
Sunday was a conservative evangelical who accepted fundamentalist doctrines. He affirmed and preached the biblical inerrancy, the virgin birth of Jesus, the doctrine of substitutionary atonement, the bodily resurrection of Jesus, a literal devil and hell, and the imminent return of Jesus Christ. At the turn of the 20th century, most Protestant church members, regardless of denomination, gave assent to these doctrines. Sunday refused to hold meetings in cities where he was not welcomed by the vast majority of the Protestant churches and their clergy.

Sunday was not a separationist as were many Protestants of his era. He went out of his way to avoid criticizing the Roman Catholic Church and even met with Cardinal Gibbons during his 1916 Baltimore campaign. Also, cards filled out by "trail hitters" were faithfully returned to the church or denomination that the writers had indicated as their choice, including Catholic and Unitarian.

Although Sunday was ordained by the Presbyterian Church in 1903, his ministry was nondenominational and he was not a strict Calvinist. He preached that individuals were, at least in part, responsible for their own salvation. "Trail hitters" were given a four-page tract that stated, "if you have done your part (i.e. believe that Christ died in your place, and receive Him as your Saviour and Master) God has done HIS part and imparted to you His own nature."

Sunday never attended seminary and made no pretense of being a theologian or an intellectual, but he had a thorough knowledge of the Bible and was well read on religious and social issues of his day. His surviving Winona Lake library of six hundred books gives evidence of heavy use, including underscoring and reader's notes in his characteristic all-caps printing. Some of Sunday's books were even those of religious opponents. He was once charged with plagiarizing a Decoration Day speech given by the noted agnostic Robert Ingersoll.

Sunday's homespun preaching had a wide appeal to his audiences, who were "entertained, reproached, exhorted, and astonished." Sunday claimed to be "an old-fashioned preacher of the old-time religion" and his uncomplicated sermons spoke of a personal God, salvation through Jesus Christ, and following the moral lessons of the Bible. Sunday's theology, although sometimes denigrated as simplistic, was situated within the mainstream Protestantism of his time.

== Social and political views ==
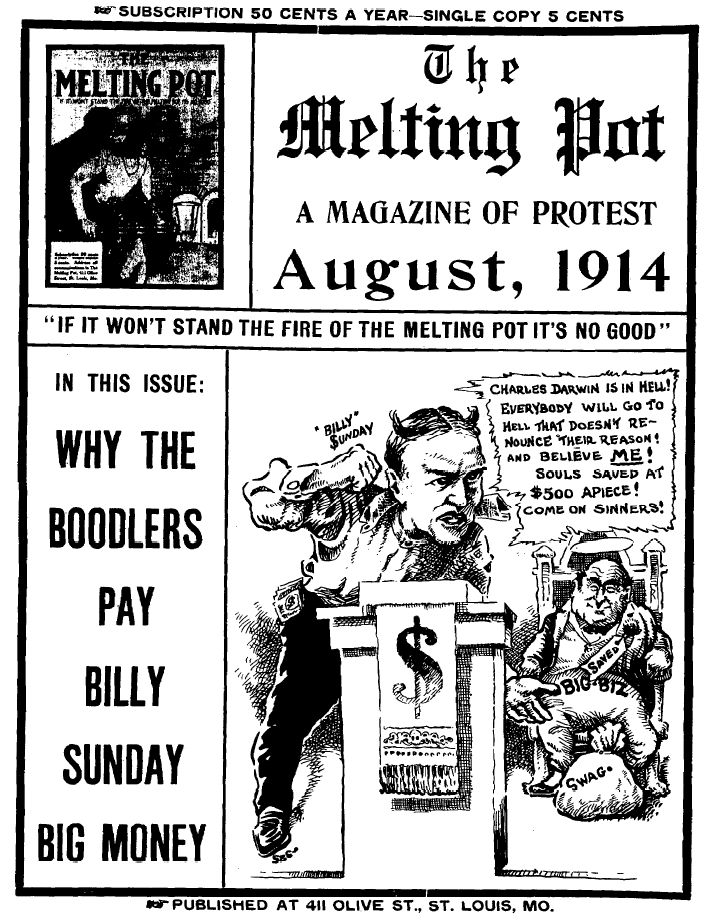
Cover of August 1914 issue of The Melting Pot: A Magazine of Protest, edited by Henry M. Tichenor, condemning Sunday as a tool of big business.

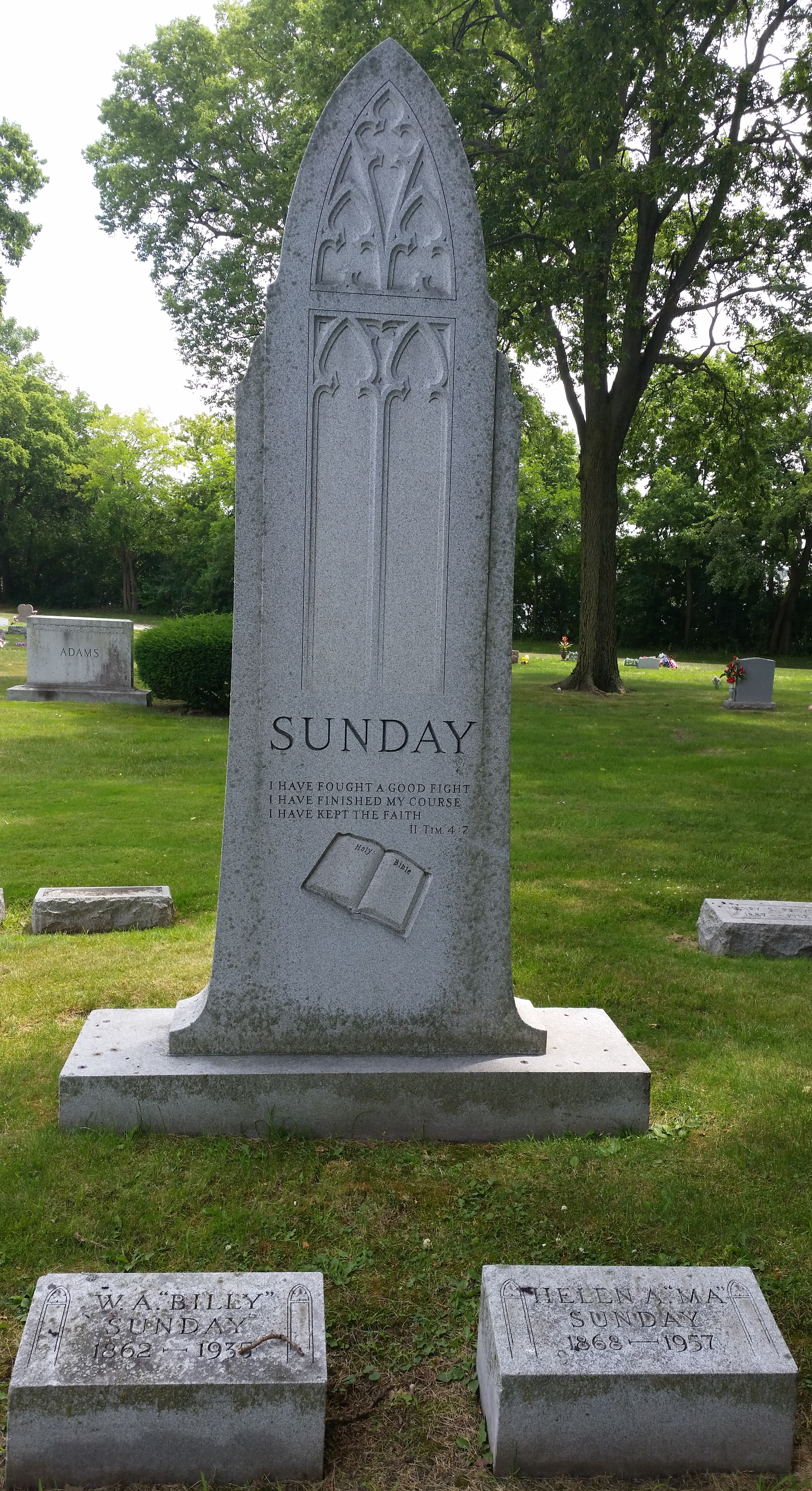
Tombstones of Billy and Helen Sunday, Forest Home Cemetery, Forest Park, Illinois

Sunday was a lifelong Republican, and he espoused the mainstream political and social views of his native Midwest: individualism, competitiveness, personal discipline, and opposition to government regulation. Writers such as Sinclair Lewis, Henry M. Tichenor, and John Reed attacked Sunday as a tool of big business, and poet Carl Sandburg called him a "four-flusher" and a "bunkshooter". Nevertheless, Sunday sided with Progressives on some issues. For example, he denounced child labor and supported urban reform and women's suffrage. Sunday condemned capitalists "whose private lives are good, but whose public lives are very bad", as well as those "who would not pick the pockets of one man with the fingers of their hand" but who would "without hesitation pick the pockets of eighty million people with fingers of their monopoly or commercial advantage." Sunday expressed sympathy for the poor and tried to bridge the gulf between the races during the zenith of the Jim Crow era.

However, Sunday regularly received contributions from members of the Second Ku Klux Klan during the 1920s. In another instance, in 1927, in Bangor, Maine, Sunday's partner and music director, Homer Rodeheaver, told Klansmen who briefly interrupted the service that "he did not believe that any organization that marched behind the Cross of Christ and the American Flag could be anything but a power for good." Sunday himself praised Klansmen who assisted the police in vice raids.

Another exception to his support for progressive causes, is his comment on striking coal miners who were involved in United Mine Workers organizing in West Virginia in the 1920s. Hired by coal operators in the aftermath of the Battle of Blair Mountain, Sunday referred to the miners as "human lice". The Logan County battle was the largest labor uprising in American history.

Sunday was a passionate supporter of America entering World War I. In 1918 he said, "I tell you it is [Kaiser] Bill against Woodrow, Germany against America, Hell against Heaven." Sunday raised large amounts of money for the troops, sold war bonds, and stumped for recruitment.

Sunday had been an ardent champion of temperance from his earliest days as an evangelist, and his ministry at the Chicago YMCA had given him first-hand experience with the destructive potential of alcohol. Sunday's most famous sermon was "Get on the Water Wagon", which he preached on countless occasions with both histrionic emotion and a "mountain of economic and moral evidence". Sunday said, "I am the sworn, eternal and uncompromising enemy of the Liquor Traffic. I have been, and will go on, fighting that damnable, dirty, rotten business with all the power at my command." Sunday played a significant role in arousing public interest in Prohibition and in the passage of the Eighteenth Amendment in 1919. When the tide of public opinion turned against Prohibition, he continued to support it. After its repeal in 1933, Sunday called for its reintroduction.

Sunday also opposed eugenics, recent immigration from southern and eastern Europe, and the teaching of evolution. Further, he criticized such popular middle-class amusements as dancing, playing cards, attending the theater, and reading novels. However, he believed baseball was a healthy and even patriotic form of recreation, so long as it was not played on Sundays.

== Decline and death ==
Sunday's popularity waned after World War I, when many people in his revival audiences were attracted to radio broadcasts and moving pictures instead. The Sundays' health also declined even as they continued to drive themselves through rounds of revivals—smaller but also with fewer staff members to assist them.

Tragedy marred Sunday's final years. His three sons engaged in many of the activities he preached against, and the Sundays paid blackmail to several women to keep the scandals relatively quiet. In 1930, Nora Lynn, their housekeeper and nanny, who had become a virtual member of the family, died. Then the Sundays' daughter, the only child actually raised by Nell, died in 1932 of what seems to have been multiple sclerosis. Their oldest son George, rescued from financial ruin by his parents, committed suicide in 1933.

Nevertheless, even as the crowds declined during the last 15 years of his life, Sunday continued accepting preaching invitations and speaking with effect. In early 1935, he had a mild heart attack, and his doctor advised him to stay out of the pulpit. Sunday ignored the advice. He died on November 6, a week after preaching his last sermon on the text "What must I do to be saved?"
