= Sawdust trail =

Temporary buildings used for revival meetings

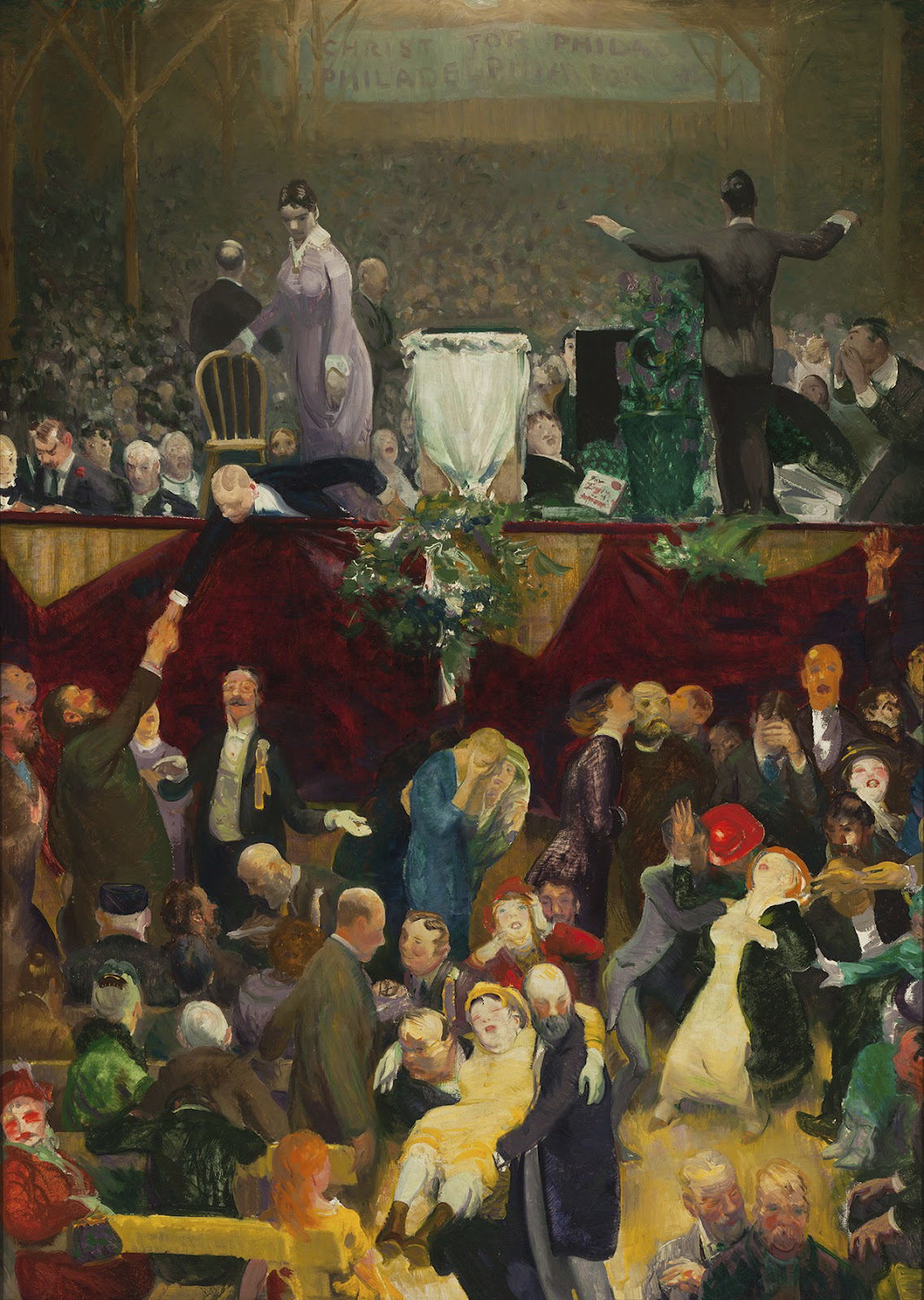
George Bellows, The Sawdust Trail (1916). The painting depicts a meeting led by Billy Sunday and his wife Helen in Philadelphia in 1915.

The sawdust trail or the sawdust circuit consisted of a series of temporary buildings or tents used by itinerant ministers for revival meetings. Tabernacle floors were covered with sawdust to damp the noise of shuffling feet (as well as for its pleasant smell and its ability to hold down the dust of dirt floors), and coming forward during the invitation became known as "hitting the sawdust trail."

Billy Sunday repeatedly used the metaphor throughout his career. He told his audiences to "hit the sawdust trail" and give their lives to Jesus. At his revival meetings, "trail hitters" would walk up the center aisle strewn with sawdust and shake Sunday's hand as a public manifestation of their conversion experience.

== See also ==
- Chitlin' Circuit
- Borscht Belt
