= 1932 Illinois gubernatorial election =

- November 8, 1932
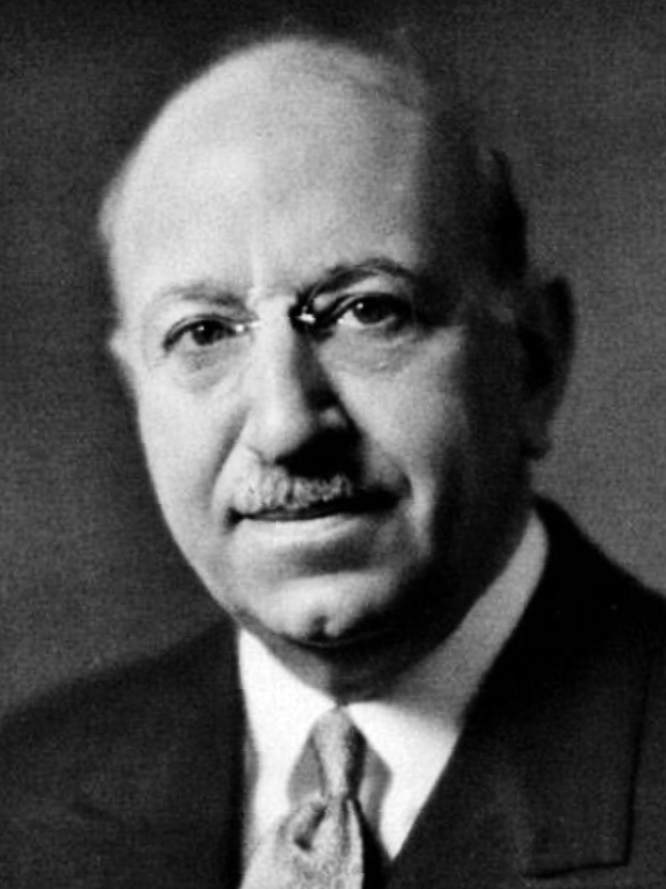

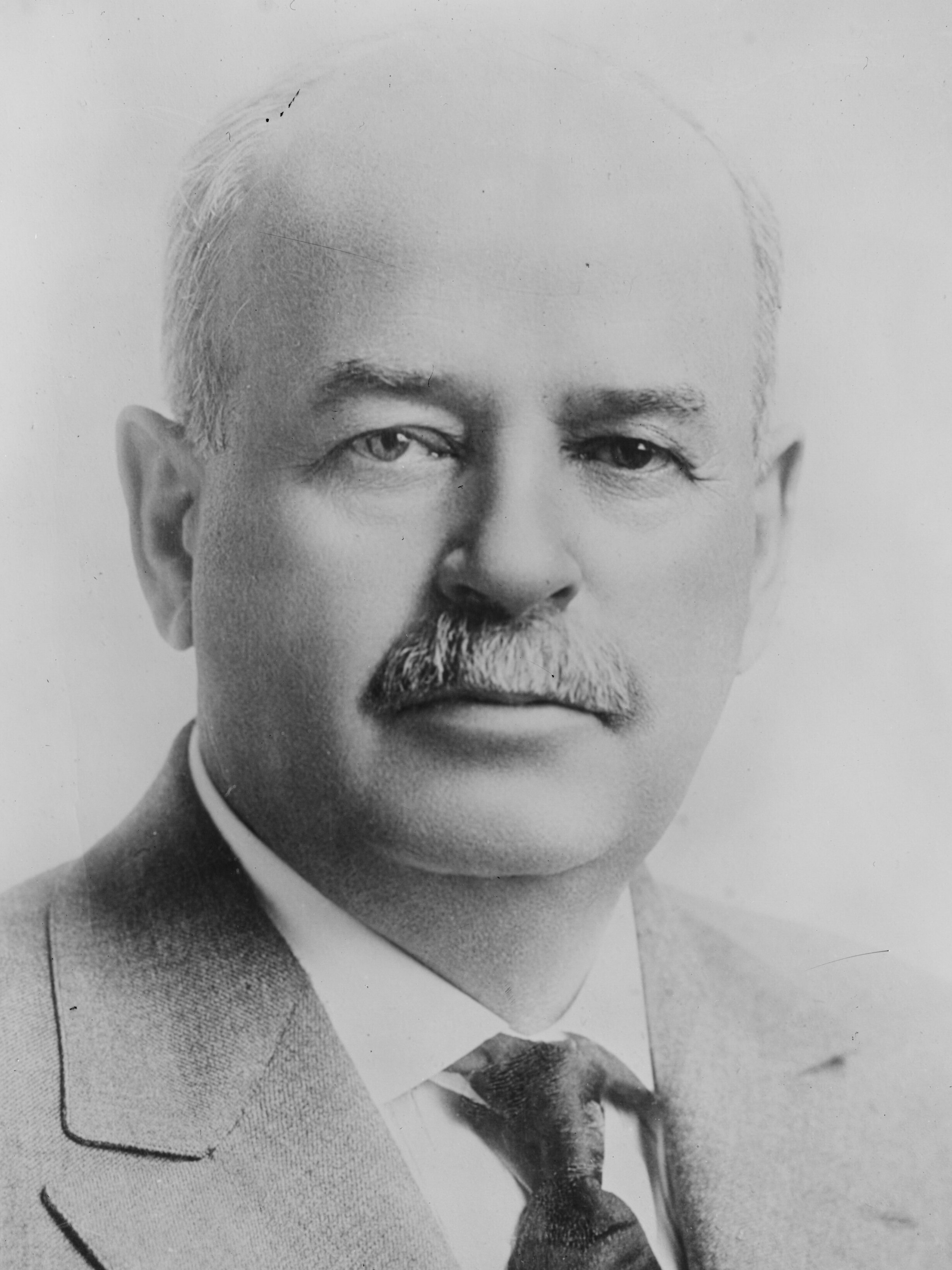
Nominee	Henry Horner	Len Small
Party	Democratic	Republican
Popular vote	1,930,330	1,364,043
Percentage	57.62%	40.71%
- County results Horner: 40–50% 50–60% 60–70% Small: 50–60% 60–70%
Governor before election
Louis Lincoln Emmerson
Republican
Elected Governor
Henry Horner
Democratic

The 1932 Illinois gubernatorial election was held on November 8, 1932. Democratic nominee Henry Horner defeated Republican nominee and former Governor Len Small with 57.62% of the vote.

Incumbent first-term Republican Governor Louis Lincoln Emmerson did not run for re-election.

== Primary elections ==
Primary elections were held on April 12, 1932.

=== Democratic primary ===
==== Candidates ====
- Joseph L. Burke
- Bruce A. Campbell, former State Representative
- R. S. Douglas
- Leo Patrick Dwyer
- Oliver Wendell Holmes
- Henry Horner, judge
- Michael L. Igoe, member of the board of South Park Commissioners
- Andrew W. Sullivan

==== Results ====
Democratic primary results
Party	Candidate	Votes	%
Democratic	Henry Horner	397,499	48.67
Democratic	Michael L. Igoe	255,527	31.28
Democratic	Bruce A. Campbell	134,972	16.53
Democratic	Oliver Wendell Holmes	8,138	1.00
Democratic	Joseph L. Burke	6,375	0.78
Democratic	Andrew W. Sullivan	6,334	0.77
Democratic	R. S. Douglas	4,289	0.52
Democratic	Leo Patrick Dwyer	3,639	0.45
Total votes		816,773	100.00

=== Republican primary ===
==== Candidates ====
- Edward J. Brundage, former Attorney General of Illinois
- Oscar E. Carlstrom, incumbent Attorney General of Illinois
- Herbert E. Clayton
- Omer N. Custer, former Treasurer of Illinois
- J. Edward Jones
- William H. Malone, former chairman of the Illinois Tax Commission
- Willard A. Maxwell
- Len Small, former Governor

==== Endorsements ====
Omer N. Custer

Statewide officials

- Louis Lincoln Emmerson, incumbent Governor of Illinois

==== Results ====
Republican primary results
Party	Candidate	Votes	%
Republican	Len Small	481,960	36.64
Republican	Omer N. Custer	370,301	28.15
Republican	Oscar E. Carlstrom	282,741	21.50
Republican	William H. Malone	116,838	8.88
Republican	Edward J. Brundage	38,449	2.92
Republican	Willard A. Maxwell	13,413	1.02
Republican	Herbert E. Clayton	6,259	0.48
Republican	J. Edward Jones	5,284	0.40
Total votes		1,315,245	100.00

== General election ==
=== Major candidates ===
- Henry Horner, Democratic
- Len Small, Republican

=== Minor candidates ===
- Leondies McDonald, Communist
- W. W. O'Brien, Independent
- Roy E. Burt, Socialist, member of the board of education of the Methodist Episcopal Church
- J. E. Procum, Socialist Labor, nominee for Governor in 1928

=== Post-primary endorsements ===
Henry Horner

Statewide officials

- Louis Lincoln Emmerson, incumbent Governor of Illinois (Republican)

=== Results ===
1932 Illinois gubernatorial election
Party	Candidate	Votes	%	±%
Democratic	Henry Horner	1,930,330	57.62%	
Republican	Len Small	1,364,043	40.71%	
Socialist	Roy E. Burt	39,389	1.18%	
Communist	Leondies McDonald	12,466	0.37%	
Socialist Labor	J. E. Procum	2,896	0.09%	
Independent	W. W. O'Brien	1,182	0.03%	
	Scattering	14	0.00%	
Majority		566,287	16.90%	
Turnout		3,350,320	100.00%	
Democratic gain from Republican		Swing		

== See also ==
- 1932 Illinois lieutenant gubernatorial election

== Bibliography ==
- Glashan, Roy R. (1979). American Governors and Gubernatorial Elections, 1775-1978. Meckler Books. ISBN 0-930466-17-9.
- Samuel K. Gove, ed. (1959). Illinois Votes 1900-1958: A Compilation of Illinois Election Statistics. Urbana-Champaign, Illinois: University of Illinois.
- Compiled by William J. Stratton, Secretary of State (1932). Official vote of the State of Illinois cast at the General Election, Nov. 8, 1932; Judicial Elections, 1931-1932; Primary Elections: General Primary, April 12, 1932, Presidential Preference, April 12, 1932. Springfield, Illinois: Journal Printing Company.
