= Travers Clement =

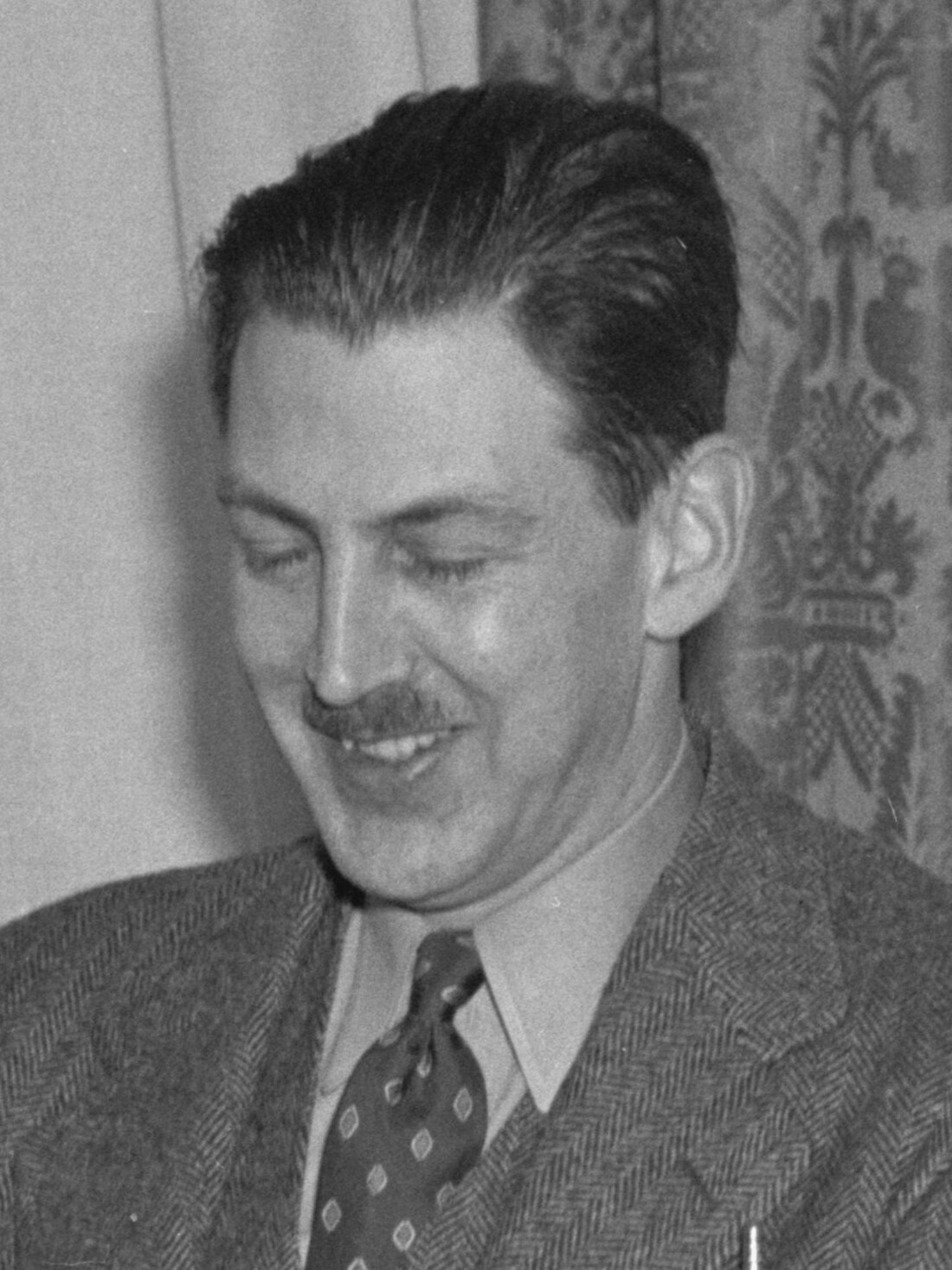
Clement in 1940

Travers Clement (c. 1900 – May 4, 1977) was an American socialist writer, politician, and political functionary. He is best remembered as an assistant to Angelica Balabanoff in the writing of her memoirs and for his tenure as the National Executive Secretary of the Socialist Party of America from 1939 to 1942.

== Biography ==
=== Early years ===
Travers Clement was born around 1900 and lived in Los Gatos, California during the 1930s, where he was an active member of the Socialist Party of California and the Newspaper Guild.

=== Political career ===
In 1928, Clement was named the national publicity director of the American Civil Liberties Union (ACLU), a position which he retained through 1929. In that year, he became secretary of the National Mooney-Billings Committee. He remained an active member of the executive board of the ACLU's local committee in San Francisco.

Clement was the author of several pamphlets for the ACLU, as well as material dealing with the Mooney-Billings case and the Maritime Union. He was also a periodic contributor to The New Republic magazine.

Clement was elected to the governing National Executive Committee of the Socialist Party at the April 1938 convention of the organization held in Kenosha, Wisconsin. When Executive Secretary Roy E. Burt resigned early in April 1939, the NEC named Clement as the new head of day-to-day operations of the organization.
