= A.M. Stirton =

American politician

A. M. Stirton (1872–1939) was an American politician who participated in political activity as a member of the Socialist Party of America and the Industrial Workers of the World. Stirton eventually shifted his views away from electoral politics and advocated "direct action" in the industrial sector.

== Socialist Party ==
Stirton was a delegate to the 1908 convention of the Socialist Party of America held in Chicago, Illinois where he was one of two delegates representing the state of Michigan. That same year, he was a Socialist candidate for governor in Michigan, gaining 1.74% of the vote. Along with his campaign in Michigan, he toured the Midwest with Socialist Party presidential candidate Eugene Debs. He also was a candidate for the Michigan State Board of Education in 1909.

During this period, Stirton was based in Hancock, Michigan and edited a socialist newspaper titled The Wage Slave. The Wage Slave was described in an advertisement as "revolutionary to the core" and "the enemy of everything that supports the existing order." The publication had national recognition and gave Stirton a role in national Socialist politics. The Wage Slave was published by the Työmies Publishing Company.

== Turn away from electoral politics ==
By 1909, Stirton had turned away from electoral politics, believing instead that workers must engage in industrial action along syndicalist lines to achieve liberation. This change in views brought Stirton into the Industrial Workers of the World (IWW) where he organized in the 1910s.

With the Industrial Workers of the World, Stirton was an active organizer. He edited the IWW newspaper Solidarity for a brief period in 1909. Following that period, Stirton moved to Grand Rapids, Michigan where he organized with Industrial Workers of the World Local 202. Stirton was a frequent IWW lecturer in Grand Rapids.

A.M. Stirton also authored the IWW pamphlet "Getting Recognition: What It Means to a Union" that was published and distributed by the national organization. The pamphlet was critical of official union recognition.
