= Emil Herman =

American activist (1879–1928)

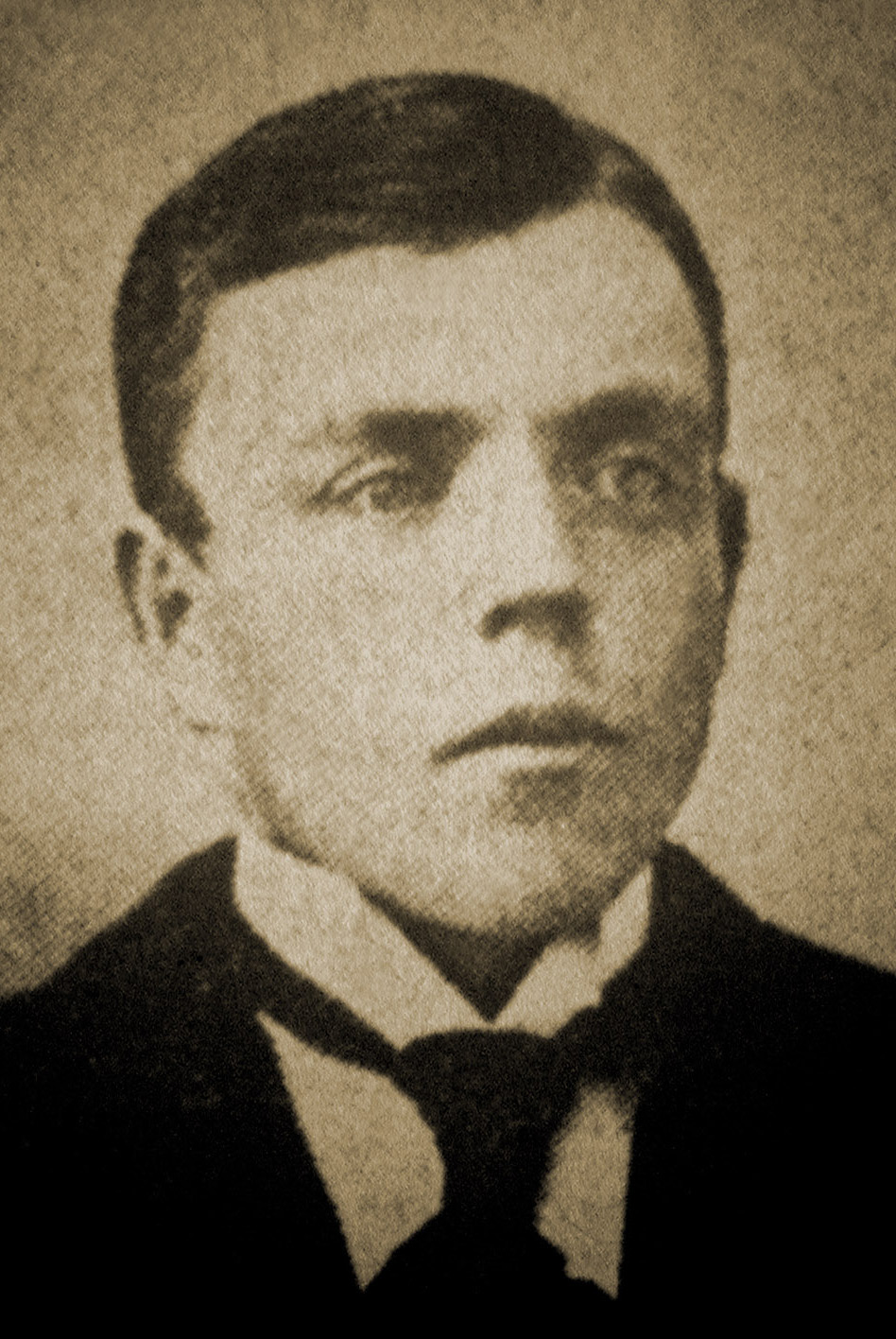
Emil Herman as he appeared in a 1904 photograph in Hermon Titus's newspaper, The Socialist.

Emil M. Herman (1879–1928) was a German-American socialist and anti-war activist. A three-time candidate for Congress on the ticket of the Socialist Party of America, Herman is best remembered for his imprisonment by the Wilson administration due to his political activity in the outspokenly anti-war Socialist Party of America during World War I.

== Biography ==
=== Early years ===
Emil M. Herman was born August 22, 1879, in the Austro-Hungarian Empire town of Kamnitz (now part of the Czech Republic), the son of a farmer of ethnic German extraction. The family emigrated to the United States in 1882, settling first in Alexander, Arkansas before moving to Kansas City, Missouri, where Emil attended grammar school. Herman's education came to an abrupt end at an early age, however, as he was forced by economic circumstances to drop out of school to go to work to help support the family at age 11.

Herman moved to Washington state in 1890, setting near Lyman, Washington. He worked variously as a lumberman, a farmer, and a baker. In 1922 he became a member of the Bakers Union.

=== Political career ===
Herman joined the Socialist Labor Party (SLP) in 1897 and was a member of Section Woolley, Washington. He remained with the SLP until 1899, when he exited to join instead the Social Democratic Party of America (SDP) headed by Eugene V. Debs and Victor L. Berger. Herman served as the local secretary of Local Lyman] on behalf of his new organization.

When the SDP united with Slobodin and Hillquit's East Coast-based group of former SLP members in 1901 to form the Socialist Party of America (SPA), Herman continued his political activity in that new organization as well. First serving as a local secretary, Herman was first elected as a delegate to the Socialist Party's national convention in 1908. He was also chosen in that capacity to attend the party's conventions of 1917, 1923, and 1924.

Herman's first run for political office came in the spring of 1904, when he ran for Seattle City Council on the Socialist Party ticket. He later ran as a Socialist candidate for U.S. Congress in 1906, 1908, and 1909.

Herman was elected State Secretary of the Socialist Party of Washington in 1916, continuing in that role until 1918. In this capacity, he served as editor of the state SP's official newspaper, Party Builder. He was also elected to the governing 15 member National Executive Committee of the Socialist Party of America in 1917, with his term expiring in 1919.

Herman was a dual member of the Industrial Workers of the World from 1910 through the early 1920s.

On April 30, 1918, Herman was arrested at the Everett, Washington office of the state Socialist Party under the Espionage Act of 1917. He was held pending $20,000 bond, which was eventually provided. While out on bond, Herman was rearrested and his bond was revoked for traveling to Chicago to attend an organizational conference of the IWW.

At trial the prosecution produced its evidence against Herman seized in the raid on his office, including the pamphlets The Great Madness, Mental Dynamite, and The Menace of Militarism. Also shown to the jury were "disloyal" stickers with a quotation falsely attributed to Jack London reading:

"Young Man! The lowest aim in your life is to be a good soldier. The 'good soldier' never tries to distinguish right from wrong. He never thinks, never reasons; he only obeys.... A good soldier is a blind, heartless, murderous machine.... No man can fall lower than a soldier — it is a depth beneath which we cannot go. Young Man, Don't Be a Soldier, Be a Man."

In the wartime climate of superheated nationalism and anti-German sentiment, the German-American socialist organizer Herman was convicted under the Espionage Act of 1917 for possession of these "seditious" materials and sentenced to 10 years in prison.

While serving time at McNeil Island Federal Penitentiary in Washington state, Herman remained a member of the Socialist Party's governing National Executive Committee. He was sharply critical of the decision of the members of the NEC still at liberty to expel the Michigan state Socialist Party and to suspend various foreign language federations supportive of the organized faction known as the Left wing section, charging in a letter published in the party press that the NEC had acted without maintaining a quorum and engaged in "petty, political trickery" by invalidating the 1919 party election and making a major section of the party ineligible for participation in the forthcoming 1919 Emergency National Convention of the party.

Herman was pardoned and released on December 24, 1921, after having spent over 3 years and 4 months behind bars. He was unbowed by his prison experience, delivering a speech immediately after his release in which he declared:

"I am opposed to war. I object to bloodshed. I would not take the life of a human being to save my own. I regard human life as infinitely sacred. I am opposed, therefore to the system that ruthlessly sacrifices human life in the most barbarous manner possible.

"Sixty thousand of our boys lie beneath the Flanders poppies. For what? Did not Lloyd George just the other day make the assertion that Europe was worse off than ever? That there were more men under arms than before the war?

"The disarmament conference was a farce. To be true, they limit battleships, but laboratories in every country are occupied by those who work feverishly to perfect deadly and secret gas. The next war will be of airplanes and poison gas, and no one will be a non-combatant, not even the smallest infant."

Despite being courted by communists through the newly formed Workers Party of America amid his wartime imprisonment, upon his release Herman rejoined the Socialist Party. At the time of his reaffiliation to the SPA, Herman declared in a published article that the Communists had "swallowed hook, bait, and line of the programs imposed upon them" by "agents of the Department of Justice," and thus been driven underground.

Herman again opened up an office in Everett, where he served as the secretary for the Northwest District for the now-atrophied Socialist Party in the years after his release.

=== Death and legacy ===
Emil Herman died October 10, 1928.

Emil Herman's wife, Ruby Herman (1885-?), was an activist in the Socialist Party and continued her husband's work as the party's secretary for the Pacific Northwest region for some time after her husband's death. A native of Arkansas, she ran for Congress as a Socialist in 1924 and 1928.

The Hermans had two children, Donald R. Herman (born about 1915) and Edwin A. Herman (born about 1922).

== Works ==
- "Imprisoned Member Protests NEC Action," The New Age [Buffalo, NY], v. 7, no. 369 (June 26, 1919), pg. 7.
- "Where I Stand — And Why," Miami Valley Socialist [Dayton, OH], vol. 10, no. 526 (April 7, 1922), pg. 3.
- "Forward to Independent Political Action," The Socialist World [Chicago], vol. 4, no. 1 (January 1923), pp. 10–11.
- "An Unconsidered Phase of the Amnesty Question," The Socialist World [Chicago], vol. 4, no. 4 (April 1923), pp. 3–4.
- "Free Speech in Montana," The Socialist World [Chicago], vol. 4, no. 8 (August 1923), pp. 6–8.
- "Political Situation in the Northwest," The Socialist World [Chicago], vol. 4, no. 10 (October 1923), pp. 4–6.
- "Communist Party Pays Farmer-Labor Convention Expenses," The Socialist World [Chicago], vol. 4, no. 12 (December 1923), pp. 6–7.

== See also ==
- Socialist Party of Washington
