= Henry M. Tichenor =

American journalist (1858–1922)

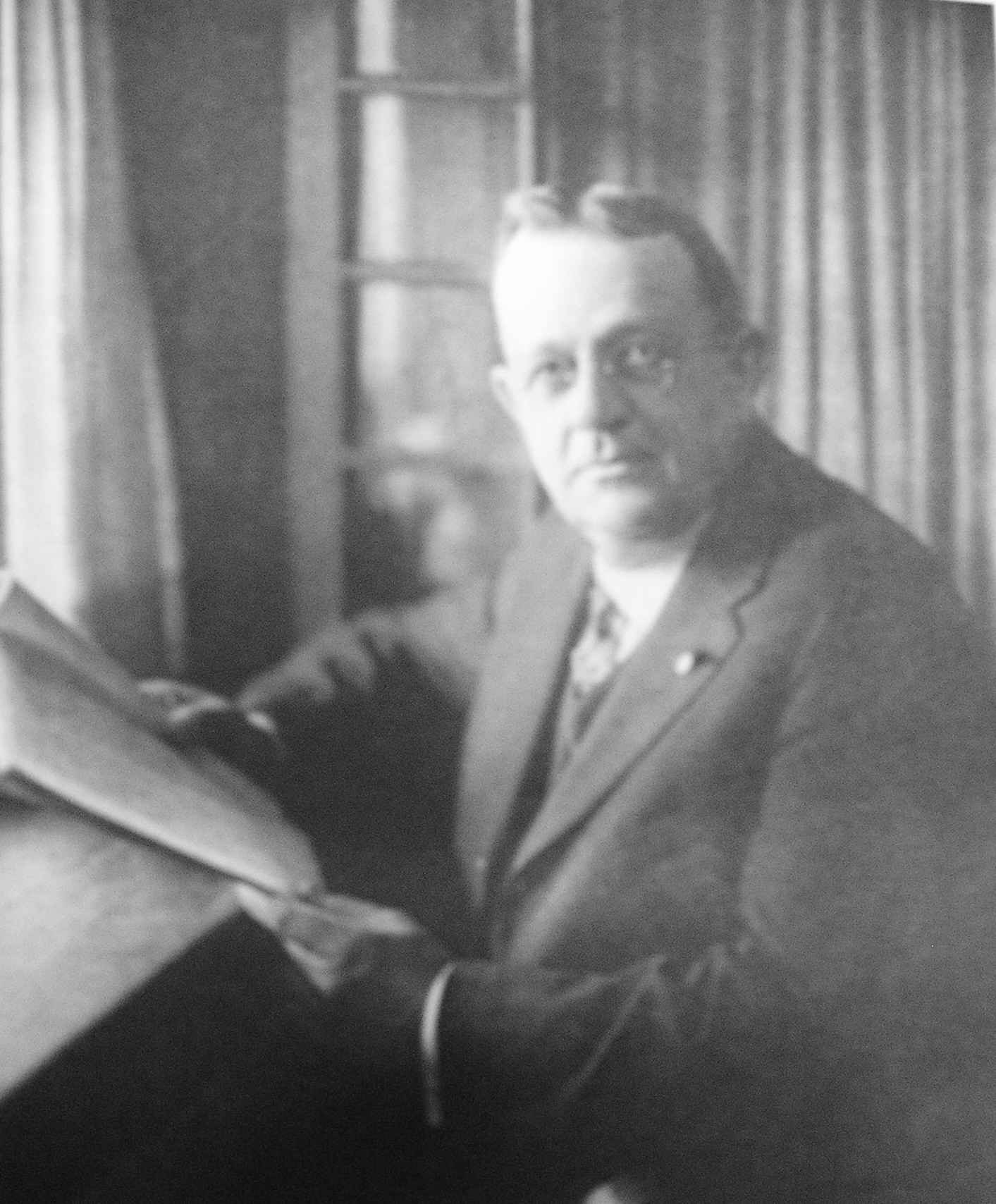
Henry M. Tichenor probably sometime 1914-1919.

Henry Milford Tichenor (October 23, 1858 - December 4, 1922) was a writer and magazine editor prominent in the socialist and freethinking movements during the Progressive Era and the Golden Age of Freethought of American history. His writings frequently condemned organized religion, Christianity in particular, as a tool used by the upper classes to maintain control over the working class. In the realm of opposition to religion, he has been ranked beside Clarence Darrow and Madalyn Murray O'Hair as a leading American freethinker of the twentieth century.

== Biography ==
Tichenor was born on October 23, 1858, in Orange, New Jersey. Stephen Tichenor, the author's father, was a financially successful businessman and politician who was twice the mayor of Orange and served as a judge. Henry was educated by private tutors and at Adams and Prescott Military Academy in Orange. In 1878, at age 20, he launched a career in journalism as a reporter for the Chicago Daily Tribune. In 1894, he helped to establish the Omaha Evening News and in 1895 became assistant editor and later editor of the Springfield Leader-Democrat in Missouri.

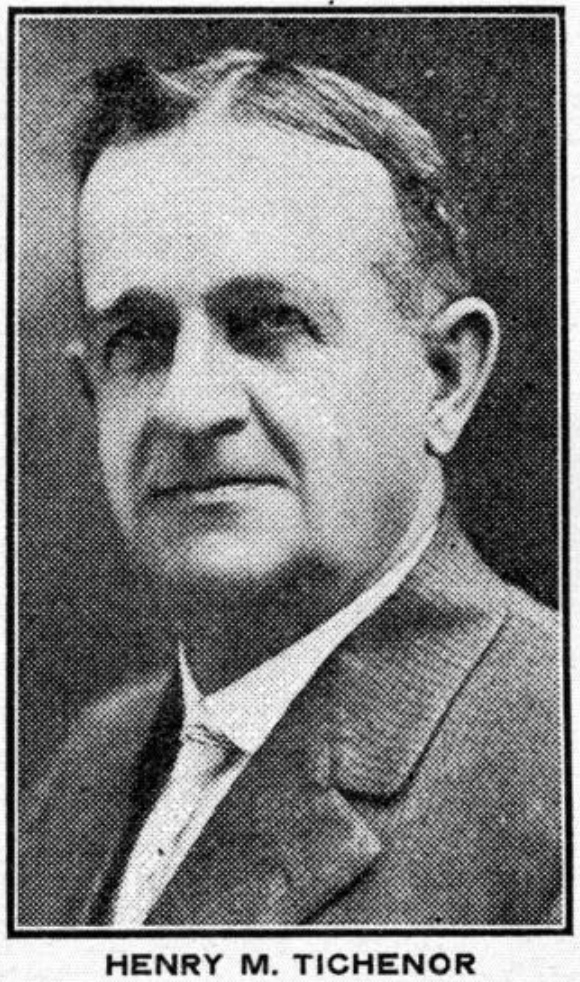
Henry M. Tichenor, 1914

In early life, Tichenor was strongly influenced by reading The Age of Reason, the condemnation of organized religion authored by Thomas Paine, the pamphleteer whose Common Sense helped to inspire the American Revolution. In December 1900, Tichenor began the publication of a magazine called The New Dispensation but the magazine had only a brief existence. Tichenor then worked for several years in the commercial world as a salesman.

Around 1911, he began contributing occasional poems to The National Rip-Saw, “America’s Greatest Socialist Monthly,” edited by Phil Wagner and based in St. Louis, Missouri. By the end of 1912 Tichenor had also published under Wagner at least five pamphlets including; "A Wave of Horror," "The Evils of Capitalism," "The Rip-Saw Mother Goose," "Woman Under Capitalism," and "Rip-Saw Socialism Songs." In January 1913, while continuing to write for the Rip-Saw, Tichenor joined forces with Wagner's publishing company to launch his own socialist journal, The Melting Pot, a publication whose mission proclaimed in the inaugural issue was to subject to fiery scrutiny society's lies of class, privilege, war and most especially organized religion. The cover of the magazine carried an illustration of a metal worker with the tools of his trade and the motto, “If it won’t stand the heat of the Melting Pot, its no good.” Tichenor served as its editor until it ceased publication with his retirement in 1920.

In January 1914 Wagner and Tichenor visited Socialist party leader and former U.S. presidential candidate Eugene V. Debs and persuaded him to write editorials and to speak for The National Rip-Saw. Later that same year, the Rip-Saw issued a collection of Tichenor's poems titled “Rhymes of the Revolution,” including an introduction by Debs in which the prominent socialist heaped breathless praise upon the author: “He hates with a hate that is holy the brazen shams and superstitions inculcated by a mamonized church in the name of religion and scourges without mercy the pious perverts who under the cloak of the Carpenter betray their followers into bondage.”

Another publication to which Tichenor contributed for The National Rip-Saw in 1914 was a series of articles later republished as a 63-page pamphlet titled “Barnhill-Tichenor Debate on Socialism.” The publication included a handful of editorial-style cartoons. One of them depicted an evil, dark-faced Christian minister standing at a dollar-sign pulpit and exhorting a pious yet poor working-class family with “Slaves, be obedient to your masters!” as a fat, rich member of the “master class” looks on smugly.

Under Tichenor's editorship, The Melting Pot established itself as a scathing forum especially for attacking organized religion. The magazine soon set its sights on Billy Sunday, perhaps the most prominent evangelist in America at the time and one particularly notable for his lavish lifestyle. The front page of the August, 1914 issue of the Melting Pot featured a cartoon of Sunday, pockets bulging with money, again using a pulpit with a dollar sign, and preaching to a bloated character labeled “Big Biz.” In 2006, the Bank of Wisdom began selling a compact disc containing the first four years of The Melting Pot; issues published from 1913 to 1917.

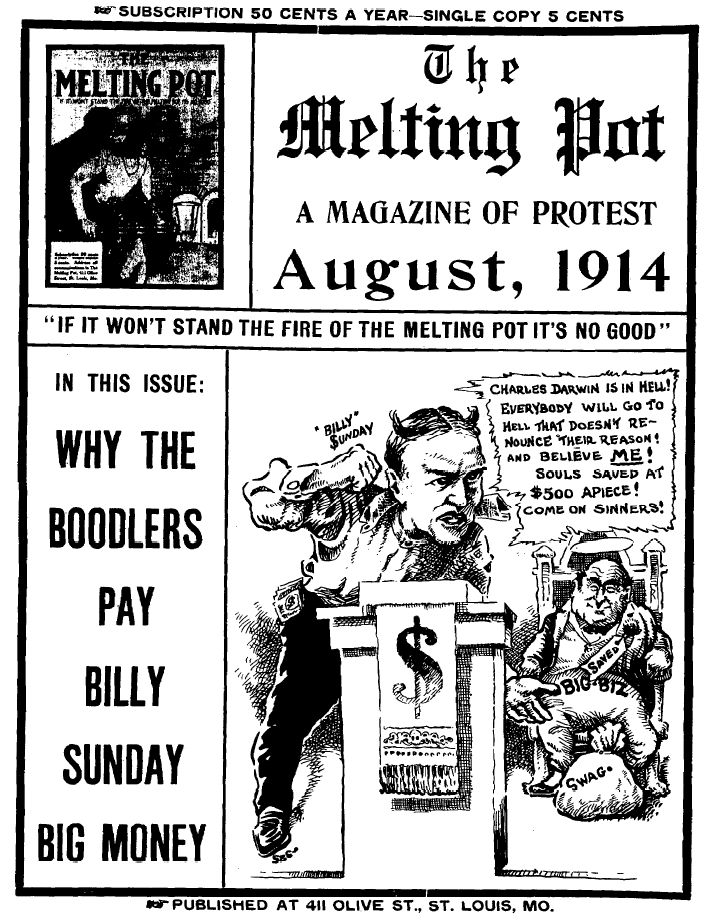
Cover of the August 1914 issue of the Melting Pot magazine.

The Melting Pot was only one of Tichenor's outlets. From 1913 until his death in 1922, Tichenor produced at least six books and twenty-eight pamphlets of social and religious commentary. The tone and pace was set early with the August 1913 publication of the 63-page pamphlet, “The Roman Religion: A Short History of How the Holy Humbug was Hatched.”

In 1915, Tichenor published his first full book-length work, The Life and Exploits of Jehovah, in which he brutally satirized the God of the Old Testament. This was followed the next year with The Creed of Constantine; or the World Needs a New Religion in which Tichenor turned his acid pen upon Christianity. Eugene Debs again wrote in support of Tichenor by producing a review of this book in the January 1917 issue of The National Rip-Saw.

Tichenor refined his assault upon the proponents of religion, particularly Christianity, with the publication of the book, The Sorceries and Scandals of Satan, in 1917. Tichenor's primary objective in this work was to reveal the hypocrisy of the Christian theologians who enthrall churchgoers with tales linking the ills of the world with Satan, the proclaimed opposite of the purportedly good Jehovah which the clergymen claimed to represent. Tichenor's technique for accomplishing this goal was to show that the minor scandals so frequently blamed on Satan, in fact, pale in comparison to the child murder, mass suffering and other horrific crimes perpetrated by the God of the Bible and His followers.

This book was followed by Tales of Theology, Jehovah, Satan and the Christian Creed in 1918, and Mythologies, a Materialistic Interpretation: Analyzing the Class Character of Religion in 1919.

In 1919, the Appeal to Reason newspaper was purchased by its editor, E. Haldeman-Julius, who used its printing plant to begin publishing a series of inexpensive, pocket-sized educational pamphlets designed to help elevate the poor, unschooled working classes by providing them with a means for cheap self-education. The pamphlets were about five inches high, less than 100 pages, and variously titled Peoples Pocket Series, Ten-Cent Pocket Series, or Little Blue Books. In retirement, from 1920 until his death in 1922, Tichenor authored or edited at least 24 of these booklets, many on the subject of religion, beginning with a condensed version of Paine's The Age of Reason and including titles such as Church History, Primitive Beliefs, When the Puritans Were in Power, and The Olympian Gods. In the Little Blue Book series alone, Tichenor was one of the best-selling contributors with 14 titles which sold 1,135,000 copies.

== Pamphlets and Books by Tichenor ==
The Evils of Capitalism - A Reply to W. F. Lemmons' book, "The Evils of Socialism," 35p., The National Rip-Saw Publ Co, 1912.

Woman Under Capitalism, 32 p., National Rip-Saw Pub. Co., 1912.

A Wave of Horror: A Comparative Picture of the Los Angeles Tragedy, 31 p., National Rip-Saw Pub. Co., 1912

The Rip-Saw Mother Goose, 32 p., National Rip-Saw Pub. Co., 1912

The Roman Religion: A Short History of How the Holy Humbug was Hatched, 64 p., Melting Pot, 1913.

Rhymes from the Revolution, 68p., National Rip-Saw Pub. Co., 1914.

Barnhill-Tichenor Debate on Socialism, 63p., National Rip-Saw Pub. Co., 1914

The Life and Exploits of Jehovah, 224 p., Phil Wagner Publ, St. Louis, MO., 1915.

The Creed of Constantine; or the World Needs a New Religion, 189p., Phil Wagner, St. Louis. 1916.

The Sorceries and Scandals of Satan, 177 p., Phil. Wagner Publ, 1917.

Tales of Theology, Jehovah, Satan and the Christian creed, 580 p., The Melting Pot Publ Co, 1918.

The Dictatorship of the Profiteering Class, 28 p., Melting Pot Pub. Co, 1919.

Mythologies, A Materialistic Interpretation: Analyzing the Class Character of Religion, 198 p., The Melting Pot Pub. Co., 1919.

TICHENOR'S "LITTLE BLUE BOOK" PAMPHLETS FOR HALDEMAN-JULIUS

Paine, Thomas. The Age of Reason. Condensed by H.M. Tichenor, No. 4, 1920

Dumas, Alexander. Crimes of the Borgias. Ed. H.M. Tichenor, No. 66. 1922

Church History, No. 67. 1921.

Life of Madame DuBarry, No. 123. 1922

The Theory of Reincarnation Explained, No. 124. 1922

Biology and Spiritual Philosophy, No. 140A.1922

Chinese Philosophy of Life, No 153, 1922

Voices from the Past, No. 169B, 1921

Constantine and the Beginnings of Christianity, No. 170B, 1922

Life of Jack London, No. 183. 1923.

Primitive Beliefs, No. 184. 1921.

Satan and the Saints, No. 201. 1921

Survival of the Fittest, No. 202. 1921

Sun Worship and Later Beliefs, No. 204. 1921

When the Puritans Were in Power, No. 286.

The Olympian Gods, No. 207. 1921

Machiavelli, [Niccolo]. The Prince. Ed. H.M. Tichenor. No. 320. 1922.

The Buddhist Philosophy of Life. No. 322. 1922

The Life of Joan of Arc. No. 323. 1922

A Guide to Emerson. No. 338. 1923

Renan, Ernest. Life of Jesus. Ed. H.M. Tichenor. No. 340. 1923

Life of Columbus. No. 343. 1923.

Irish Fairy Tales, No. 397, 1923

Irish Folk Songs and Tales. Ed. H.M. Tichenor. No. 398. 1923.
