= Roy E. Burt =

Roy E. Burt, circa 1936.

Roy Everett Burt (September 16, 1890 – April 14, 1967) was a Methodist clergyman and an American socialist politician and functionary. Burt is best remembered as the Executive Secretary of the Socialist Party of America from 1936 to 1939.

== Biography ==
=== Early years ===
Burt was born on a farm in Coles County, Illinois, on September 16, 1890, to Zenas Wesley Burt and Cora May Hall. His family moved to Kansas when Roy was 9 years old. Later they left the farm to move to a mining community in the Southeastern part of the state.

As a boy, Burt worked in and around the mines and as a clerk in shops in his hometown.

Burt earned a teacher's degree from the University of Kansas at Lawrence and did graduate work at Northwestern University and the Garrett Biblical Institute. He worked as a teacher, principal, and high school superintendent in Northeastern Oklahoma.

Burt was ordained a minister of the Methodist Episcopal Church and served a pastor of a Methodist Episcopal Church in Rock Springs, Wyoming, for 4 1/2 years. During this interval, Burt also conducted a Labor college in cooperation with the Central Trades Union of Rock Springs and served as associate director of workers' education for the state of Wyoming under the auspices of the Wyoming State Federation of Labor.

He married Ethyl E. Denton on 30 December 30, 1913. During the years of the World War I, Burt resided in Lawrence, Kansas. Burt remained active in the church throughout his life as a Christian socialist.

From 1928 to 1933, Burt was connected with the Board of Education of the Methodist Episcopal Church, studying and investigating social and economic problems.

Burt was a member of the Retail Clerks Union and the American Federation of Teachers during his working career.

=== Political career ===
During the 1930s, Burt worked for the Socialist Party as a field organizer, a job which took him to almost every state of the union during the course of his activities establishing and building party locals.

In 1932, Burt was the candidate of the Socialist Party of Illinois for Governor of Illinois.

During the fall 1936 electoral campaign, Burt was employed as a speaker on behalf of the Thomas-Nelson campaign. He spoke continuously from September 13 to November 1, starting his tour in Pennsylvania before heading to the Pacific coast and back through the Southwest. He was also one of the Socialist Party of America's nominees in that year's election for trustees of the University of Illinois.

Roy Burt took over for Norman Thomas protégé Clarence O. Senior as Executive Secretary of the Socialist Party of America effective December 15, 1936.

After taking a leave of absence on March 1, 1939, during which he was replaced temporarily by Arthur G. McDowell, Burt resigned as National Executive Secretary late in that same month. He was replaced at the April 15–17, 1939 session of the National Executive Committee by Travers Clement of Los Gatos, California, himself a member of the NEC.

=== Later years, death and legacy ===
After leaving the post of Executive Secretary of the Socialist Party, Burt accepted the post of associate pastor of the Wesley Methodist Church in Minneapolis, Minnesota. He died on April 14, 1967, in Topeka, Kansas.

== Works ==
- A Young People’s Course on Christianity and the Rural Life of the World. New York: Missionary Education Movement of the United States and Canada, n.d. [c. 1931].
- Adventures in Building a Better World. Chicago: The Board of Education of the Methodist Episcopal Church, 1933.
- Report to the Special Convention: Chicago, March 26–29, 1937. [Chicago]: [Socialist Party], 1937
- Socialist Handbook, 1937. (Editor) Chicago: Socialist Party, 1937.
- Community Service for Youth: A Guide to Christian Social Thinking and Action. Nashville: Methodist Publishing House, 1941.
