= YMCA Hotel (Chicago) =

- U.S. National Register of Historic Places
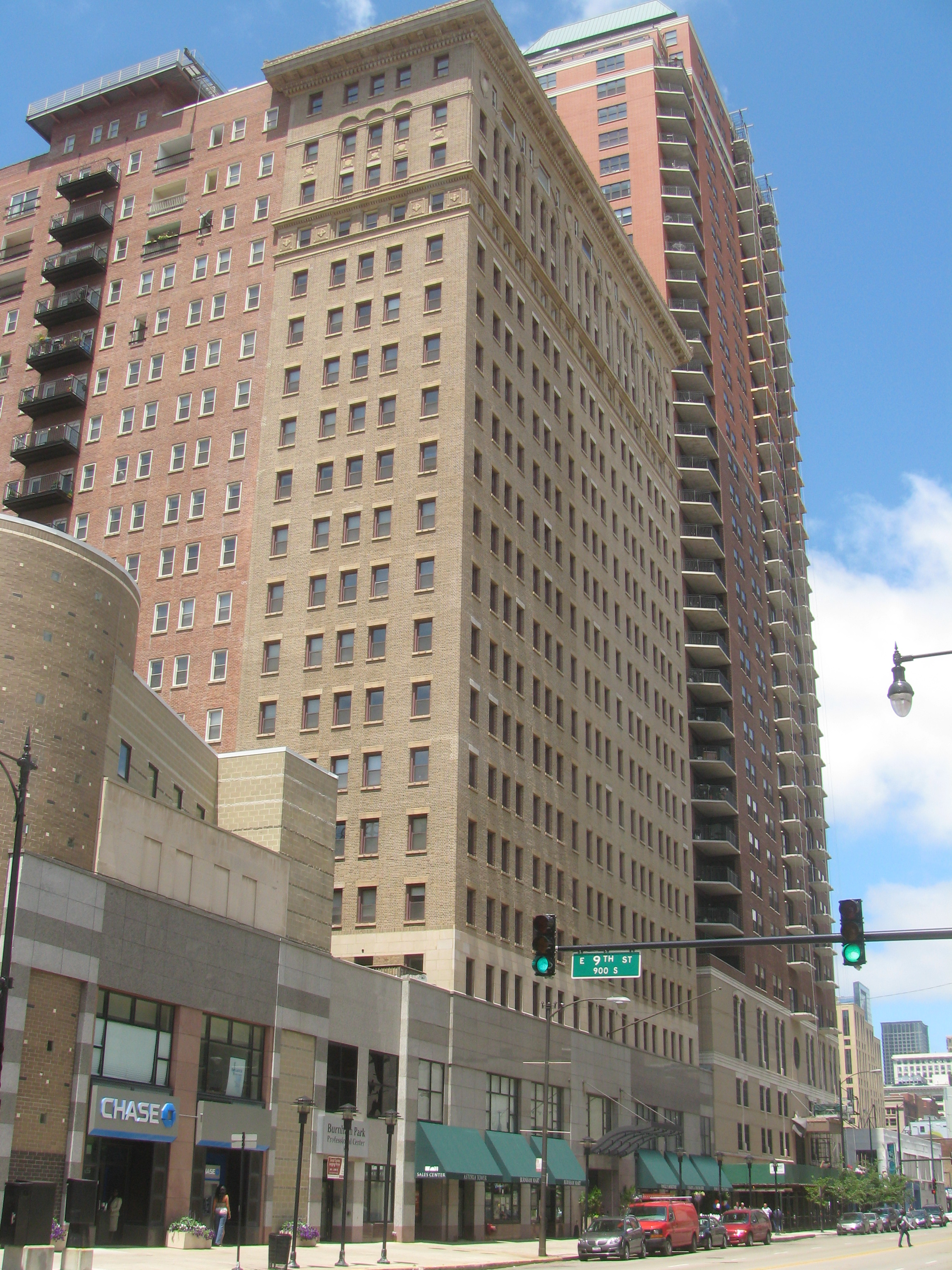

- Location within Chicago metropolitan area Location within Illinois Location within the United States
- Location: 820–828 S. Wabash Ave., Chicago, Illinois
- Coordinates: 41°52′17″N 87°37′34″W
- Area: less than one acre
- Architect: Robert Berlin, James G. Rogers
- Architectural style: Late 19th And 20th Century Revivals, Italian Renaissance
- NRHP reference No.: 89001202
- Added to NRHP: August 30, 1989

The YMCA Hotel is a historic former hotel located in the Loop community area of Chicago, Illinois. The hotel, which was designed by Robert C. Berlin and James Gamble Rogers, opened in 1916. Originally marketed by YMCA as a cheap residence for young, single men, the hotel began marketing to a wider clientele when the Great Depression created a demand for inexpensive lodging. The hotel's status and customers declined with the surrounding neighborhood, and it closed in 1979; it reopened as an apartment building in 1985. The hotel was added to the National Register of Historic Places on August 30, 1989.

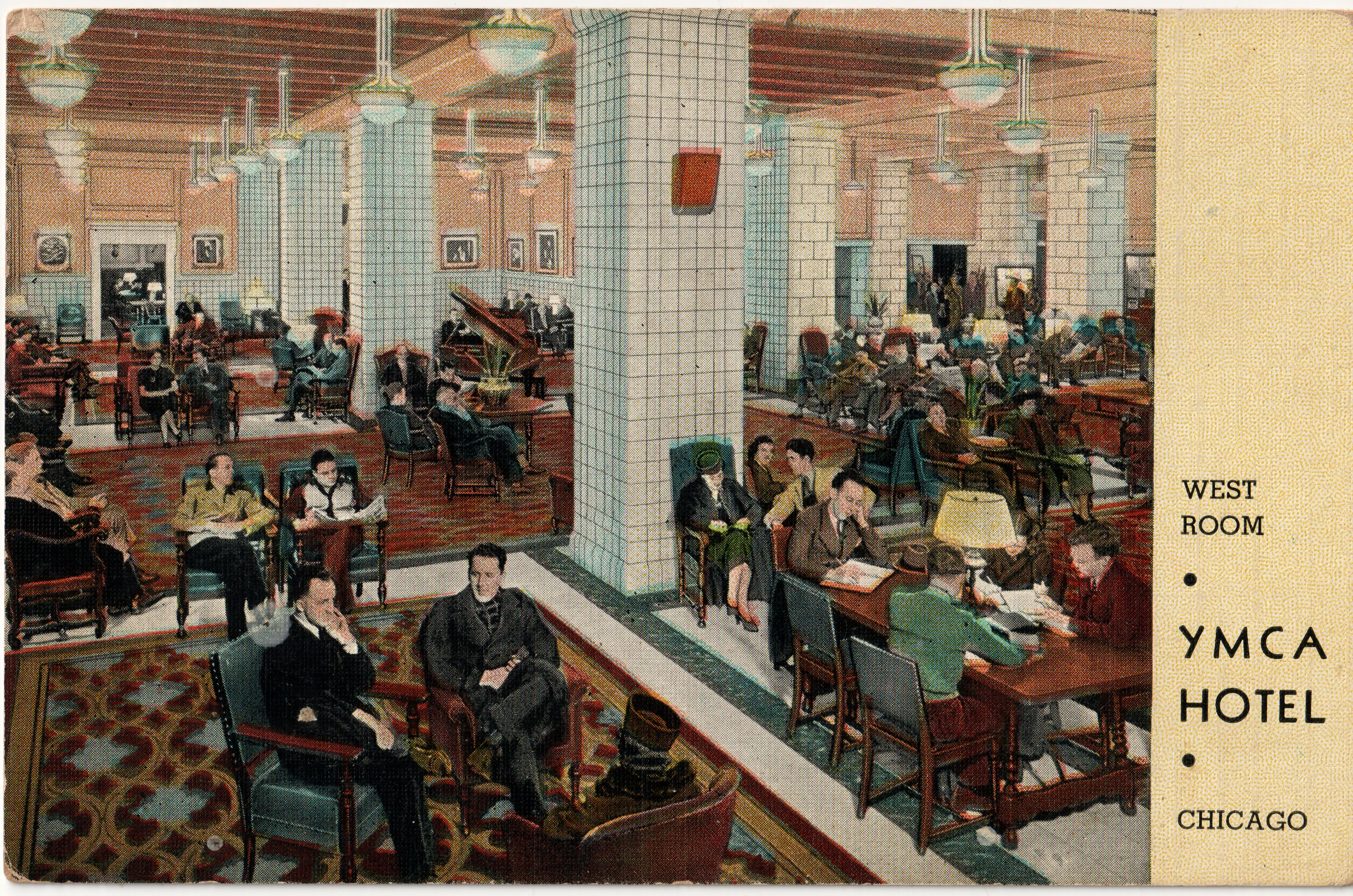
West Room of the hotel
