= Clarence Senior =

American socialist political activist

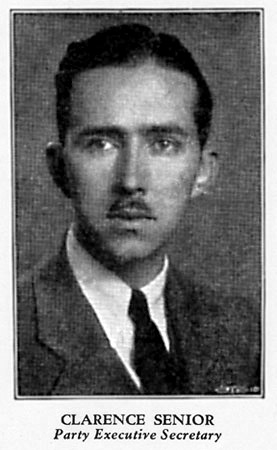
Clarence O. Senior, 1936 Socialist Party portrait.

Clarence Ollson Senior (1903–1974) was an American socialist political activist best remembered as the National Executive Secretary of the Socialist Party of America during the 1930s. Originally a protégé of presidential candidate Norman Thomas, during the inner-party fight of the 1930s, Senior became an active supporter of the so-called "Militant" faction. After resigning his post late in 1936, Senior returned to graduate school, becoming a widely published academic specializing on the affairs of Puerto Rico and other nations of the Caribbean.

== Biography ==
=== Early years ===
Clarence Ollson Senior was born in 1903.

He attended the University of Kansas, where he was active in the Student League for Industrial Democracy, the current incarnation of the Intercollegiate Socialist Society headed by Harry W. Laidler. Senior worked his way through high school and college, performing a variety of jobs, including work as a mechanic, night watchman, truck driver, shipping clerk and working in a soap factory.

Upon graduation from Kansas, Senior had become associated with the League of Kansas Municipalities before moving to join the Cleveland Federation of Teachers in Cleveland, Ohio.

In 1927, Senior joined the Socialist Party of America. Historian Bernard K. Johnpoll indicates that Senior was an acolyte of rising Socialist Party star Norman Thomas even in these early days, representative of the sort of middle class intellectuals which Thomas sought to bring into the party.

Senior spent three months in Europe in 1928 studying workers' education on behalf of the Adult Education Association. While in Europe, Senior attended a conference of the War Resisters' International and was a delegate to the World Youth Peace Congress held in the Netherlands.

=== Political career ===
During the second half of the 1920s, the Socialist Party was headed by William H. Henry, a venerable party loyalist from Indiana. Historian Irving Howe recalled Henry as an inept figure:

"...provincial, bumbling, half-literate – one of those figures from the Midwest who might have stepped out of a Dreiser novel depicting the struggle of small-town Americans for the rudiments of culture. That the Socialist Party could find no one better to run its day-to-day affairs tells almost everything about its decline."

When the Spring of 1929, Executive Secretary of the Socialist Party Henry fell into personal difficulties with his wife, Emma Henry, herself the SPA's State Secretary in Indiana, Executive Secretary Henry abruptly resigned his office. The governing National Executive Committee found themselves in a position of needing to find a permanent replacement, appointing Mabel H. Barnes to fulfill the role on a temporary basis.

The NEC targeted the 27-year-old college-educated Clarence Senior for the position, bringing him to New York City for conversations with key party leaders. Senior confessed that he felt inadequate to the task of assuming the position of National Executive Secretary of the Socialist Party owing to his rather superficial knowledge of socialist theory. Morris Hillquit queried the young man from Cleveland: "You've read Comrade Laidler's book, haven't you?" Senior allowed that he had. Harry Laidler continued in the same vein: "You've read Comrade Hillquit's book, haven't you?" Again, Senior responded in the affirmative. "What more do you need to know about socialist theory?" asked Morris Hillquit with a smile.

The NEC arbitrarily waived the party's constitutional requirement that the Executive Secretary be a party member for at least three years and named Senior to the position. The formal nomination of Senior was made by NEC member Victor L. Berger on June 11, 1929, and was approved by a vote of 6 to 2, with 1 abstention, on June 19.

The Socialist Party was in a tenuous position when Senior was finally able to assume his new position in August 1929. The party owed money to its printer and was nearly two years in arrears in the payment of its dues to the Socialist International in Switzerland. Party membership was at its nadir, less than 8,000, about half of whom were members of non-English-speaking foreign language federations. Senior was instrumental in solidifying the party's financial situation through economical operation of the national office and through the successful solicitation of funds from the organization's loyal remaining membership core.

Senior also set about building the size of the Socialist Party's membership ranks. Historian David A. Shannon recalled:

"When Clarence Senior became national secretary in the summer of 1929, he brought to the national office some long-needed vigor. the results were immediate. By the end of 1929 the Socialist Party had gained more members than it had in all the years since 1923. Through the United Socialist Drive it had raised more funds than it had in years, it had revived the flow of Socialist pamphlets which had all but dried up since the war, and it had boosted the circulation of Socialist newspapers....

Senior established a Social Problems Lecture Bureau bringing Socialist speakers to paying audiences around the country, promoting the party's cause and bringing in needed funds at the same time. Senior also targeted sympathetic individuals who were not formal members of the Socialist Party in his fund-raising efforts, sending out 10,000 letters as part of a 1931 campaign called the "Socialism Forward Drive." These efforts proved to be relatively successful. "The Socialist Party never had enough money to do all it wanted to, but Senior's money-raising enabled it to do more than it had for over a decade," Shannon notes.

While the Socialist Party received an injection of enthusiasm in the aftermath of the first presidential run of Norman Thomas in November 1928 and gained adherents in the aftermath of the 1929 Wall Street crash and the coming of the Great Depression, many believe the party's growth during the first half of the 1930s was also due to Clarence Senior's energetic leadership. Historian David Shannon called 1930. Senior's first year on the job as Executive Secretary, "the first full year of vigorous leadership for the party since [Otto] Branstetter resigned in the early 1920s." A period of growth followed, with 32 new SPA locals established in 1930, 96 more in 1931, and nearly 600 in 1932.

With the influx of new members came a radicalization of the Socialist Party, with many newcomers professing a belief in revolutionary socialism rather than strictly concentrating upon biannual parliamentary campaigns. From about 1930 these new radicals organized themselves into a formal faction known as the "Militants," while older, more tradition-bound members also formally organized themselves as a so-called "Old Guard faction." Senior aligned himself with the younger, more vigorous, and more radical forces and against the "Old Guard." In the summer of 1933 the Militants, with Senior as their ostensible spokesman, sought to remove "official" status from the New York weekly newspaper The New Leader, the voice of the Old Guard edited by James Oneal – an action which earned the enmity of the slighted moderates.

Personal antipathy was also intertwined in this factional struggle. Ever since 1928, party presidential candidate Norman Thomas had been at odds with National Chairman Morris Hillquit, the best known and most widely respected of the Old Guard leaders. According to one historian, Thomas had played a leading role in an effort to oust Hillquit:

"Thomas believed that Hillquit acted as a brake on Socialist activity nationally at a time when Thomas's protégé, Clarence Senior, was trying to make the party an effective organization. For these reasons, Thomas was instrumental in arranging for a coalition of all anti-Hillquit elements in an effort to wrest the national chairmanship from him."

At the same time the Old Guard, with National Chairman Morris Hillquit at their head, sought to remove Senior from his post as National Executive Secretary in favor of their own man, Marx Lewis, who had recently led successful fundraising efforts on behalf of the Milwaukee socialist daily newspaper, The Milwaukee Leader.

Although the governing NEC of the party was narrowly split between the followers of Hillquit and Thomas, Clarence Senior was narrowly able to retain his position in 1932 due to the concerted effort of the Thomas group. This phase of the inner-party struggle ended in October 1933, when Hillquit died from the tuberculosis which had plagued him throughout his life and the balance of power shifted further away from the Old Guard in the Socialist Party.

In August 1933, Senior was elected one of six delegates of the SPA to a special conference of the Labor and Socialist International held in Paris. Senior was joined by three other members of the Militant faction, including Paul Blanshard and Professor Maynard Krueger, as well as two supporters of the Old Guard, Hermann Kobbe and Jacob Panken. The Militant majority of the American delegation lent their support to what one historian has called a "quasi-Communist resolution" calling for "workers' democracy" – a position which factional patriarch Norman Thomas did not share. Thomas was placed in a difficult position when this action of his allies was repudiated at a national conference of the SPA held in Detroit in June 1934.

In 1935, the Socialist Party began an official party newspaper, The Socialist Call, in opposition to The New Leader, and the organization moved towards a formal split, with James Oneal, Louis Waldman, Algernon Lee, and the Old Guard leaving the party immediately after the May 1936 Cleveland Convention to form the Social Democratic Federation (SDF). Senior remained in the post of Executive Secretary through the November 1936 election, resigning in December so that he might go to Mexico to "recover his health." The retiring Senior was feted at a dinner in his honor at the Cafe Idrott in Chicago on the evening of December 12, 1936.

Senior was replaced by Roy E. Burt, effective December 15, 1936. The Roosevelt landslide in the 1936 election in the face of a full Socialist campaign was disheartening and amidst the faction fighting and splits, party membership dropped precipitously. By February 1937 less than 6,500 paid members remained in the organization.

With the end of Senior's tenure as Executive Secretary of the Socialist Party, his political career essentially drew to a close. A new chapter of his life awaited him in the world of academia.

=== Academic career ===
Around 1940, Senior returned to college, attending the University of Kansas City (now the University of Missouri-Kansas City) in the Department of Political Science and History. In 1942 he completed his Masters' thesis, entitled The Kansas City, Mexico and Orient Railroad.

Senior went on to publish a wide range of journal articles and books, specializing on Puerto Rican affairs with an emphasis on matters of emigration and the problems of the Puerto Rican working class. Senior was also the biographer of Puerto Rican socialist and labor leader Santiago Iglesias, with his book published on that figure in 1972.

=== Later years, death, and legacy ===
Clarence Senior died in 1974.

A portion of Clarence Senior's papers, dating from 1924 through 1945, are held in the Social Action Collection of the Wisconsin Historical Society at Madison.

== Works ==
=== Books and pamphlets ===
- Organizing the World for Socialism. Girard, KS: Haldeman-Julius Publications, 1931.
- Facing the Housing Problem. Milwaukee, WI: Milwaukee Housing Council, 1938.
- Mexico in Transition. New York: League for Industrial Democracy, 1939.
- Democracy Comes to a Cotton Kingdom: The Story of Mexico's La Laguna. Mexico City: Centro de Estudios Pedagogicos e Hispanoamericanos, 1940.
- Self-Determination for Puerto Rico. New York: Post War World Council, 1946.
- The Puerto Rican Migrant in St. Croix. University of Puerto Rico, 1947. from the Diaspora Project Digital Humanities Center at the University of Puerto Rico, Río Piedras
- The Puerto Ricans of New York City. With Carmen Isales. New York: New York Office, Employment and Migration Bureau, Puerto Rico Dept. of Labor, n.d. [c. 1948].
- Puerto Rican Dispersed Migration: A Pilot Investigation. New York: Bureau of Applied Social Research, Columbia University, 1949.
- A Selected Bibliography on Puerto Rico and the Puerto Ricans. With Josefina de Román. New York: Migration Division, Dept. of Labor of Puerto Rico, 1951.
- Labor Unions and Spanish-Speaking Workers: Report on Conference held December 20, 1952. New York: Dept. of Labor, Commonwealth of Puerto Rico, 1953.
- Migrants: People not Problems. New York: Commonwealth of Puerto Rico, Dept. of Labor, Migration Division, n.d. [c. 1954].
- A Report on Jamaican Migration to Great Britain. Kingston, Jamaica: Government Printer, 1955.
- Puerto Rican Migration: Spontaneous and Organized. Washington: US Government Printing Office, 1955.
- The West Indian in Britain. London: Fabian Colonial Bureau, 1956.
- Land Reform and Democracy. Gainesville: University of Florida Press, 1958.
- Strangers – Then neighbors: From Pilgrims to Puerto Ricans. New York: Freedom Books, 1961.
- Migration as a Process and the Migrant as a Person: Address Made on June 12, 1961. Geneva: World Council of Churches, 1961.
- The Puerto Ricans: Strangers – Then Neighbors. Chicago: Quadrangle Books, 1965.
- Our Citizens from the Caribbean. St. Louis: McGraw-Hill, 1965.
- Toward Cultural Democracy. New York: Selected Academic Readings, 1968.
- Santiago Iglesias: Labor Crusader. Hato Rey, Puerto Rico: Interamerican University Press, 1972.

=== Articles ===
- "The International Socialist Conference," American Socialist Quarterly, vol. 2, no. 4 (Autumn 1933), pp. 20–26.
- "Mexico's Road to Social Revolution," Socialist Review, Part 1: vol. 6, no. 3 (October–November 1937), pp. 10–12. Part 2: vol. 6, no. 4 (January–February 1938), pp. 11–13.
- "Community Health Services in Mexico," The American Journal of Nursing, vol. 41, no. 3 (March 1941), pg. 318.
- "Migration and Puerto Rico's Population Problem," The Annals of the American Academy of Political and Social Science, vol. 285 (January 1953), pp. 130–136.
- "Patterns of Puerto Rican Dispersion in the Continental United States," Social Problems, vol. 2, no. 2 (October 1954), pp. 93–99.
- "Migration and Economic Development in Puerto Rico," The Journal of Educational Sociology, vol. 28, no. 4 (December 1954), pp. 151–156.
- "Race Relations and Labor Supply in Great Britain," Social Problems, vol. 4, no. 4 (April 1957), pp. 302–312.
- "The Puerto Ricans in New York: A Progress Note," International Migration Review, vol. 2, no. 2 (Spring 1968), pp. 73–79.

== See also ==
- Socialist Party of America
