= Helen Thompson Sunday =

American evangelist (1868–1957)

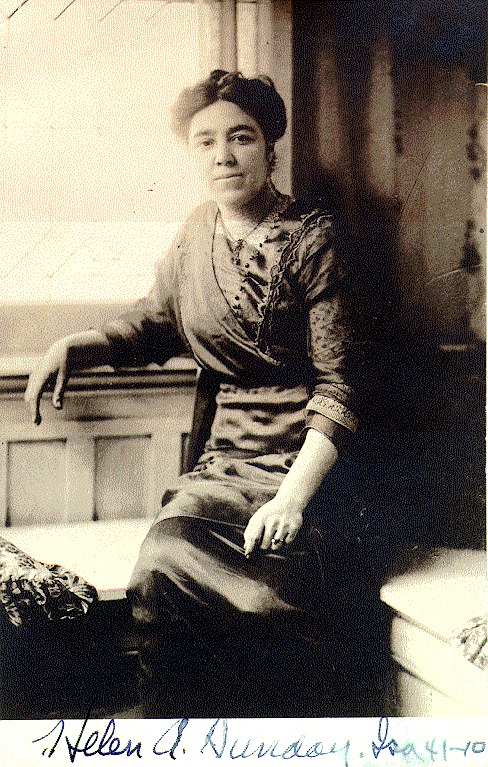
- Sunday in 1912
- Born: Helen Amelia Thompson; June 25, 1868; Dundee, Illinois, US
- Died: February 20, 1957 (aged 88); Phoenix, Arizona, US
- Resting place: Forest Home Cemetery, Forest Park, Illinois
- Spouse: Billy Sunday (m. 1888; died 1935)

Helen Amelia Thompson Sunday (June 25, 1868 – February 20, 1957) was an American evangelist and the wife of Billy Sunday. She organized his large evangelistic campaigns during the first decades of the twentieth century and later became an evangelistic speaker in her own right.

== Early life and marriage ==
Helen Sunday, called "Nell" or "Ma" by her husband, was born to William and Ellen Binnie Thompson in Dundee, Illinois. Her father, a prosperous businessman and a staunch Presbyterian of Scottish heritage, moved the family to Chicago in 1869.

As a teenager, Nell taught a Sunday School class at Jefferson Park Presbyterian Church, and by eighteen, she had been made supervisor of the Intermediate Department and was an influential member of the Christian Endeavor Society, the Presbyterian youth organization. Recognizing her executive abilities, her father sent her to business college, although her mother objected to such "unladylike" pursuits.

According to an oft-repeated story, Helen said that she had met Billy Sunday at a church social shortly after his conversion to Christianity. William Thompson at first objected to the noted White Stockings baseball player becoming the suitor of his daughter. Nevertheless, he softened, and the couple was married in the Thompson home on September 5, 1888. The Sundays had four children: Helen Edith (1890), George Marquis (1892), William Ashley Jr. (1901) and Paul Thompson (1907).

== Evangelistic campaign manager ==
Billy Sunday had left professional baseball for religious work in 1891, and by 1896, he had begun his own evangelistic career. Billy, who was naturally shy and who had suffered a series of losses as a child, leaned on Nell for emotional support as well as for such mundane chores as paying his bills, making his travel arrangements, and generally putting his affairs in order. Billy trusted Nell's "good horse sense" and averred that he had "never yet gone contrary to Mrs. Sunday's advice" without finding himself "up against it."

In 1908, Nell and Billy agreed that she would travel with him, leaving the three younger children in the care of a nanny. Nell managed the campaign organization and energized the Sunday publicity machine. Her formidable manner "struck terror to the hearts" of those who tried to take advantage of her husband. Her loyalty and sincerity made her Billy's mainstay. Nell acted as a buffer between Sunday and the outside world, making it possible for him to concentrate on his preaching. It is doubtful that without her assistance he could have become the sensational attraction that he became.

As Sunday's campaigns grew larger, Nell herself began to speak regularly at women's meetings and civic organizations, becoming a significant religious figure in her own right. She answered Sunday's voluminous mail, and for a few years at the height of her husband's popularity during World War I, Nell even wrote (or at least, had ghost written) a syndicated feature called "Mrs. Billy Sunday’s Column," in which she dispensed advice to women about such dangers to their womanhood as dancing and flirting. Nell Sunday supported greater opportunities for women, including women's work during World War I. In one column she wrote, "At last, the doors of the Doll House have been opened and women have been invited to come into the great world outside. The rest is in their own hands."

== Children ==
The Sundays’ three sons, pampered but largely reared by strangers, embarrassed their parents with their errant lifestyles. George was arrested for drunkenness and auto theft before he committed suicide in 1933. Billy Jr. died in an automobile accident in 1938; and Paul, a test pilot, died in an airplane crash in 1944. Furthermore, their oldest child, Helen Haines, though happily married, developed a degenerative disease and died of pneumonia in 1932.

The boys’ ex-wives remained a continuing dilemma for the Sundays. Some blackmailed the evangelist to keep quiet about their son's infidelities. Others used gentler techniques to extract money, and Nell often provided friendly advice to the women when she responded with financial assistance.

== Career of her own ==
When Billy Sunday died in 1935, Nell became the guardian of her husband's image while also embarking on her own 22-year ministry, preaching, encouraging young evangelists and raising money for Christian organizations, especially rescue missions such as the Pacific Garden Mission, where her husband had been converted. On one occasion she told Grace Theological Seminary President Alva J. McClain, who was introducing her, "You sit down now so I can talk to these young people about the Lord!"

A "sketchy housekeeper," Nell Sunday was noted for scavenging food for later meals when invited to dinner. Thriftier than anyone else in the Sunday family, Nell was nonetheless generous with both her time and her money, especially where she perceived a genuine need. Furthermore, she had a sense of humor that "helped her bear heavy tragedies and got her easily over some rough places." And she could laugh at herself as well as others.

Nell Sunday lived long enough to speak at early Billy Graham crusades, and she frequently visited Bob Jones College, where she was given an honorary degree in 1940. (A residence hall on the Greenville campus was also named in her honor.)

In her later years, Nell Sunday suffered from cataracts, heart attacks, and cancer. In 1957, she died in Phoenix, Arizona, where she had been spending the winter with her grandson, Paul Haines. Old friends conducted her funeral. After two eulogies, Bob Jones Jr. said, "I can hear Ma Sunday now saying, 'That's enough of this foolishness. Let's get down to business and talk about Jesus.'"
