= New York Call =

American socialist newspaper

Front page of an early edition of the New York Evening Call. The daily launched on May 30, 1908.

The New York Call was a socialist daily newspaper published in New York City from 1908 through 1923. The Call was the second of three English-language dailies affiliated with the Socialist Party of America, following the Chicago Daily Socialist (1906–1912) and preceding the Milwaukee Leader (1911–1938).

== History ==
=== Political background ===
In 1899 a bitter factional fight swept the Socialist Labor Party of America (SLP), pitting loyalists to the party's English-language newspaper, The People, and its intense and autocratic editor, Daniel DeLeon, against a dissident faction organized around the party's German-language paper, the New Yorker Volkszeitung. In addition to personal antipathy, the two sides differed on the fundamental question of trade union policy, with the DeLeon faction favoring a continuation of the party's policy of establishing an explicitly socialist union organization and the dissidents seeking to abandon the course of dual unionism so that closer relations to the established unions of the American Federation of Labor could be forged.

A bitter split had ensued, with the dissident wing — pejoratively called "Kangaroos" by the DeLeonist SLP Regulars — attempting to appropriate the name of the organization and its English-language newspaper for themselves. The matter ended up in the courts, with SLP Executive Secretary Henry Kuhn, Daniel DeLeon, and the Regulars victorious in the legal battle. The losers were forced by the court to change their name and the name of their publication so that no electoral or commercial confusion would result from the factional dualism.

On April 28, 1901, the losing side in the litigation, the so-called "Socialist Labor Party" headquartered in Rochester, New York, headed by Henry Slobodin, relaunched their weekly New York City newspaper with a new name — The Worker. Old numbering used previously for their version of The People was carried forward, with the first issued under the new banner designated "Volume 11, Number 4." The paper was edited by Algernon Lee, assisted by Horace Traubel, Joshua Wanhope, and others.

=== Fundraising efforts ===
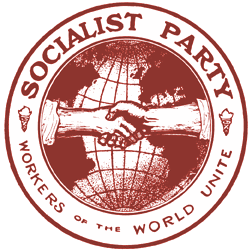
The working title for the New York Call during the earliest phase of fundraising was the Daily Globe, an allusion to the logo of the Socialist Party.

Even before the split there had been an effort by New York members of the SLP to establish an English-language daily newspaper. In November 1900 a meeting was held in Clarendon Hall on East 13th Street and it determined to revive an essentially defunct organization founded in 1886 for the purpose of starting a newspaper, the Workingmen's Co-operative Publishing Association (WCPA), with a goal of publishing an English daily as soon as a fund of $50,000 was accumulated for the task. After a search, Julius Gerber managed to locate six surviving members of the old WCPA who remained interested in starting a new socialist newspaper were located and the organization was thus relaunched on its new task.

Fundraising proved neither quick nor easy. In November 1901 a fair was held for the benefit of the Volkszeitung, raising several thousand dollars over a four-day period so in the fall of 1902 the WCPA decided to repeat this idea to raise funds for the English daily the next spring. The fair was held in March 1903; during its 16-day duration a linotype machine was put into action as a practical demonstration and a sample newspaper called the Daily Globe was produced. Raffles were conducted, amusements held, food and drink sold, and several thousand dollars were raised for the future English daily, which was planned to be revisit the name New York Daily Globe on a permanent basis. This idea came to naught, however, when another New York paper changed its name to the Globe early in the spring of 1904. Suggestions were made for a new name for the forthcoming publication and the Daily Call was decided upon, with a launch date of September 1, 1904, targeted.

The WCPA and its project lost its fundraising mojo, however, owing to the excitement and expense of the 1904 Presidential campaign of Eugene V. Debs and New York Socialist Party stalwart Ben Hanford. By the end of June it had become clear that the drive to raise even the more modest sum of $35,000 would be met in failure and the birth of the Daily Call was necessarily postponed.

While another successful fundraising fair was held in 1905, a growing range of new projects among New York Socialists, including the Rand School of Social Science, the Intercollegiate Socialist Society, the Christian Socialist Fellowship, and New York City elections in 1907 robbed the project to establish a daily Socialist newspaper of active supporters. By the fall of 1907, the number of people actively working on the project of establishing a daily paper was down to just six people, including future chief of the New York organization Julius Gerber and past National Executive Secretary of the Springfield wing of the Social Democratic Party William Butscher. A decision was made to hold one more fundraising fair and then to launch the paper on May Day, 1908, regardless of whether or not the desired nest egg of $50,000 had been accumulated. The fair proved a financial success, the proposed May Day launch of the Call was moved back to Memorial Day, and the daily newspaper was born.

=== Launch of the daily ===
Former Socialist Party of America Executive Secretary William Mailly was the first Managing Editor of the New York Call.

On May 30, 1908, the new socialist daily newspaper was launched — the New York Call. While the Yiddish-language and German-language socialists of New York City had long had daily newspapers of their own, The Call was remarkable as the first such effort for English-speaking radicals.

Editorial offices were established at 6 Park Place in New York City, in a building subsequently removed and replaced by the massive Woolworth Building. Veteran journalist George Gordon was named the first editor of the publication and former Socialist Party Executive Secretary William Mailly the paper's managing editor. Other key members of the early editorial and writing staff included W. J. Ghent, Louis Kopelin, and Algernon Lee. At the end of October 1908, nationally famous muckraking journalist Charles Edward Russell was brought aboard as associate editor, having recently joined the Socialist Party.

The Call became the second English-language socialist daily in America, following the Chicago Daily Socialist, established in 1906, but preceding the long-running Milwaukee Leader, which launched in 1911.

The daily papers of the Socialist Party were dominated ideologically by the organization's dominant "constructive socialist" alliance, with the Chicago Daily Socialist in the hands of editor A. M. Simons, the Milwaukee Leader under the general editor control of party founder and U.S. Congressman Victor L. Berger, and the Call firmly in the hands of loyalists to Morris Hillquit. The party's revolutionary socialist Left Wing was left to find other vehicles for its ideas, such as the monthly magazine published by Charles H. Kerr, the International Socialist Review as well as a small handful of weekly papers.

Despite the Call's importance to the American socialist movement and to later historians of American radicalism as a "newspaper of record," the publication was never a circulation powerhouse in the vein of J.A. Wayland's Appeal to Reason. In 1916, with Socialist Party membership waning from its peak four years earlier, circulation of the New York Call stood at an unimpressive 15,000 copies per issue — less than half of the average circulation of the Milwaukee Leader.

Fundraising to support the cost of a daily newspaper proved an ongoing battle for New York City Socialists, with future member of the SPA's National Executive Committee Anna A. Maley given a full-time job as fundraiser for the publication. Throughout its history proved essential for the Call to raise additional operating revenue supplementary to the funds generated by newsstand sales and advertising.

=== Key content ("Jimmie Higgins") ===
The Call was very much a New York City newspaper, featuring news of the city and the world at the front of the paper, editorial comment and news of party affairs towards the back. The paper featured a "Women's Department" overseen by the high-profile activist wife of a "millionaire Socialist," Rose Pastor Stokes. Editorial cartoons were given a prominent place, with material contributed by Ryan Walker and others.

One of the contributions to the paper of lasting impact was a short story written by New York Socialist Ben Hanford in 1909, at a time when he was dying of cancer. The story, "Jimmie Higgins," was a salute to the rank-and-file Socialist everyman, a committed volunteer who loyally performed the myriad of unpublicized and unglamorous laborious tasks that were essential to the successful functioning of any political organization. The Higgins character proved enduring, being further immortalized in a 1919 novel by Upton Sinclair, Jimmie Higgins: A Story. Whittaker Chambers refers to himself using that term in his 1952 memoir:

One day, shortly after we had met, Sam Krieger proposed that I should do "Jimmie Higgins work." He explained to me patiently that Jimmie Higgins is a character in one of Upton Sinclair's novels or stories with a passion for lowly jobs. I shared no such passion, but I readily agreed, for I wanted to know the party from the ground up. I began with the Daily Worker, but not on its editorial staff... He set me to doing the task that nobody else would do— newsstand collections for the Daily Worker.

The Call also provided substantial original coverage of various labor disputes, such as the New York shirtwaist strike of 1909 and disasters such as the Triangle Shirtwaist Factory fire of 1911.

=== Opposition to World War I ===
In April 1917, President Woodrow Wilson, who had recently won re-election to a second four-year term of office behind the slogan "He Kept Us Out of War", asked Congress for a declaration of war against imperial Germany. That same month, with emotions running high, elected delegates of the Socialist Party of America gathered at their 1917 Emergency National Convention to determine party policy on the war. The organization reaffirmed its staunchly anti-militarist stance, declaring its opposition to the European war and American participation in it.

In June 1917, as part of the move of the United States government to military conscription, so-called "Espionage Act" legislation was passed making the obstruction of military recruitment a crime. Mere opposition to the American war effort via public speech or the printed word was interpreted by the Wilson Administration, and affirmed by the courts, as a violation of the law and a wave of prosecutions and administrative actions followed, including action by Postmaster General Albert S. Burleson to ban offending newspapers from the mail. Mailing privileges of the New York Call were quickly revoked as part of a general offensive against the Socialist Party's press.

Charles Ervin, managing editor of the Call during this period, decided that, beginning on Monday, December 3, 1917, the paper would be printed in the evenings and would handle its own distribution. The paper continued to be distributed outside of New York by first class mail at this time. At a meeting announcing the decision, Ervin was asked about the paper's attitude towards the U. S. Government and the war. He said that his criticism of the war was not to be understood as criticism of the government. In particular, Ervin told a New York Times reporter that:

I have always attacked Kaiserism. I attacked the German Kaiser and his militarism in 1913 when The New York Times was praising him. I am not a pacifist. I am a fighter, and my ancestors fought in the civil war. Just now, however, I believe it most important for me personally to fight capitalism and Kaiserism in this country.

The Call was forced to make do for the duration of the war primarily with door-to-door sales by carriers and at newsstands. The paper did not have its second-class mailing privileges restored until June 1921.

=== Response to the Russian Revolution of 1917 ===
With the advent of the Bolshevik Revolution in the fall of 1917, the Call was taken by surprise. On December 26, 1917, the paper editorialized that events in Russia had "got clean away from us" and that the editors could "make nothing of it at present, nor predicate anything for its future from present reports." The paper made its columns available both to supporters and critics of the Bolsheviks in Soviet Russia, but were generally supportive of the Russian Revolution in its earliest phase. As with The Jewish Daily Forward, later a bastion of anti-communism in the Socialist Party, The Call was not severely critical of V.I. Lenin, Leon Trotsky and their regime until after the end of the Russian Civil War and the destruction of the internal left wing political opposition in 1921.

As historian Theodore Draper noted:

"Many months after it happened, the Bolshevik revolution was still a very hazy and contradictory phenomenon. It was not simple and clear even to the participants. In its first stage, the Bolshevik regime consisted of a coalition between the Bolsheviks, the Left Socialist Revolutionaries, and minor groups. Long-time Marxists and anarchists pulled together against the common enemy...

"Thus it was possible for the American Left Wing to see the Bolshevik revolution in its own image. It could make itself believe that the Soviets were merely Russian equivalents of 'industrial socialism' or 'industrial unionism'..."

Only in its last years, well after the 1919 departure of the Left Wing Section of the Socialist Party to establish the nascent American Communist movement, would the Call become consistently critical of the excesses of the Russian Communist Party.

=== Termination and legacy ===
By the early 1920s the Socialist Party was in severe membership decline and funding of the New York Call became correspondingly tenuous. In a last-ditch effort to save the paper, it was reorganized in the fall of 1923 to include non-Socialists in its management. On October 1, 1923, the name of the paper was formally changed to the New York Leader as a reflection of this new orientation and pacifist minister Norman Thomas, formerly of The World Tomorrow, was named as editor of the publication. Heber Blankenhorn became managing editor, Evans Clark business manager, and Ed Sullivan sportswriter. This effort to stabilize the daily newspaper's funding was unsuccessful, however, and the New York Leader was terminated just six weeks later.

New York socialists, facing the prospect of no English-language paper in the city for the first time in more than three decades immediately met and made plans for a new weekly, to be called The New Leader in memory of the recently terminated daily. James Oneal, a former member of the New York Call staff, was made editor of this new publication.

A complete run of the New York Call is available via master negative microfilm from the New York Public Library in New York City.

The papers of the Workingmen's Co-operative Publishing Association are held by the Tamiment Library of New York University in two archival boxes. The material is open for the use of researchers without restriction.

== See also ==
- Socialist Party of America
- Non-English press of the Socialist Party of America
- English-language press of the Socialist Party of America
