= American Alliance for Labor and Democracy =

- President: Samuel Gompers
- Founded: September 1917
- Dissolved: November 1919
- Ideology: Pro-war patriotism
- Political position: Center-left

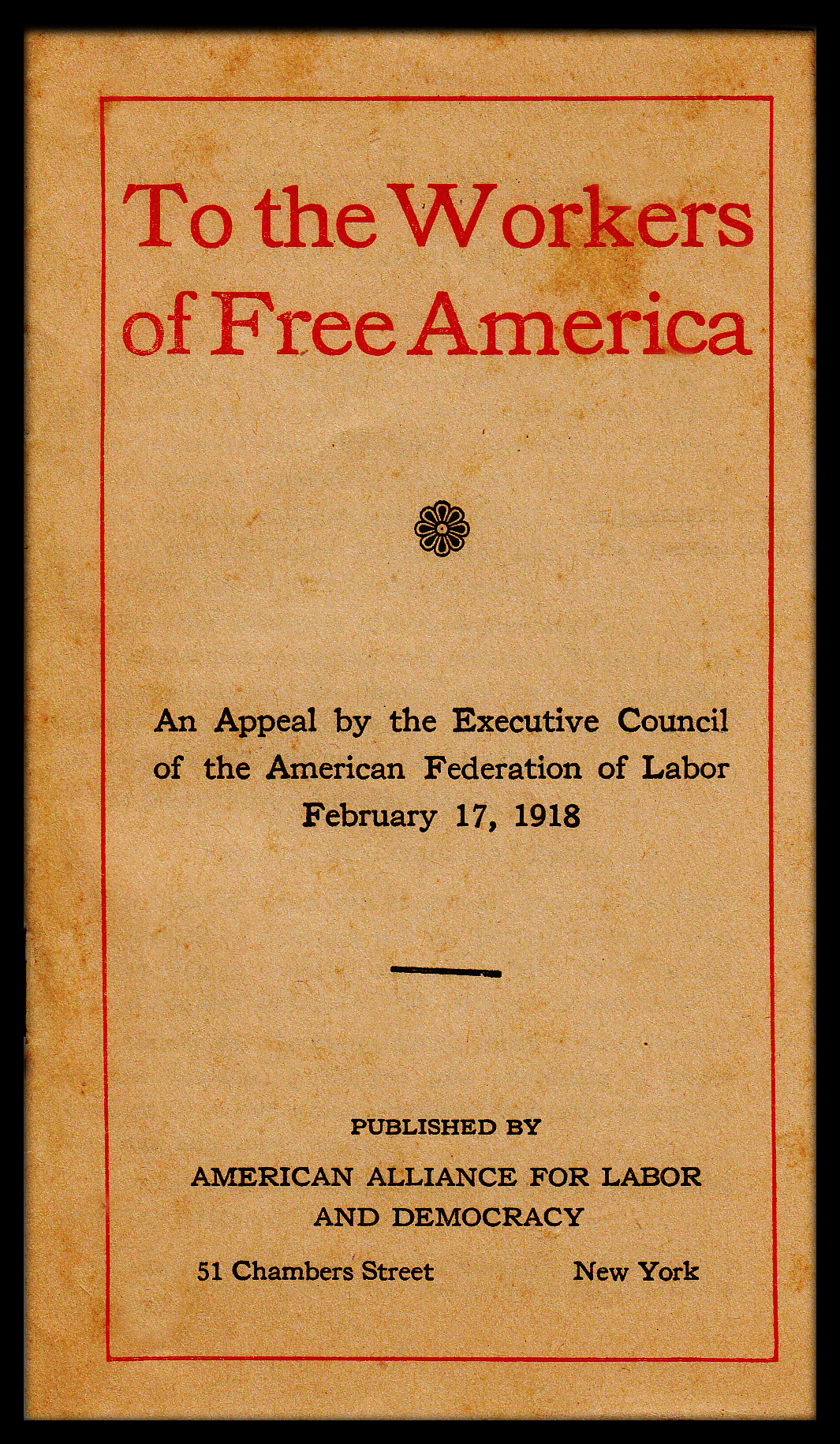
Cover of a 1918 pamphlet published by the American Alliance for Labor and Democracy.

The American Alliance for Labor and Democracy was an American political organization established in September 1917 through the initiative of the American Federation of Labor and making use of the resources of the United States government's Committee on Public Information. The group was dedicated to building support among American workers for that nation's participation in World War I in Europe. Following the victory of the Entente powers over the empires of Germany and Austria-Hungary the organization lost its raison d'être. It was finally terminated in November 1919 due to a lack of funding.

== Organizational history ==
=== Establishment ===
According to long-time President of the American Federation of Labor Samuel Gompers, the American Alliance for Labor and Democracy began as a reaction to the 1917 Emergency National Convention of the Socialist Party of America held in St. Louis, Missouri. At this gathering a convincing majority of the party's 200 assembled delegates voted in favor of a manifesto known to posterity as the St. Louis Resolution which branded President Woodrow Wilson's decision to enter World War I as "a crime against the people of the United States and against the nations of the world" and called for "continuous, active, and public opposition to the war" and "vigorous resistance to all reactionary measures."

Gompers was incensed at the Socialists' "declaration in support of internationalism and pacifism," which he regarded as "tantamount to avowed hostility to the cause of the Allies" and set about establishing a new organization to provide "intellectual guidance" to thousands of working class Americans disaffected by the Socialists' anti-militarist orientation.

Gompers later recalled:

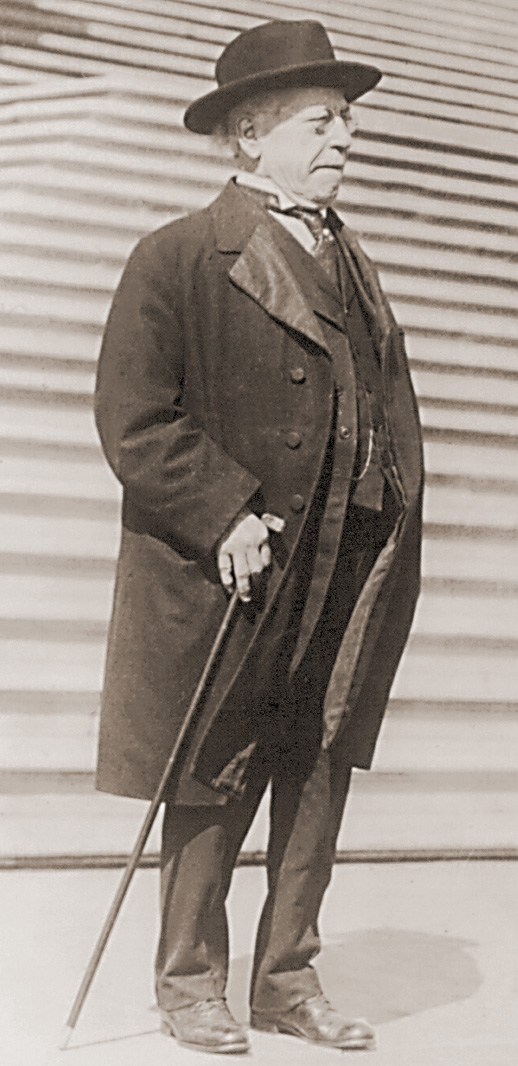
Samuel Gompers, President of the American Federation of Labor and founder of the American Alliance for Labor and Democracy.

"We developed a plan for bringing together in one organization representatives of the American trade union movement and representatives of what were known as radical organizations. Members of this organization agreed to lay aside for the period of the War whatever differences they might have upon procedure and to rally in defense of the fundamental principles for which our government stood. This organization we called the American Alliance for Labor and Democracy."

Gompers submitted his proposal to the Wilson administration for approval, getting the green light from the Council of National Defense and from the Committee on Public Information headed by George Creel. The latter organization was so taken by the idea that it came to make the American Alliance for Labor and Democracy one of the primary unofficial agencies through which the Committee on Public Information operated.

Preliminary organization of the AALD took place at a meeting held on July 28, 1917, at the Continental Hotel in New York City attended by prominent pro-war socialists John Spargo, Robert Maisel, and J. Graham Phelps Stokes. At this meeting Gompers was named the president of the AALD and Maisel its director.

=== Development ===
One of the left wing pacifist organizations to which Gompers and his associates were particularly opposed was the People's Council of America for Democracy and Peace, a national organization established at a mass meeting of 20,000 people held at Madison Square Garden in May 1917. The People's Council maintained a New York City branch called the Workingmen's Council which announced its intention to militantly defend the wages and interests of the working class during the war, which was interpreted by Gompers as a direct challenge to his and the AF of L's decision to collaborate and cooperate with the government during wartime.

When Gompers learned that the People's Council planned a national conference of the organization to be held in St. Paul, Minnesota, in September 1917 which was to be "truly representative of labor," Gompers responded by launching a counter-convention of his own, calling for a national conference of the American Alliance for Labor and Democracy to be held in the same city at the same time. George Creel of the Committee on Public Information set to work stifling the ability of the People's Council to hold a convention anywhere, writing to one Minnesota correspondent that the anti-militarist organization was composed of "traitors and fools" and encouraging him to mobilize conservative civic organizations to pass resolutions against the People's Council and to directly meet with newspaper editors on the matter.

On August 28, less than a week prior to the scheduled start of the People's Council's convention, Governor Joseph Burquist of Minnesota prohibited the meeting of the People's Council on the grounds that it would give aid and comfort to the enemies of the United States. A subsequent effort to hold a convention in Chicago was broken up by the police. When Chicago Mayor "Big Bill" Thompson attempted to intervene, declaring that "pacifists are law-abiding citizens" and that he would not "have it spread broadcast that Chicago denies free speech to anyone," Illinois Governor Frank Lowden mobilized the Illinois National Guard, sending four companies of troops to Chicago the next day to make sure that the People's Council could not meet.

As outspoken cheerleaders for American action in the European war, Gompers and the American Alliance for Labor and Democracy had no such problems with government authorities. Their convention went forward without a hitch, meeting as scheduled in Minneapolis from September 5 to 7, 1917.

Gompers attempted to gain the official endorsement for the American Alliance for Labor and Democracy at the November 1917 annual convention of the American Federation of Labor. The proposal prompted a bitter debate, with critics questioning the appropriateness of a labor organization's endorsement of an organization which promoted labor loyalty to the government. Others spoke out in criticism of the Wilson administration's suspension of civil liberties during wartime. Ultimately, however, the assembled delegates representing the AF of L unions voted by a wide margin to officially endorse the activities of the AALD.

Triumph at the 1917 AF of L convention did not mean that the American Alliance was universally beloved among labor leaders, however. President of the Chicago Federation of Labor John Fitzpatrick developed concerns about the repressive nature of the AALD and its propensity to engage in covert activities and managed to successfully stall the creation of a Chicago chapter of the group. Fitzpatrick brazenly dodged an order by AF of L officials to establish an AALD branch in the city and ignored all correspondence directed to him from the organization's New York headquarters. A bitter exchange of letters between Fitzpatrick and AALD secretary Robert Maisel followed, with Fitzpatrick standing his ground. Ultimately the clock ran out on the war and the American Alliance was forced to abandon its plans for a Chicago chapter.

=== Activities ===
The American Alliance for Labor and Democracy maintained national headquarters at 51 Chambers Street in New York City.

The organization sponsored a speakers' bureau which organized public meetings around the United States. Included among these was a delegation of four British labor leaders who were brought over and toured around America in an attempt to build support for the war effort among union members. The group also served as a conduit for information to labor newspapers from the Committee on Public Information.

In honor of the birthday of Abraham Lincoln, the AALD declared the week of February 10 to be "Labor Loyalty Week," and organized a campaign directed at the American labor movement for the organization of mass meetings and public demonstrations in support of the war effort. Director of the AALD, Robert Maisel, declared that "we plan to make this loyalty week demonstration one of the most powerful blows yet dealt at enemy propaganda in America."

The American Alliance also published and circulated a number of printed pamphlets targeted to the American working class attempting to build support for the war effort and denigrating the position of the German socialist movement in support of their own country's war effort.

The Alliance established membership chapters around the country to bring national activities to the local level, groups which engaged in such activities in the sale of government bonds as part of the various Liberty Loans campaigns.

=== Dissolution and legacy ===
Following the victory of the Entente powers in World War I in November 1918, the work of the American Alliance for Labor and Democracy drew near an end. Congressional funding of the Committee on Public Information was slashed and the AALD was forced to scramble for new revenue, receiving an infusion of funds from the American Federation of Labor. However, by November 1919 funds had dried up and the organization was disbanded.

Papers related to the American Alliance for Labor and Democracy and the People's Council of America may be found in the Frank Leslie Grubbs collection, housed at the Hoover Institution archives at Stanford University in Palo Alto, California. The collection includes one folder of material and ten reels of microfilm gathering correspondence, minutes, and printed publications.

== Prominent members ==
- John R. Commons
- James Duncan
- John Fitzpatrick
- John P. Frey
- Gertrude B. Fuller
- Winfield R. Gaylord
- William J. Ghent
- Samuel Gompers
- James P. Holland
- Robert Maisel
- Charlotte Perkins
- Charles Edward Russell
- Lucien Sanial
- John Spargo
- Graham Phelps Stokes
- William English Walling
- Frank P. Walsh
- J. Stitt Wilson
- Matthew Woll

== See also ==
- Social Democratic League of America
- National Party
- Committee on Public Information
- People's Council of America for Democracy and Peace

== Publications ==
- American Alliance for Labor and Democracy, Declaration of Principles: Adopted Unanimously by the American Alliance for Labor and Democracy in First National Conference at Minneapolis, Minn., Sept. 5 to 7, 1917. New York: American Alliance for Labor and Democracy, 1917.
- American Alliance for Labor and Democracy, Purposes and Principles of the American Alliance for Labor and Democracy. New York: American Alliance for Labor and Democracy, 1917.
- American Alliance for Labor and Democracy, Red, White and Blue Book of the American Labor Movement: Organized Labor's Record in Relation to the War as Shown in the Official Documents. New York: American Alliance for Labor and Democracy, n.d. [c. 1918].
- American Federation of Labor, To the Workers of Free America: An Appeal by the Executive Council of the American Federation of Labor, February 17, 1918. New York: American Alliance for Labor and Democracy, 1918.
- Samuel Gompers, America's Fight for the Preservation of Democracy: An Address Delivered by Samuel Gompers at Minneapolis, Minn.: And the Declaration of Principles. New York: American Alliance for Labor and Democracy, 1917.
- John R. Commons, German Socialists and the War. New York: American Alliance for Labor and Democracy, n.d. [c. 1918].
- John R. Commons, Who is Paying for this War? New York: American Alliance for Labor and Democracy, n.d. [c. 1918].
- John R. Commons, Why Working Men Support the War.' New York: American Alliance for Labor and Democracy, n.d. [c. 1918].
- League to Enforce the Peace, Why the War Must Be Won: To Fulfill President Wilson's Program of the World's Peace; To Realize the War Aims of Organized Labor; To Perpetuate a League of Nations to Guard the Peace and Safety of the World. New York: American Alliance for Labor and Democracy, 1918.
- John Spargo, Our Aims in the War: An Address Delivered by John Spargo at Minneapolis, Minn., September 5, 1917 under the Auspices of the American Alliance for Labor and Democracy. New York: American Alliance for Labor and Democracy, 1917.
- American Alliance for Labor and Democracy; Woodrow Wilson contrib., Our War Aims Clearly Stated: Being a Reply to Those Who Demand that the President of the United States Make a Clear Statement of Our Aims in the War. New York: American Alliance for Labor and Democracy, 1917.
