= John Spargo =

British political activist (1876–1966)

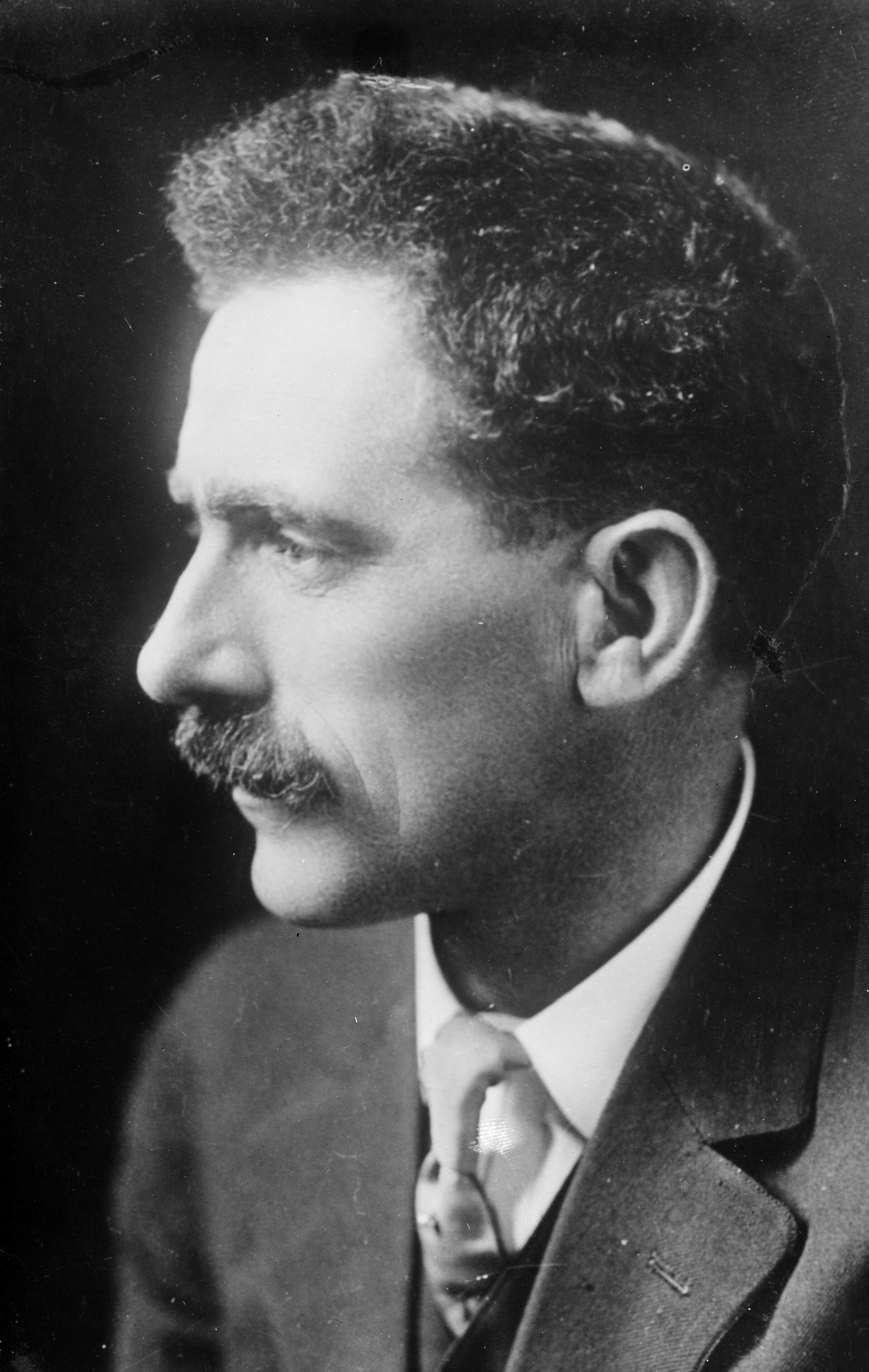
John Spargo, c. 1917

John Spargo (January 31, 1876 – August 17, 1966) was a British political writer who, later in life, became an expert in the history and crafts of Vermont. At first Spargo was active in the Socialist Party of America. A Methodist preacher, he tried to meld the Protestant Social Gospel with Marxist socialism in Marxian Socialism and Religion: A Study of the Relation of the Marxian Theories to the Fundamental Principles of Religion (1915). He also founded a settlement house in Yonkers, New York.

Spargo moved steadily to the right after 1917 when he supported American intervention in World War I. With the American Federation of Labor leader Samuel Gompers he organized the American Alliance for Labor and Democracy in 1917. Spargo helped draft the Colby Note that formalised the Wilson administration's anti-communist policies. He strongly denounced the Bolshevik Revolution in Bolshevism: The Enemy of Political and Industrial Democracy (1919). He opposed the foreign policy of the New Deal, especially its recognition of the USSR in 1933. He supported the House Un-American Activities Committee in the late 1930s and Senator Joseph McCarthy in the early 1950s. He endorsed Barry Goldwater In the 1964 Elections.

== Biography ==
=== Early years ===
Spargo was born on January 31, 1876, in the small village of Longdowns in the parish of Stithians, Cornwall, England. His parents were Thomas Spargo (1850–1920) and Jane Hocking Spargo (1851–1900), whose maiden name was also Spargo. As a young man, He trained as a stonecutter, and he later became a lay Methodist minister. He was attracted to the socialist doctrines of early English Marxist Henry Hyndman, particularly to his book England for All.

Spargo was a largely self-educated man, but he did in 1894-95 take two courses through the Oxford University Extension Program, including one by economist J. A. Hobson. Spargo went to work in 1895, moving with his alcoholic father to Barry Docks in South Wales, where he was employed as a stonemason. Within a year after his arrival at Barry Dock, Spargo had started the first local of Hyndman's Social Democratic Federation (SDF), was elected president of the Barry Trades and Labour Council, became an editor of the Barry Herald, and was elected a member of the National Executive Committee of the SDF.

As his biographer notes

It was an amazing, meteoric progression for an uneducated stonemason from Western Cornwall that took place in these few years of Spargo's education in Marxism; by the end of his residence in Britain, the 25-year-old was recognized as one of the most promising and energetic Marxist agitators in the country. Through it all, he was guided, inspired, and sustained by the Social Democratic Federation's founder and leader, Henry Meyers Hyndman, the man whose England for All had converted him to Marxism and who for the rest of his life would remain Spargo's model, mentor, and friend.

Spargo's political ideas in this early period were an amalgam of Christian Socialism and Marxism, simultaneously seeking the brotherhood of man by following "the true principles of the man of Galillee," while embracing science and the belief in the rule of the working class as the motive force to create social change.

In January 1900, Spargo married Prudence Edwards, a clerk from Lancashire, England who shared her new husband's socialist politics. The couple had one son, named after Christian Socialist leader George D. Herron.

In 1900, Spargo participated in some of the preliminary meetings which brought together representatives of the SDF, the Independent Labour Party, the Fabian Society, and various trade unions and cooperative societies to form the Labour Parliamentary Representation Committee, a direct forerunner of the British Labour Party. This drive of the SDF to unite with various non-Marxist organizations brought about an immediate reaction from the party's hardline "impossibilist" left wing, who sought revolutionary transformation rather than incremental, piecemeal parliamentary reforms. The rise of the left caused Hyndman to temporarily leave the SDF's executive council and alienated Spargo to some extent from the party. Providentially, Spargo received at this time an invitation from the private lecture bureau to travel to America to spend a couple months traveling the country, speaking about socialism. And so the newlyweds sailed for America and ultimately a new life there.

=== Coming to America ===
John and Prudence Spargo arrived at the port of New York in February 1901. The promised lecture series proved to be vastly exaggerated and Spargo wound up standing in bread lines to get food and shoveling snow from the sidewalks of the city for $7.50 a week. Eventually a few socialist lectures did come and Spargo made the acquaintance of many leading radicals in the city, including Christian Socialist George D. Herron, Job Harriman, and Algernon Lee. Spargo cast his lot with the dissident (and newly independent wing of the Socialist Labor Party headed by Henry Slobodin and Morris Hillquit), teaching at an SLP education center in Brooklyn, and working as an assistant to the lawyer Hillquit.

Spargo also assumed the role of editor of an illustrated socialist monthly based in New York, The Comrade. The Spargos spent the next eight years living in a small apartment on the Lower East Side of Manhattan, with Spargo spending much of his time traveling the country as a paid lecturer. When the New York SLP dissidents merged with the midwestern Social Democratic Party of America headed by Victor L. Berger and Eugene Debs to establish the Socialist Party of America (SPA), Spargo was a founding member — although he was not in attendance at the Indianapolis Convention which established the organization in the summer of 1901.

Spargo c. 1902

With regard to his travels on behalf of the American socialist movement as a lecturer, Spargo's biographer notes

It was well known that on many of his trips Spargo cavorted with a number of attractive ladies, and he quickly built a reputation not just as an effective socialist organizer but as a womanizer of some note... There was nothing unusual in this since the early-20th century intellectuals who crowded New York's socialist circles tended to embrace free love as an indispensable dimension of their newfound aesthetics. In Spargo's case, however, the sexual cavorting led to some tricky situations, and once he had to borrow some 200 dollars from Hillquit to pay off a blackmailer who knew too much of some compromising tryst.

Spargo continued as editor of The Comrade until April 1904. In May of that same year, he traveled to Chicago and attended the second convention of the Socialist Party as a delegate from New York. At the convention, Spargo was elected Chairman of the Resolutions Committee and he reported as such to the conclave. Among other topics, the committee passed resolutions attacking the payment of "exorbitant fees or salaries" of socialist speakers and lecturers and condemning "all propaganda organizations, not connected with the Socialist Party, doing Socialist propaganda" and declaring membership in any such organization to be "sufficient cause for expulsion" from the SPA.

Spargo also took to the floor of the convention in opposition to the establishment of a national party-owned newspaper, a demand put forward by delegates from the left-wing state organizations of the Pacific Coast but regarded as anathema by moderate Easterners who had fairly recently defected from the centralized Socialist Labor Party dominated by party editor Daniel DeLeon. Spargo declared

I am opposed to a national party-owned organ because I am opposed to the heresy hunter all the time. (Applause.) I am opposed to a national party-owned organ because I will not trust the party integrity, I will not trust the party interests, I will not trust the party faith to the judgment of any one man, no matter how great he may be. (Applause.) If Editor Wayland, of the Appeal to Reason, makes a mistake, the Socialist Party stands firm, but if somebody who is declared to be for the time being the infallible literary pope of the movement makes a mistake, that mistake carries with it the Socialist Party. (Applause.)

Spargo's position won the day at the 1904 Socialist Party convention and it was not until 1914 until the organization finally established a party-owned weekly newspaper.

Spargo's first wife, Prudence, died of tuberculosis in March 1904. A year and 10 days later, he married Amelia Rose Bennetts, a British-born New York socialist who had lived in America from early childhood and who had recently been employed as a worker in a carpet mill. The couple set up house in Yonkers, New York, and had two children, a daughter named Mary and a son, who died in childhood, named John Jr.

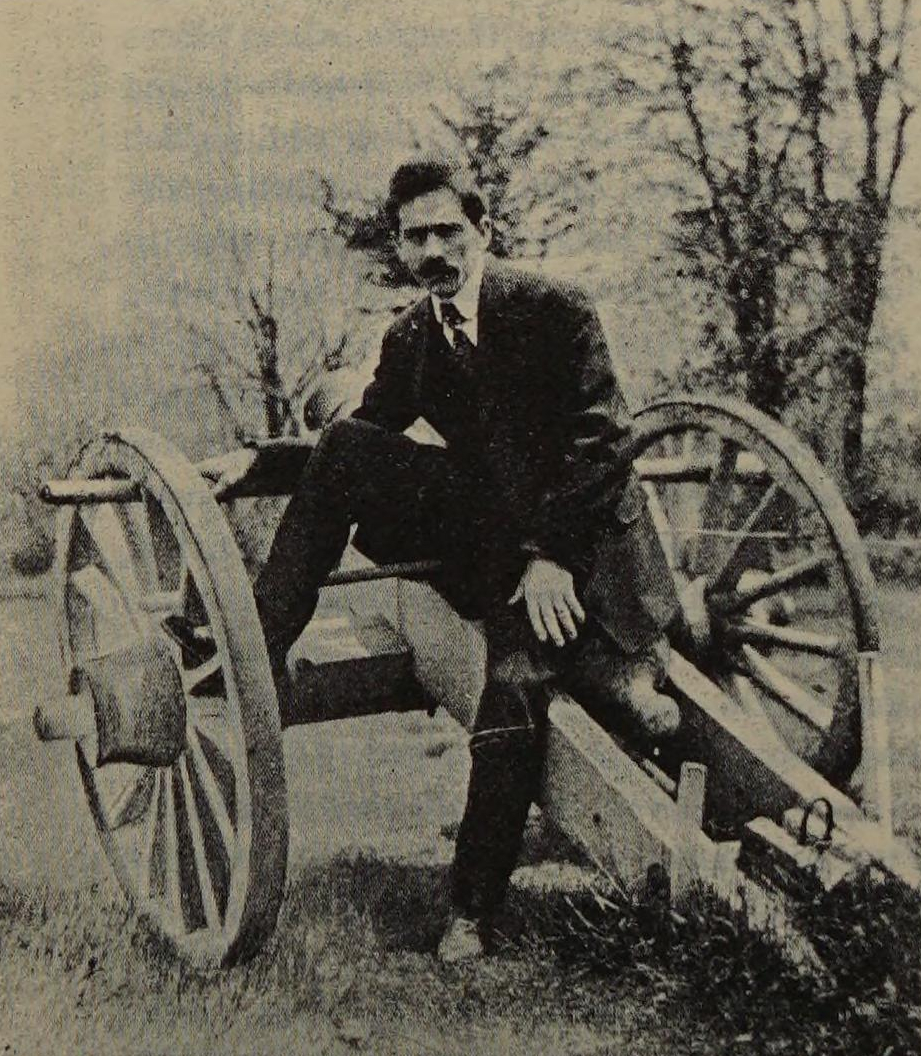
Spargo c. August 1909

Spargo was elected to the National Committee of the Socialist Party in 1905 and to the governing National Executive Committee in 1909. As his biographer notes, during this period Spargo began "easing his way toward the reformist right-wing" of the SPA, giving up on the tactic of agitation among striking workers in favor of building middle class socialist educational institutions. Spargo was instrumental in helping establish the Rand School of Social Science, persuading George D. Herron and his wife Carrie Rand Herron to make a large bequest and Mrs. Herron's mother to provide seed money for the new institution. Spargo also was a co-founder of the Intercollegiate Socialist Society (ISS), an organization dedicated to the establishment of non-partisan socialist study groups on college campuses and sponsoring debates and lectures on socialist topics. Spargo would later serve on the ISS executive from 1916 to 1919.

Spargo wrote a series of compassionate, well-researched books, The Bitter Cry of the Children (1906), Underfed School Children (1906), and The Common Sense of the Milk Question (1908). All three concerned child slavery in British and American factories and argued for the state-funded feeding of underprivileged children on the grounds that it was pointless attempting to teach children distracted by hunger, a concept that very successfully came into fruition in America during World War II.

He felt deeply about the issue, later writing that:

The claim for an equal chance for every child born into the world carries with it that most fundamental of claims, that every child has a right to be well-born into the world. And that ideal can never be realized until every mother-to-be is safeguarded by all the arts and resources of our civilization to the end that she may bring her baby into the world with joy–healthy of body, glad of heart, serene of soul, unafraid of the future, unterrified by want or the fear of it, secure in the consciousness that the child she bears is heir to all the riches and advantages of earth.

In 1908, Spargo authored a lengthy and academically serious biography of Karl Marx, his book being recognized as the best such treatment published in the English language at the time.

The same year, Spargo was elected as a delegate to the 1908 National Convention of the Socialist Party, held again at Chicago. Spargo was returned by the convention to the post he had held at the previous national gathering, Chairman of the Resolutions Committee. Spargo was influential in defeating through parliamentary procedure a resolution moved by a majority of the Resolutions Committee calling for the future exclusion of Asian workers from America. Spargo's opposition to the resolution was based upon the principle of state autonomy of local parties rather than upon internationalism and the social equality of the races:

Comrades, I ask you to vote that we are a party of the working class, that it is the economic interest of the working class which must guide our party, that we leave it to the states themselves to decide if they have an Asiatic problem. They can decide it upon the basis of local state autonomy, and, above all, I ask that you recognize that the immigration problem is a big problem, a complex problem...

=== Factional politics of the early 1910's ===
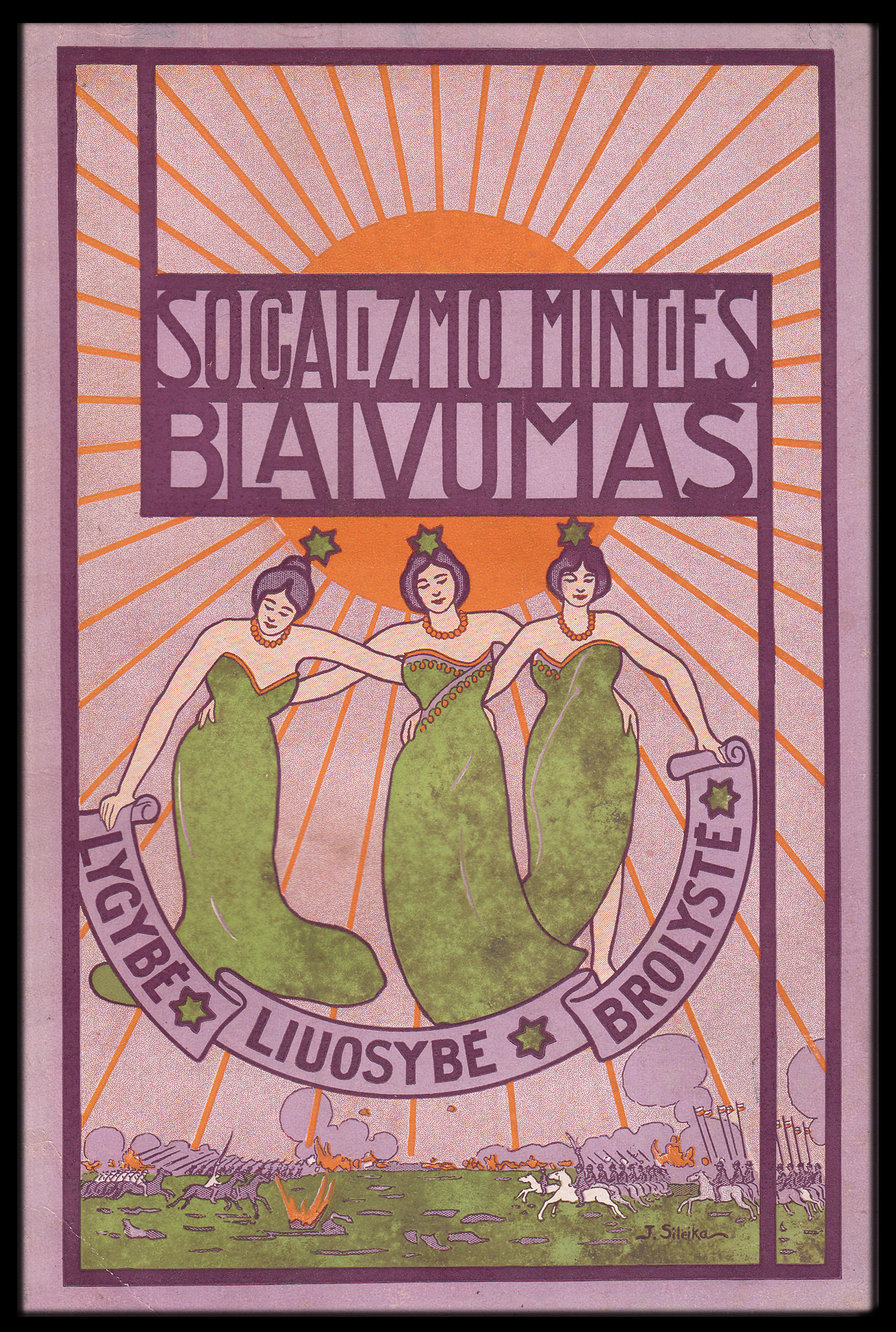
Cover of Spargo's The Common Sense of Socialism, as published by the Lithuanian Socialist Federation of the SPA in 1916

During the years 1909 to 1914, Spargo continued his reconsideration of socialist theory and practice and emerged as a top leader of the Socialist Party's right wing. He was diagnosed with a heart ailment and suffered from a lung infection which claimed the life of his younger son, so the Spargos moved to a new home in the hamlet of Old Bennington, Vermont, close to the New York border in the southwestern corner of the state. There the ailing Spargo recovered from his illness and was soon back on the road lecturing on socialist themes.

Along with, incidentally, Industrial Workers of the World leader "Big Bill" Haywood, Spargo was one of 24 delegates of the Socialist Party to the 1910 Congress of the International, held in Copenhagen, Denmark, from August 28 to September 4, 1910. The gathering discussed matters relating to international relations between socialist parties, the trade union movement, disarmament, and the progress of labor legislation in the various countries.

Spargo was a bitter opponent of the syndicalism which was sweeping parts of the Socialist Party and staunchly supported the established craft unionism of the American Federation of Labor against the radical industrial unionism of the Industrial Workers of the World (IWW). A battle royal between the dominant center-right coalition that controlled the Socialist Party and its pro-syndicalist left wing erupted in 1912. As Spargo's biographer notes:

Throughout, the faction fight was about much more than just a struggle for power. To Spargo and his fellow right-wingers, it subsumed under its rubric the larger question of where and how the socialist movement was headed, that is, whether it was to be led by those schooled in theoretical Marxian exegesis and historical study or by those who discarded such exegesis and study and opted instead for direct catastrophic action.

The brewing skirmish erupted into an open fight at the 1912 National Convention of the Socialist Party, to which Spargo was once again a delegate from New York as well as the elected Chairman of the Resolutions Committee. At issue was language to be inserted into the party constitution which called for the expulsion of "any member of the party who opposes political action or advocates crime, sabotage, or other methods of violence as a weapon of the working class to aid in its emancipation." The debate was vitriolic, with Victor L. Berger of Wisconsin stating the matter in its most bellicose form:

Comrades, the trouble with our party is that we have men in our councils who claim to be in favor of political action when they are not. We have a number of men who use our political organization—our Socialist Party—as a cloak for what they call direct action, for IWW-ism, sabotage and syndicalism. It is anarchism by a new name....

Comrades, I have gone through a number of splits in this party. It was not always a fight against anarchism in the past. In the past we often had to fight Utopianism and fanaticism. Now it is anarchism again that is eating away at the vitals of our party.

If there is to be a parting of the ways, if there is to be a split—and it seems that you will have it, and must have it—then, I am ready to split right here. I am ready to go back to Milwaukee and appeal to the Socialists all over the country to cut this cancer out of our organization.

Spargo played a leading role in this purge of the party's left wing with his 1913 book entitled Syndicalism, Industrial Unionism and Socialism, an attack on the syndicalism of the IWW and its supporters. Spargo charged that the IWW's tactic of encouraging sabotage would have the effect of undermining the honor, courage, and self-respect of the working class, causing it to lose sight of the spiritual ideals of socialism. He held that the "IWW form of organization which denies autonomy to local unions and centralizes power in the hands of the executive, really involves the ideal of a bureaucratic government in the future society." For Spargo, the ideal of "one big union" meant in practice "authoritarianism and bureaucracy" and "the creation of a despotic industrial State in place of a political State." He asked his readers, "If all the unions are to be centralized in one big union and its power centralized in the hands of a single authority, can the government of society by that union be other than democratic?"

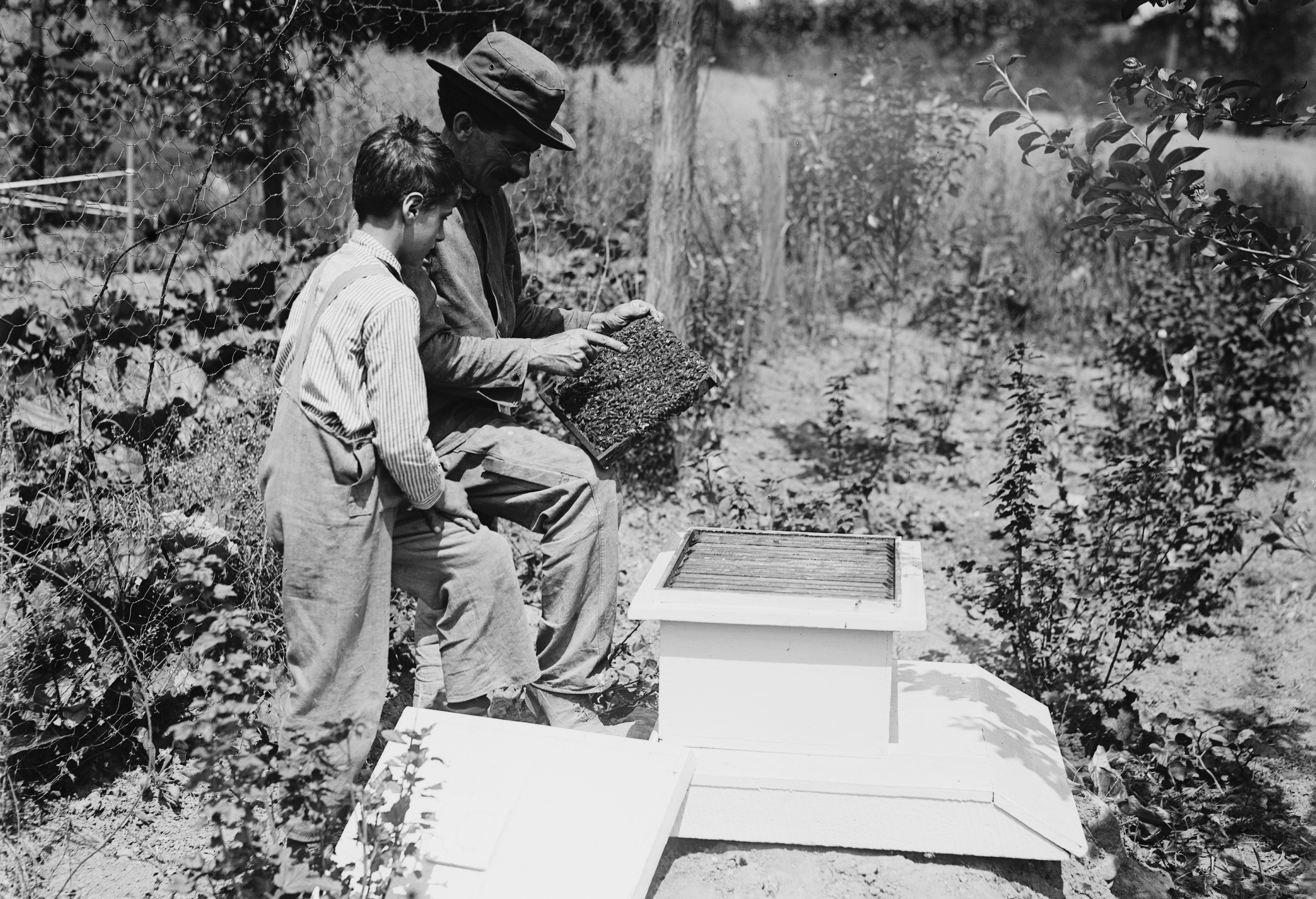
Spargo tends to bees with his son at their home in Bennington, Vermont, August 1914

While many adhering to the syndicalist and revolutionary socialist ideals of the SPA's left wing exited the party following their defeat at the 1912 National Convention and the successful recall of "Big Bill" Haywood from the party's National Executive Committee, there remained a strong radical current in the party, dissatisfied with the temporizing parliamentarism of the party majority. In the summer of 1914 would come an issue which would sweep the syndicalist controversy aside and fundamentally alter political discourse within the international socialist movement and the Socialist Party of America—the crisis of international war in Europe.

The year 1912 also marked Spargo's only foray into American electoral politics, when he ran for the United States Congress in the 1st Congressional District of Vermont as the nominee of the Socialist Party. Spargo received 456 votes, as opposed to the more than 3,000 that the victorious candidate received.

=== The war and after ===
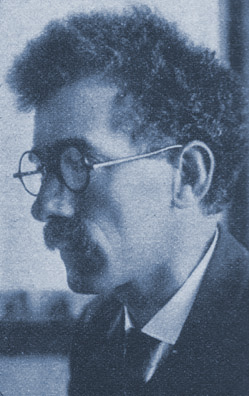
Spargo c. 1917

At the 1917 National Convention of the Socialist Party, Spargo was the author of a minority resolution in the Committee on War and Militarism calling for American support of the Allied war effort as the least onerous alternative facing the socialist movement. This proposal was decisively defeated, garnering the support of only 5 delegates, in favor of the militant St. Louis Resolution, which called for an active struggle against the American war effort. Up until the party voted to ratify the St. Louis Resolution, Spargo clung to the hope that a majority of the rank and file would endorse his own views of the European conflict. When, on the other hand, the party's membership enthusiastically endorsed the party's line established at the 1917 convention, Spargo decided to make a decisive exit from the organization. On May 30, 1917, he resigned his seat on the SP's governing National Executive Committee, followed three days later by his resignation from the party itself.

Spargo wrote to his former comrade Morris Hillquit, co-author of the St. Louis Resolution, that his resignation from the Socialist Party "probably means the end of practically everything. In the absence of any other Socialist organization in which I can function, I shall probably devote myself exclusively to my personal affairs and leave the political struggle alone."

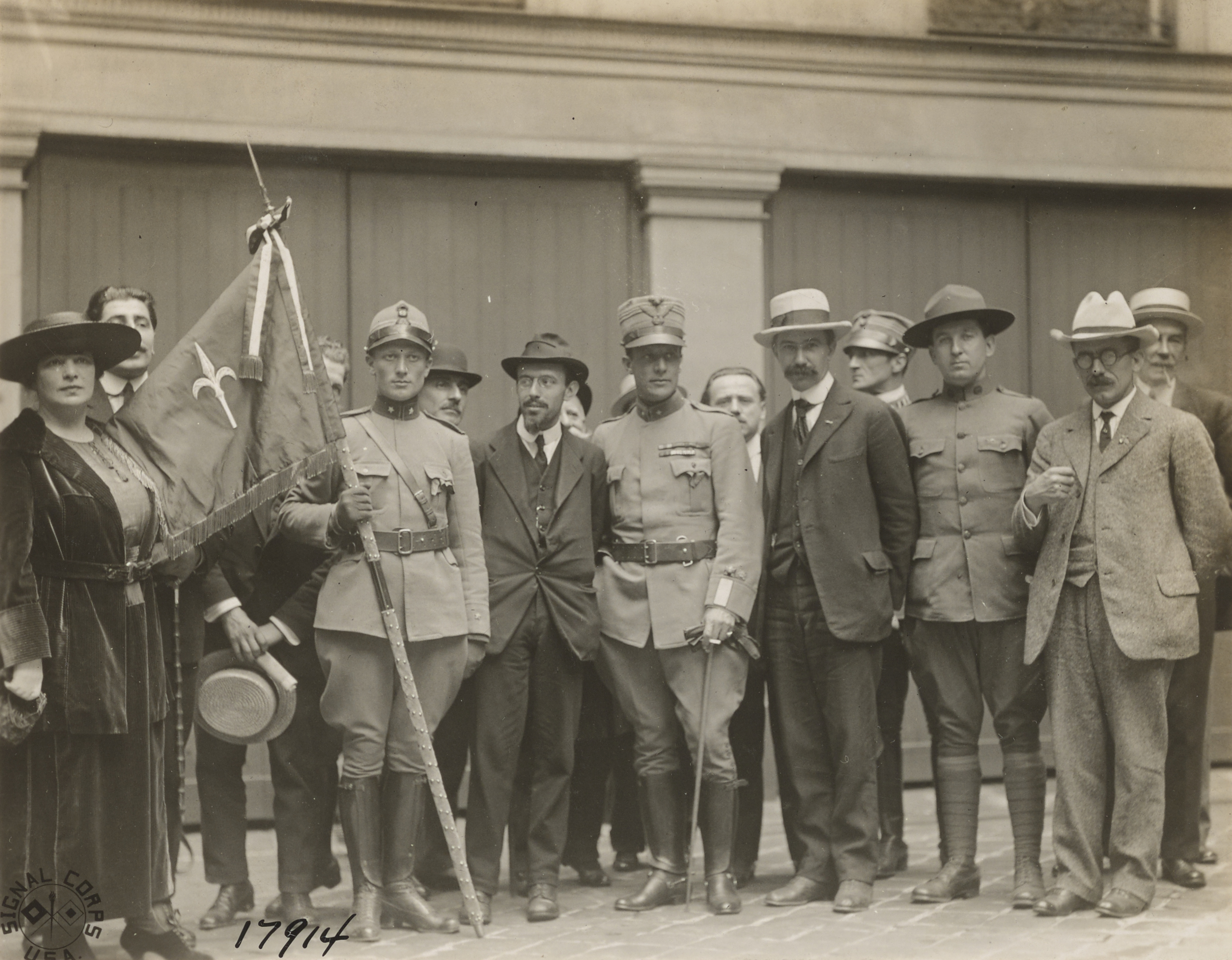
Spargo (front row, far right) with Algie Martin Simons (front row, third from right) at a socialist meeting in Paris, August 7, 1918

Spargo did not drop out of politics, however, choosing instead to actively endorse and collaborate with the Wilson administration in its war effort. He conceived of the US government-sponsored pro-war labor organization the American Alliance for Labor and Democracy, which together with Samuel Gompers of the AF of L he subsequently helped lead, and for which he occasionally wrote. Spargo also joined the Social Democratic League of America (SDL), a pro-war organization which emerged through the venerable socialist weekly, the Appeal to Reason — now named The New Appeal by its pro-war editors, Louis Kopelin and Emanuel Haldeman-Julius. Spargo was chosen as the first Chairman of the SDL, with Haldeman-Julius apparently handling the day-to-day operations of the organization through the offices of the Appeal in Girard, Kansas.

Spargo conceived of the SDL as a group akin to the Independent Labour Party in England and sought to involve it in a broader pro-war organization analogous to the British Labour Party. Spargo himself conceived of this broader group, the National Party, and sat on the Executive Committee of this new political organization. The National Party dissolved following disappointing returns in the elections of 1918.

By the middle 1920s, Spargo had turned away from leftist politics, developing his own theories of what he called "socialized individualism". He became a member of the Republican Party, supported Calvin Coolidge in the election of 1924, and was regarded as a prospective United States Secretary of Labor during the presidency of Herbert Hoover. His biographer characterized the change as that from a "Marxian socialist who became a Goldwater Republican and was throughout an American anti-communist.

Spargo became the director-curator of the Bennington, Vermont Historical Museum and wrote several books on ceramics.

He researched and wrote a booklet on the history of his family name. Spargo is also the name of the locality around Mabe Church in the parish of Mabe. He postulated that evidence supported the place name and Spargo family name being in existence c. 400 AD. This pre-dated the arrival by some 400 years of the Christian Church.

He died in Bennington, Vermont.

== Works ==
=== The socialist years ===
- A Socialist View of Mr. Rockefeller. Chicago: Charles H. Kerr, 1905.
- Forces That Make For Socialism in America. Chicago: Charles H. Kerr, 1905.
- The Bitter Cry of the Children. New York: Macmillan, 1906.
- Underfed School Children: The Problem and the Remedy. Chicago: Charles H. Kerr, 1906.
- Socialism: A Summary and Interpretation of Socialist Principles. New York: Macmillan, 1906.
- The Socialists: Who They Are and What they Stand For. Chicago: Charles H. Kerr, 1906.
- Capitalist and Laborer: An Open Letter to Professor Goldwin Smith, DCL, in Reply to his "Capital and Labor"; and Modern Socialism: A Lecture Delivered and the New York School of Philanthropy. Chicago: Charles H. Kerr, 1907.
- "Leon Dabo, Poet in Color." The Craftsman, December 1907.
- The Socialism of William Morris. Westwood, Mass.: Ariel Press, 1908.
- The Common Sense of Socialism: A Series of Letters Addressed to Jonathan Edwards, of Pittsburg. Chicago: Charles H. Kerr, 1908.
- The Common Sense of the Milk Question. New York: Macmillan, 1908.
- The Spiritual Significance of Modern Socialism. New York: B.W. Huebsch, 1908.
- Where We Stand: A Lecture Originally Delivered Under the Title, "Our Position: Economic, Ethical and Political". Chicago: Charles H. Kerr, n.d. [1908].
- The Substance of Socialism. New York: B.W. Huebsch, 1909.
- The Marx He Knew. Chicago: Charles H. Kerr, 1909.
- Karl Marx: His Life and Work. Manchester / New York: The National Labour Press Ltd. / B.W. Huebsch. 1910.
- The Socialists: Who They Are and What They Stand For. Chicago: Charles H. Kerr, 1910.
- Sidelights on Contemporary Socialism. New York: B.W. Huebsch, 1911.
- Elements of Socialism: A Text-Book (with George Arner). New York: Macmillan, 1912.
- Applied Socialism: A Study of the Application of Socialistic Principles to the State. New York: B.W. Huebsch, 1912.
- Syndicalism, Industrial Unionism and Socialism. New York: B.W. Huebsch, 1913.
- Socialism and Motherhood. New York: B.W. Huebsch, 1914.
- Marxian Socialism and Religion: A Study of the Relation of the Marxian Theories to the Fundamental Principles of Religion. New York: B.W. Huebsch, 1915.

=== The social democratic years ===
- Our Aims in the War: An Address Delivered by John Spargo at Minneapolis, Minn., September 5, 1917 under the Auspices of the American Alliance for Labor and Democracy. New York: American Alliance for Labor and Democracy, 1917.
- America's Democratic Opportunities: An Address Delivered before the City Club of Cleveland, October 6th, 1917: Being the First Public Exposition of the Principles of the National Party. Cleveland, OH: City Club of Cleveland, 1917.
- Social Democracy Explained: Theories and Tactics of Modern Socialism. New York: Harper, 1918.
- Americanism and Social Democracy. New York: Harper, 1918.
- "Russia and the World Problem of the Jew." Harper's Monthly Magazine, vol. 137, no. 817, June 1918, pp. 65-75.
- Bolshevism: The Enemy of Political and Industrial Democracy. New York: Harper, 1919.
- The Psychology of Bolshevism. New York: Harper and Brothers, 1919.
- "The Greatest Failure in All History": A Critical Examination of the Actual Workings of Bolshevism in Russia. New York: Harper, 1920.
- Russia as an American Problem. New York: Harper, 1920.
- The Jew and American Ideals. New York: Harper, 1921.
- A Memorandum on Trade with Soviet Russia. New York: Russian Information Bureau in the U.S., 1921.

=== Post-radical works ===
- Anthony Haswell: Printer — Patriot — Ballader: A Biographical Study with a Selection of his Ballads and an Annotated Bibliographical List of his Imprints. Rutland, VT: The Tuttle Co., 1925.
- Ethan Allen at Ticonderoga: An Address Delivered By Spargo At Castleton, Vermont May 9, 1925 At The 150th Anniversary Of The Green Mountain Boys Under Ethan Allen And Their Departure For Ticonderoga. (city, publisher, date?)
- Early American Pottery and China. Garden City, NY: The Century Co., 1926.
- Potters And Potteries of Bennington. Boston: Houghton Mifflin Company/Antiques Incorporated, 1926.
- The Stars and Stripes in 1777: An Account of the Birth of the Flag and its First Baptism of Victorious Fire. Bennington, VT: Bennington Battle Monument and Historical Association, 1928.
- The True Story of Capt. David Mathews and His State Line House: Being the Vindication of the Memory of a Revolutionary Patriot & the Exposure of Fantastic Legends Concerning the House He Built. Bennington, VT: Bennington Historical Museum Publications, 1930.
- Republicans Must Choose. New York: Review of Reviews, 1936.
- Iron mining and smelting in Bennington, Vermont 1786 - 1842. Bennington, VT: Bennington Battle Monument and Historical Association, 1938.
- The A.B.C. of Bennington Pottery Wares, a Manual for Collectors and Dealers. Bennington, VT: Bennington Historical Museum, 1938.
- The Rise and Progress of Freemasonry in Vermont, the Green Mountain State, 1765-1944. Written for the Sesqui-centennial Anniversary Celebration of the Grand Lodge of Vermont, June 13–15, 1944. Burlington, VT: Grand Lodge of Vermont/Lane Press, 1944.
- The Return of Russell Colvin. Bennington, VT: Bennington Historical Museum and Art Gallery, 1945.
- Amabimus, amamus, amabimus. In memory of John Spargo, Jr., December 20, 1919—October 10, 1945. Bennington, VT: John Spargo, 1946.
- Verses Grave and Gay. Bennington, VT: John Spargo, 1946.
- An Illustrated Descriptive Sketch of Bennington Battle Monument, With an Account of Bennington Battle, August 16, 1777. Bennington, VT: Bennington Battle Monument and Historical Association, 1947.
- Two Bennington-Born Explorers and Makers of Modern Canada. Bradford, VT: Green Mountain Press, 1950.
- Faith and Fun at Sunset. Bennington, VT: John Spargo, 1951.
- Covered Wooden Bridges of Bennington County - Historical and Descriptive Account. Bennington, VT: Bennington Historical Museum and Art Gallery, 1953.
- The Old First Church of Bennington. Bennington, VT: Broad Brook Press, n.d. [1950s].
- The Reminiscences of John Spargo. [microfilm] n.c., n.p., 1957. OCLC 1458902.
