= Social Democratic League of America =

Short-lived American political party

- Founded: 1917
- Dissolved: 1920
- Split from: Socialist Party of America
- Ideology: Social democracy Pro-war patriotism
- Political position: Center-left

The Social Democratic League of America (SDLA) was a short-lived social-democratic political party established in 1917 by electorally-oriented socialists who favored the participation of the United States in World War I. Led by such intellectuals as John Spargo, Emanuel Haldeman-Julius, and William English Walling, the SDLA maintained effective control over the venerable American socialist newspaper The Appeal to Reason (then known as The New Appeal) during 1918, the year of the group's greatest public influence.

Claiming a membership of 2,500 at its peak — a number possibly inflated — the SDLA achieved some limited success in building support for the military effort among the wavering socialists of France and Great Britain during the last weary months of the war. Following the end of the European fighting, the SDLA lost much of its raison d'être and dissolved amidst personal acrimony, as did the National Party, a parallel political umbrella organization with which it was closely associated.

== Organizational history ==
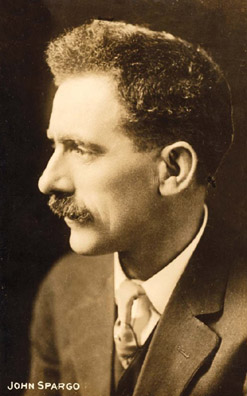
The Social Democratic League of America was the brainchild of John Spargo, a pro-war member of the Socialist Party of America who quit the organization in May 1918.

=== Background ===
American entry into World War I came in the immediate aftermath of President Woodrow Wilson's successful November 1916 re-election campaign, which made prominent use of the slogan "He Kept Us Out of War". Just months after Wilson's resounding victory, the resumption of unlimited submarine warfare by Germany early in 1917 pushed Wilson and the United States towards intervention in the European conflict.

For its part, the Socialist Party of America (SPA) had been steadfast in its opposition to militarism and American participation in the bloodbath on the other side of the Atlantic. Throughout 1915 and 1916, the SPA had consistently put forward pacifist views in opposition to the Preparedness Movement.

With the Wilson Administration clearly careening towards war, the Socialist Party had called an Emergency National Convention to open in the city of St. Louis, Missouri, where the party was to once again reiterate its anti-war stance and attempt to generate publicity so as to mobilize public opinion to keep America out of the war.

Events proved to outpace the best pacifistic intentions of the Socialists, however, and on April 6, 1917 Woodrow Wilson addressed the United States Congress in calling for a declaration of war against Germany. By the time the Socialist Party assembled in St. Louis on April 7, the direct participation of the United States in the war was an accomplished fact.

The most important work group at the Socialist Party's St. Louis Emergency National Convention was its Committee on War and Militarism, chaired by veteran party leader Morris Hillquit and including notably his New York comrade Algernon Lee, head of the Rand School of Social Science, and Cleveland radical C.E. Ruthenberg. This committee passed a majority resolution branding the American government's entrance into the European conflict as "a crime against the people of the United States and against the nations of the world" and promising "continuous, active, and public opposition to the war."

A pro-war minority, headed by Vermont author John Spargo put forward a competing resolution which charged Germany with having committed a "crime against Socialist principles" through its invasion of Belgium and affirming the "right of nations to defend themselves" as a fundamental principle of internationalism. Spargo's alternative resolutions garnered just 5 votes out of the nearly 200 delegates assembled in St. Louis and gained no headway when brought to the party membership as part of the process of ratifying the decisions of the Emergency Convention. Spargo and his co-thinkers soon found themselves outside the Socialist Party and in search of a new political organization to achieve their political intentions.

=== Establishment ===
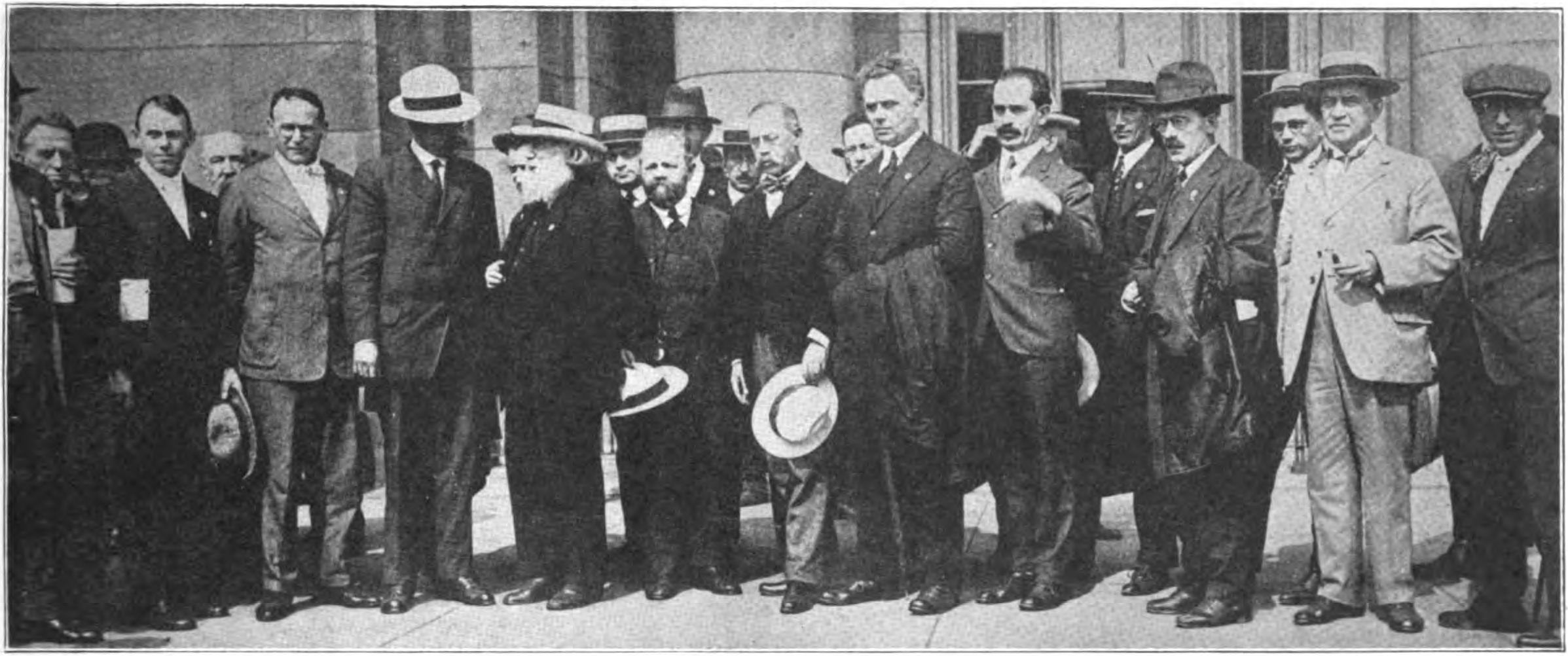
Founders of the Social Democratic League of America c. 1918. (L-R): T. J. Mead, Nicholas Klein, W. J. Ghent, Lucien Sanial, Judge Levy, Nachman Syrkin, Maurice Kass, Henry Slobodin, William Edlin, W. F. Cochran, John Spargo.

Spargo's idea was for the establishment of a new socialist propaganda organization called the Social Democratic League of America (SDLA). Working hand in glove with Spargo for the group's formation was New York "millionaire socialist" Graham Phelps Stokes, popular journalist Charles Edward Russell, author William J. Ghent, and New York attorney and movement veteran Henry L. Slobodin, among others.

Graham Stokes began work on a manifesto for the new organization during the second half of April 1917, intending to advance a vision of so-called "industrial democracy" which would prove attractive to great numbers of Americans. Stokes strove to step away from the Marxist idea of the class struggle, instead seeking to build a "spirit of cooperation with all who seek the same ends."

In its initial incarnation, the SDLA was conceived as a social democratic left wing of the pro-war movement, a propaganda group within a larger movement. The broader political umbrella group in which the SDLA was to function was the National Party, formed in a conclave held July 6–8, 1917 at the home of future Committee of 48 leader J.A.H. Hopkins in Morristown, New Jersey. Joining in this political organization would be members of the Single-Tax movement, the Nonpartisan League, and the Prohibition Party, among others.

Adding to the organizational confusion was yet another group with a largely overlapping membership base. Many of those involved in the SDLA would also soon be participants in the American Alliance for Labor and Democracy, a wartime entity closely associated with the American Federation of Labor and sought to shift that organization and the AF of L onto a more leftward political course through the tactic of boring from within.

While Graham Stokes made claim of a membership of 2,500 for the new organization late in 1917, historian Kenneth Hendrickson noted this to be a strictly "paper membership," with "almost all" of these inactive. Outside of the prominent intellectuals who made up the SDLA's leadership "the organization must be said to have existed on paper only," Hendrickson judged.

=== 1918 reorganization ===
Very nearly stillborn, an effort was made to boldly relaunch the Social Democratic League in 1918. An 87-member Organization Committee was cobbled together, consisting of like-minded representatives from 27 American states. This body in turn elected a provisional National Administrative Committee, headed by former Socialist Party member Henry L. Slobodin of New York. This body met frequently throughout the summer and fall of 1918. John Spargo was formally named the first chairman of the organization.

A simple three point set of general objects of the league were published in July 1918, including support of the war, support of Woodrow Wilson's peace terms "as interpreted by the Inter-Allied Socialist and Labor Conference of London," and securing for the United States "the program of social reconstruction set forth by the British Labour Party." The organization disclaimed any intent to be a political party, instead professing a desire to build "cooperation with all forces working for the [its] general aims."

In May 1918 the British-born Spargo appealed to the Wilson administration to send him on a mission to Europe in an effort to rally the flagging spirits of the socialist movement there to the war effort. Wilson, fearful of weakening popular resolve in France, Great Britain, and Italy, approved this idea and a six-member labor mission including Spargo was dispatched on a mission lasting two months.

Among the group was former Socialist Party member A.M. Simons, who declared the group's mission that of presenting "to the Socialists of Europe the American interpretation of democratic internationalism." Declaring the SDLA's complete opposition to the notion of a Stockholm peace conference, Simons observed that there was no such apprehension about "the right kind of conference." Such a conference was to be limited, Simons noted, exclusively to delegates "lending their whole power to democracy in its present warfare against autocracy."

In England Spargo and the labor delegation met with Henry Hyndman and worked closely with his Social Democratic Federation in an effort to undermine the growing strength of pacifist forces in the Labour Party headed by Ramsay MacDonald. The group addressed a crowd packed into Trafalgar Square in an effort to hear American socialists' views on the war and were feted afterwards by leaders of the House of Commons, who served a dinner in their honor. Some 30 Labour Members of Parliament were in attendance to exchange toasts and speeches. Kansas mine workers union leader Alexander Howat addressed several large meetings of British miners encouraging their renewed efforts in support of the war.

Proceeding to France, the delegation conducted personal interviews with Premier Georges Clemenceau, deposed Russian leader Alexander Kerensky, and French socialist leaders Marcel Sembat and Jean Longuet. A dinner was again held in honor of the American delegation, attended by 40 French Socialist deputies, and John Spargo issued a statement noting the Americans were "trying to arrange the organization of a pro-war Socialist league of all the Allied countries."

=== Structure ===
The provisional organization was formalized at a two-day conference held at the Cosmopolitan Hotel in New York City on October 27 and 28, 1918. This gathering restructured the organization, which was subsequently to be governed by a National Executive Committee of 15, headed by a non-voting Chairman. Muckraking journalist and author Charles Edward Russell was elected as the new chairman of the organization, with Slobodin tapped as vice-chairman, William English Walling as Secretary, and Graham Stokes as Treasurer.

Dues in the Social Democratic League were set at $1 per annum — a fraction of the dues amount charged by rival organizations such as the Socialist Party, the Non-partisan League, and the Industrial Workers of the World. By the fall of 1918 the organization claimed a paid membership of 1,100.

The SDLA did not publish its own newspaper but was the beneficiary of espousing the same pro-war political beliefs held by Emanuel Haldeman-Julius, managing editor of the seminal socialist weekly, The Appeal to Reason. Haldeman-Julius's paper — renamed The New Appeal in December 1917 — emerged by the summer of 1918 as the highly visible public information source of the new organization, providing the SDLA with both sympathetic coverage and space for its official pronouncements and membership solicitations.

In July, Haldeman-Julius announced that he was henceforth the "Acting Assistant Secretary" of the SDLA and that the small Southeastern Kansas town of Girard would be the national headquarters of the organization. The organization had previously been planning to open a headquarters in Washington, D.C., until Haldeman-Julius and SDLA financial angel J.I. Sheppard of neighboring Kansas conceived of the idea to make the home of The Appeal the home of the new organization. Despite only having a population of 3,000, Girard had postal facilities and capacity of a city many times its size due to the massive volume generated by the Appeal to Reason over the years, helping to justify the unorthodox decision.

=== Policy initiatives ===
The October 1918 founding conference passed a resolution of support of the wartime policies of Samuel Gompers and his American Federation of Labor, declaring that the AF of L leadership and its wholehearted support of the American war effort expressed "most fully the proper devotion and enthusiasm for the principles of democracy and liberty in the most crucial hour civilization has ever known. The AF of L's call for labor representation at the post-war peace conference was formally seconded.

The SDLA furthermore called for intervention in Soviet Russia, declaring that German invasion on the one hand and the non-representative nature of the Bolshevik regime on the other had rendered Russia "practically a colony of Germany." Russia was judged "not ready for socialism," which in addition "can only be established through democracy and not through a dictatorship of the proletariat, thus making the need for Western military intervention to "save Russia" imperative, in the view of the Social Democratic League.

In January 1919, authors C.E. Russell and William English Walling traveled to Europe under the banner of the Social Democratic League in an effort to advance the idea among French and British socialists that anti-imperialism and American war aims were not incompatible. Russell and Walling attempted to solicit support among fellow socialists for the Fourteen Points put forward by President Wilson and for the establishment of a League of Nations to help administer the post-war peace.

Russell and Walling similarly affirmed their support of the Wilson administration's hostility to the fledgling Bolshevik government of Soviet Russia, while expressing critical comments about the Berne Conference of Allied socialist parties. The disfavor with which the American group held the new international seems to have been reciprocated, as SDLA member Frank Bohn was subsequently denied the opportunity to address the Berne Conference on the SDLA's behalf.

=== Dissolution ===
The termination of the war in Europe removed much of the patriotic fervor that drove the Social Democratic League forward. The domestic policies of the group were neither original nor extraordinary, and the organization's was lost amidst the cacophony of competing groups, publications, and individuals putting forward programs for post-war reconstruction. Emanuel Haldeman-Julius, nothing if not a savvy businessman, unhitched his New Appeal from the feeble and declining SDLA, changing the name back to Appeal to Reason on March 1, 1919, and embarking on a new career selling Little Blue Books. Financial problems plagued the organization. With a low dues rate and small membership size, gross income paled next to the grandiose international aspirations of its leaders.

Moreover, personal rivalry shattered the intellectuals who comprised the SDLA's leadership. Walling and Russell, who succeeded Spargo and Stokes as the official leadership of the SDLA, desired the organization to enter the growing Farmer-Labor Party movement of the day, while Stokes and Spargo toyed with the idea of launching a new social democratic youth organization to compete with the Intercollegiate Socialist Society, a group closely tied to the Socialist Party. Neither proved successful. A January 1920 manifesto using Stokes' name without his permission to advocate a policy of which he did not approve — joining the Farmer-Labor movement to fight the Democratic Party in the polls — further exacerbated tensions.

The SDLA lost its key founder in February 1920, when John Spargo abruptly quit the organization in response to a letter to the New York Times written by William English Walling in the name of the organization. Spargo took exception to Walling and the SDLA's endorsement of the New York legislative "trial" of five expelled Socialist assemblymen who were denied their seats on a political pretext.

"I do not see how it is possible for any Socialist to make any statements or take any action at this time calculated to assist the reactionaries of the New York Legislature in their stupid and dangerous attempt to destroy the right of the Socialist Party to representation," Spargo declared upon submitting his resignation. Spargo indicated that he believed Walling to have fallen "entirely on the side of anti-socialist forces in this country" and to have become a party to a "dangerous assault on the fundamental principles of political democracy."

With neither a pressing moral mission, nor a united leadership, nor a widely read official organ, nor an active membership, nor a coherent program, nor financial resources, the Social Democratic League rapidly withered and died during the first half of 1920.

== Prominent members ==
- Allan L. Benson
- Frank Bohn
- William F. Cochran
- William Edlin
- William J. Ghent
- Emanuel Haldeman-Julius
- Alexander Howat
- Maurice Kass
- Nicholas Klein
- Louis Kopelin
- T. J. Mead
- C.E. Russell
- Lucien Sanial
- J. I. Sheppard
- A. M. Simons
- Upton Sinclair
- Henry Slobodin
- John Spargo
- J. G. Phelps Stokes
- Nachman Syrkin
- William English Walling
- Chester M. Wright

== See also ==
- American Alliance for Labor and Democracy
- National Party

== Publications ==
- Preliminary Outline of the Organization of the Social Democratic League of America. New York: n.p., 1917.
- Objects of the Social Democratic League of America. New York: Social Democratic League of America, n.d. [c. 1918].
- Labor's War Aims: I. Memorandum on War Aims: Adopted by the Inter-Allied Labor and Socialist Conference, February 22, 1918. II. The Allied Cause is the Cause of Socialist Internationalism: Joint Manifesto of the Social Democratic League of America and the Jewish Socialist League. New York: American Association for International Conciliation, 1918.
- A Program of Social Construction After the War. New York: Social Democratic League of America, n.d. [c. 1918].
- Social Democratic League of America: One Year's Activity of the Reorganized Society (July, 1918 to May, 1919). New York: Social Democratic League of America, n.d. [1919].
- Why I Left the Socialist Party. —No further information.
- What the War Has Done to Socialism in America. —No further information.
