= Ben Hanford =

American socialist

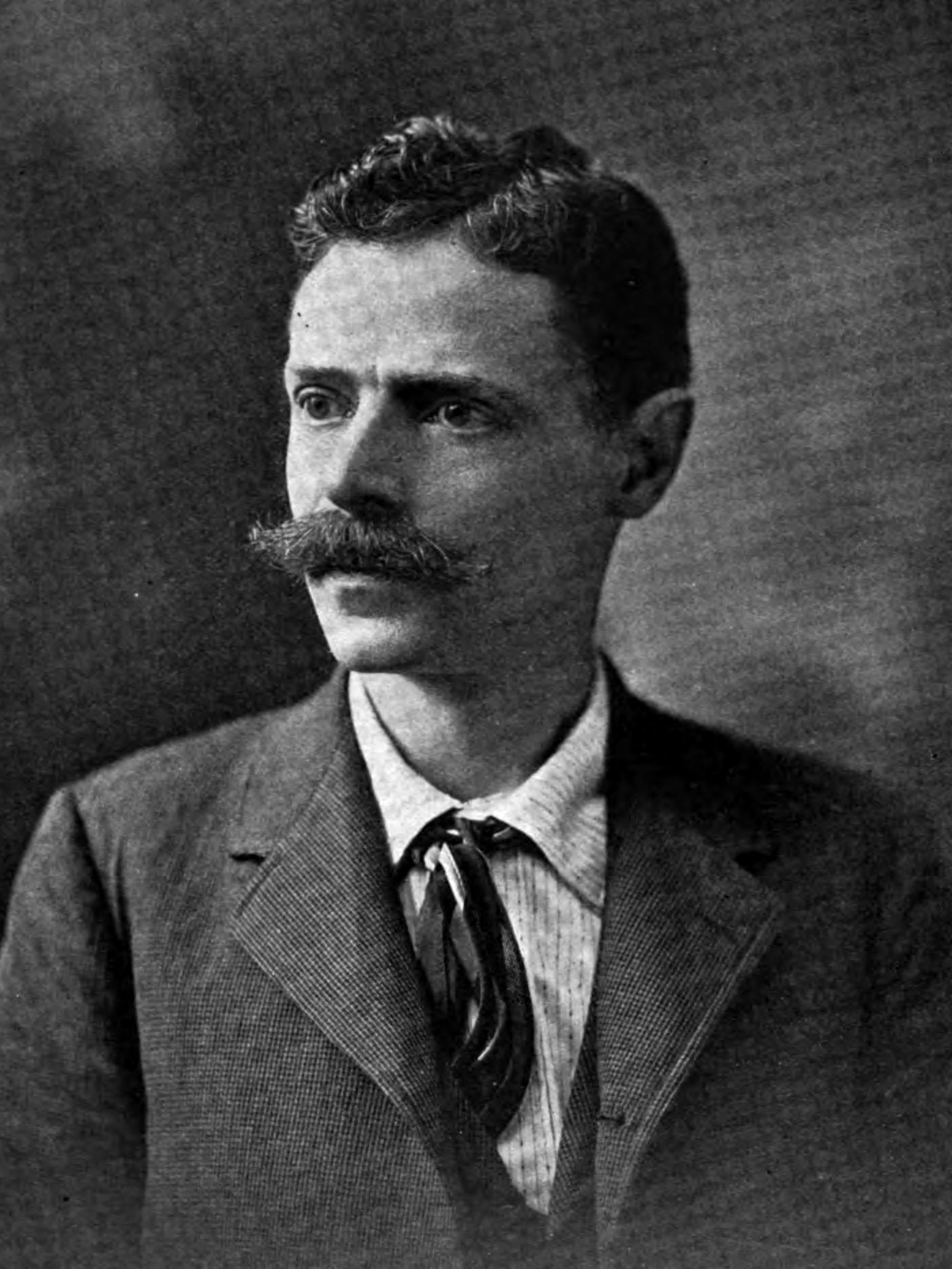
- Hanford c. 1904
- Born: 1861; Cleveland, Ohio, U.S.
- Died: January 24, 1910 (aged 48–49); New York City, U.S.
- Occupations: Printer, activist, politician
- Political party: Socialist Labor (1893–1899); Social Democratic (1899–1901); Socialist (1901–1910)
- Spouse: Alice Miriam Burnham (m. 1908)

Benjamin Hanford (1861 – January 24, 1910) was an American socialist politician during the late 19th and early 20th centuries. A printer by trade, Hanford is best remembered for his 1904 and 1908 runs for Vice President of the United States on the ticket of the Socialist Party of America, running next to Presidential nominee Eugene V. Debs. Hanford was also the creator of the fictional character "Jimmie Higgins," a prototypical Socialist rank-and-filer whose silent work on the unglamorous tasks needed by any political organization made the group's achievements possible — a character later reprised in a novel by Upton Sinclair.

== Biography ==
=== Early life ===
Benjamin Hanford was born in Cleveland, Ohio in 1861, the son of George Byington Hanford and Susan Elizabeth Martin Hanford. Ben's mother died when he was in infancy. Hanford's father later married Frances Jane Thompson, a woman from Bangor, Maine who as Hanford's step-mother imparted a taste for scholarship and culture upon him.

As a boy, Hanford worked for a newspaper, learning the printer's trade at the Marshalltown Republican of Marshalltown, Iowa. With his 18th birthday approaching, Hanford left Iowa for the great regional metropolis of Chicago, where on February 26, 1879, he became a member of the Chicago Typographical Union, a local affiliate of the International Typographical Union. Hanford would remain a dues-paying member of that organization for the rest of his life.

In 1892, Hanford relocated to New York City. There he worked as a printer and became involved in the affairs of International Typographical Union Local No. 6 — known as "Big Six" in that era.

=== Political career ===
Postcard produced by the German-language New Yorker Volkszeitung to support the 1908 Debs-Hanford campaign. The legend reads: "Support the banner-bearers of the party of the working class / Vote on Election Day for the Socialist Party!"

In 1893, a fellow printer from Philadelphia named Fred Long converted his fellow union member to the ideas of socialism. Hanford joined the dominant American socialist political organization of the day, the Socialist Labor Party (SLP). Hanford was selected to head the New York state ticket of the SLP in 1898, running for Governor of New York. In 1899, the SLP split, and Hanford left the organization with an anti-dual union faction led by Morris Hillquit and Henry Slobodin and centered around the New Yorker Volkszeitung.

Hanford was nominated again in 1900 as New York gubernatorial candidate and as 1901 candidate for Mayor of New York by this breakaway political group, which named itself the "Social Democratic Party" after losing a lawsuit over use of the name and emblem of the SLP filed by the majority loyal to party leaders Daniel DeLeon and Henry Kuhn.

In August 1901, the eastern "Social Democratic Party" of Hillquit, Slobodin, and Hanford merged with the Chicago-based Social Democratic Party of America headed by Eugene V. Debs and Victor L. Berger to form the Socialist Party of America (SPA), of which Hanford became a charter member. Hanford was tapped the New York ticket of the SPA in the November 1902, running for Governor of New York for a third time.

Hanford was regarded as an effective orator who possessed both "a burning earnestness" and "an ability to clothe his thoughts and feelings into the simplest and most direct language." This reputation, combined with his previous experience running for high office in New York state, made Hanford a majority choice among Socialist Party convention delegates to be the party's Vice-Presidential nominee in the 1904 and 1908 United States presidential elections.

In addition to his efforts as a labor organizer and socialist orator and political candidate, Hanford was an effective pamphleteer, winning praise for his 1901 tract, Railroading in the United States, and making a lasting mark on the literature of American socialism with his short story "Jimmie Higgins," lauding the silent efforts of a prototypical Socialist rank-and-file member to complete the mundane tasks that made an effective political movement possible. This character, reckoned by one commentator as "a veritable apotheosis of the faithful worker in the ranks," was reprised after Hanford's death in a novel by the same title by Upton Sinclair.

=== Death and legacy ===
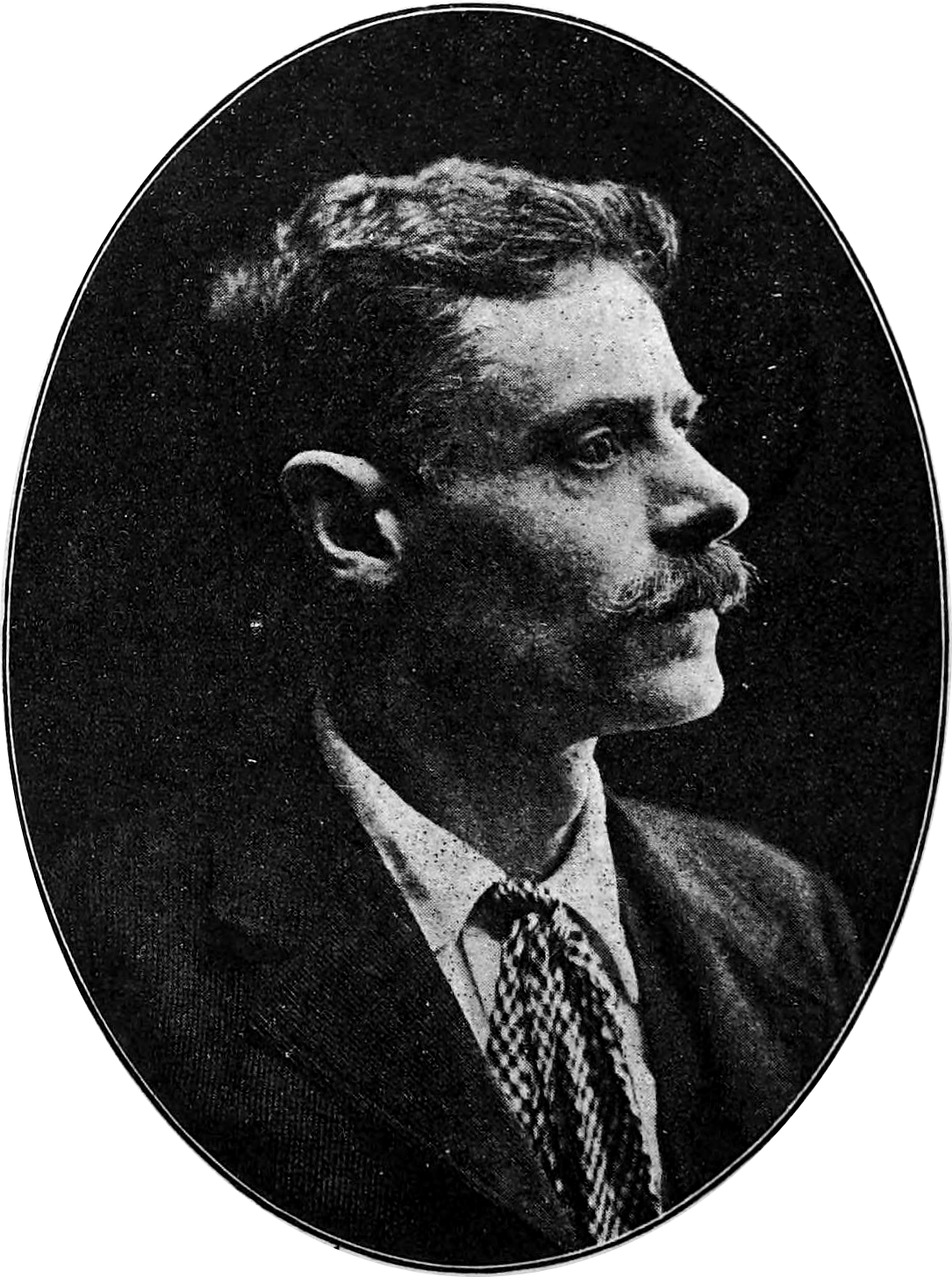
Portrait of Hanford published in the International Socialist Review shortly after his death, March 1910

Following the close of the 1908 Socialist Party National Convention, at which he was nominated for vice president for a second time, Hanford was stricken by "a virulent stomach trouble." The chronic condition proved incapacitating, forcing Hanford off the campaign trail and limiting his contributions to the written word. Hanford rallied for a time following the close of the campaign, spending time and effort attempting to raise funds for the New York Call, socialist daily newspaper in New York City.

On November 22, 1908, the committed 48-year-old bachelor Hanford married Alice Miriam Burnham, a fellow Socialist from New York City. The couple made their home in the Flatbush section of Brooklyn. Unfortunately, Hanford's health again began to decline, taking what would ultimately prove to be its terminal turn.

In 1909, with Hanford bedridden, a retrospective in his honor entitled Fight for Your Life!: Recording Some Activities of a Labor Agitator was unveiled by the Wilshire Book Company of New York, publishing house run by Wilshire's Magazine editor Gaylord Wilshire. Hanford's demise proved to be slow and painful, with his friend John C. Chase noting that he was confined to bed "for weeks and sometimes for months" in an "agony such as few men have to endure," while his body wasted from "the ravages of long continued illness."

Ben Hanford died at his home in Brooklyn, New York at noon on Monday, January 24, 1910, with his wife and party comrades by his bedside. His last hours were said to have been "peaceful and free of pain."

== Works ==
- McKinley, Bryan or Debs? New York: G. Speyer, 1900.
- Railroading in the United States. New York: Socialistic Cooperative Publishing Association, 1901.
- Hanford's Reply to Havemeyer: Patriotism and Socialism. New York: Comrade Cooperative, 1903.
- What Workingmen's Votes Can Do. Chicago: National Committee of the Socialist Party, 1904.
- The Labor War in Colorado. New York: Socialistic Cooperative Publishing Association, 1904.
- Speeches of Acceptance of Eugene V. Debs and Ben. Hanford: Candidates of the Socialist Party for President and Vice-President; Delivered at the National Convention of the Socialist Party Held at Chicago, May 1–6, 1904. Chicago: National Committee of the Socialist Party, 1904.
- Shall the Mine Owners Murder Moyer and Haywood Because They are Trade Union Officials? New York: n.p., n.d. [c. 1906].
- Fight for Your Life! Recording Some Activities of a Labor Agitator. Introduction by Joshua Wanhope. New York: Wilshire Book Co., 1909.
- The Jimmie Higgins. Girard, KS: Appeal to Reason, n.d. [1919].

"Jimmie Higgins" is also a one man play by Portland, ME writer and actor Harlan Baker.
