= The Bitter Cry of Children =

1906 book about child labor by John Spargo

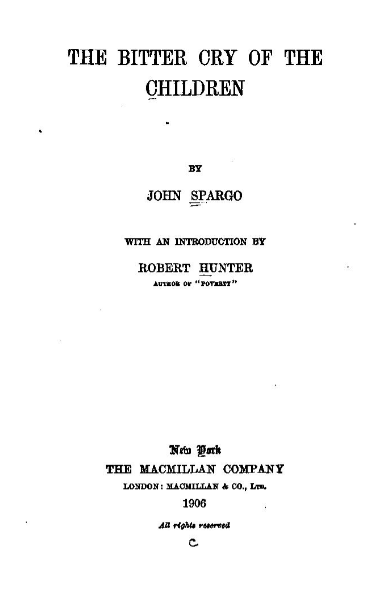
- Author: John Spargo
- Publication date: 1906

The Bitter Cry of the Children is a book by socialist writer John Spargo, a muckraker and investigative journalist from the Progressive Period. Published in 1906, it is an exposé of the horrific working conditions of child laborers in the early 1900's. He discusses the works of the children he saw very emotionally. As Spargo says, "boys sit hour after hours, picking at the pieces of slate and other [trash]... I once stood... and tried to do the work a twelve-year-old boy was doing day after day, for ten hours at a stretch, for sixty cents a day. The gloom... [troubled] me".
