= Charles Edward Russell =

American journalist (1860–1941)

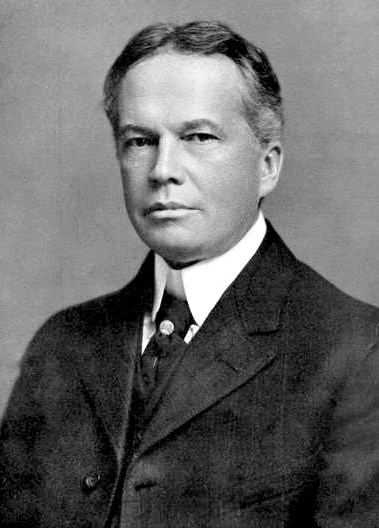
- Russell in 1907
- Born: September 25, 1860; Davenport, Iowa
- Died: April 23, 1941 (aged 80); Washington, DC
- Occupations: Journalist; writer; politician; civil rights activist
- Relatives: Frederick Russell Burnham (first cousin); Howard Burnham (first cousin)
- Writing career
- Notable awards: Pulitzer Prize, biography, 1928

Charles Edward Russell (September 25, 1860 – April 23, 1941) was an American journalist, opinion columnist, newspaper editor, and political activist. In 1928, he won the Pulitzer Prize for Biography or Autobiography for The American Orchestra and Theodore Thomas.

== Early life ==
Russell was born in Davenport, Iowa, a transportation center on the Mississippi River on the far eastern border of the state. His father, Edward Russell, was editor of the Davenport Gazette and a noted abolitionist. The Russell family were staunchly religious Christian Evangelicals, with Charles' grandfather a Baptist minister and his father a Sunday school superintendent and a leader of the Iowa YMCA.

Russell attended St. Johnsbury Academy (Class of 1881), in St. Johnsbury, Vermont, for his high school education and also worked under his father at the newspaper.

Russell wrote for the Minneapolis Journal, the Detroit Tribune, the New York World, William Randolph Hearst's Cosmopolitan, and the New York Herald. He was employed as a newspaper writer and editor in New York and Chicago from 1894 to 1902, working successively for the New York World, the New York American, and the Chicago American. In 1912 he appeared as one of the editors of The Coming Nation, a socialist newspaper published by J. A. Wayland and Fred D. Warren in Girard, Kansas.

== Muckraking ==
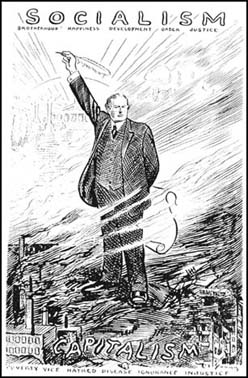
Russell as drawn by Art Young in 1912.

In his memoirs, Bare Hands and Stone Walls, Russell stated that "transforming the world... to a place where one can know some peace... some joy of living, some sense of the inexhaustible beauties of the universe in which he has been placed" was the purpose that inspired his work and his life. Russell felt strongly about the hardships of the working class, particularly unfair working and living conditions. Factories often had poor workplace conditions with long hours and low wages, in addition to inadequate safety measures which lead to high rates of serious injury. Workers and their families lived in slums with little to no sanitation, making the outbreak of infectious disease a common occurrence. These issues also disproportionally affected newly arrived immigrants, and served as key inspiration for Russel and his writing.

Russell was a high-profile muckraker, a progressive era movement in journalism, claiming to focus on exposing corruption and wrongdoing in established institutions. Muckrakers most commonly targeted the corporate monopolies or political machines of the era, claiming they perpetrated and profited off of unsafe working conditions, urban poverty, and child labor. The muckraker movement helped to jumpstart numerous reforms that included prison conditions, railroads and church-building conditions.

In Soldier for the Common Good, an unpublished dissertation on Russell's life, author Donald Bragaw wrote, "Historian Louis Filler has called Russell the leader of the muckrakers for contributing 'important studies in almost every field in which they ventured.'" Shortly after his hiatus from writing because of the death of his first wife, Russell wrote "The Greatest Trust in the World," exposing the unsafe and exploitative practices of the meatpacking industry.

Russell's reports on the corrupt practices and inhuman conditions at Chicago stock yards were the inspiration for Upton Sinclair's novel The Jungle, which caused a national uproar that led to inspection reforms. Russell's most controversial exposé was fixated on the Trinity Church. It accused the church of being one of the leading slum landlords in New York City and was detrimental to the church's reputation.

That accusation resulted in the church taking swift action to the report by cleaning up or selling the worst of their properties. After traveling the world in investigative journalism, Russell's beliefs about capitalism began to be stronger and stronger. He believed that capitalism itself was quite faulty and that the financial endeavors of the United States that led the economy were corrupt. As his convictions became deeper, Russell recognized that his beliefs were in line with that of the Socialist Party, leading him to join in 1908.

== NAACP founder ==
In 1909, Russell was one of the 63 people who worked together to found the National Association for the Advancement of Colored People (NAACP), formed in the aftermath of a race riot at Springfield, Illinois, in August 1908. Russell's participation in the founding of the NAACP stemmed from his experiences with violence and racism as a child, a particularly notable experience included his father nearly being hanged for opposing slavery. Russell served and participated on the board of directors of the NAACP for the remainder of his life.

== Socialist politician ==
In 1908, Russell joined the Socialist Party of America.

Russell was its candidate for Governor of New York in 1910 and 1912, and for U.S. Senator from New York in 1914. He also ran for Mayor of New York City. Russell's belief that Germany was an undeniable threat to the US in 1915 made him unexpectedly come out in support of President Woodrow Wilson's war "preparedness campaign." That decision painted Russell into a tight corner politically as the majority of the party's rank and file remained strongly antiwar. Its leader, Eugene Debs believed that Russell's decision to support Wilson's move for rearmament probably cost Russell the party's presidential nomination in 1916. Later that year, Russell separated from his party and became a part of a group known as "prowar socialists." Debs disagreed profoundly with Russell on the issue but applauded him for the courage of his convictions.

Russell would ultimately be expelled from the Socialist Party in 1917 for supporting American intervention in the First World War.

== Root mission to Russia ==
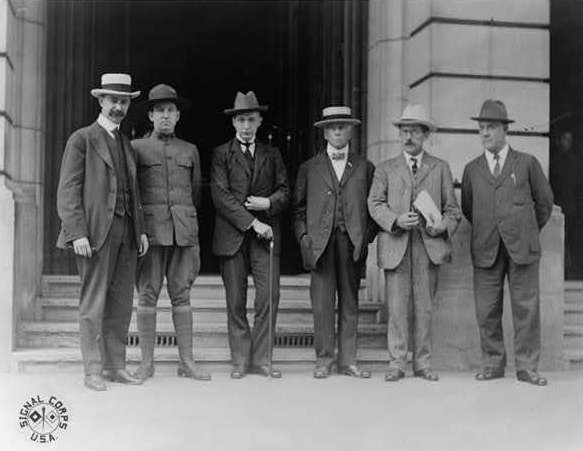
Charles Edward Russell with other members of the US diplomatic mission sent to Russia in 1917 by President Woodrow Wilson.

Aligning himself with Sinclair, among others in the right wing of the party, Russell continued to agitate for "responsible... Marxian" positions inside the Socialist Party until 1917.

After the February Revolution, Russell was named by Wilson to join a mission led by Elihu Root that was intended to keep the Russian Provisional Government of Alexander Kerensky in the war. The mission report recommended for George Creel's Committee on Public Information to conduct pro-war propaganda efforts in Russia. Russell personally lobbied Wilson to use the relatively-new medium of film to influence the Russian public. Wilson was receptive, and the Committee on Public Information then developed film and distribution networks in Russia over the next few months. Russell appears as himself in the 1917 film The Fall of the Romanoffs, directed by Herbert Brenon, which may have been a product of those efforts.

Participation in the Root Mission cut his ties with the Socialist Party, which remained solidly opposed to the war. Russell left it to join the Social Democratic League of America. He also worked with the American Federation of Labor to help found the patriotic American Alliance for Labor and Democracy, an organization that agitated on behalf of American participation in the war among the country's workers.

== Later life ==
Russell subsequently became an editorial writer for social democratic magazine The New Leader.

== Death and legacy ==
Russel died on April 23, 1941, in Washington, D.C., at the age of 80.

Russell's papers are housed at the Library of Congress in Washington, D.C.

== Works ==
=== Books and pamphlets ===
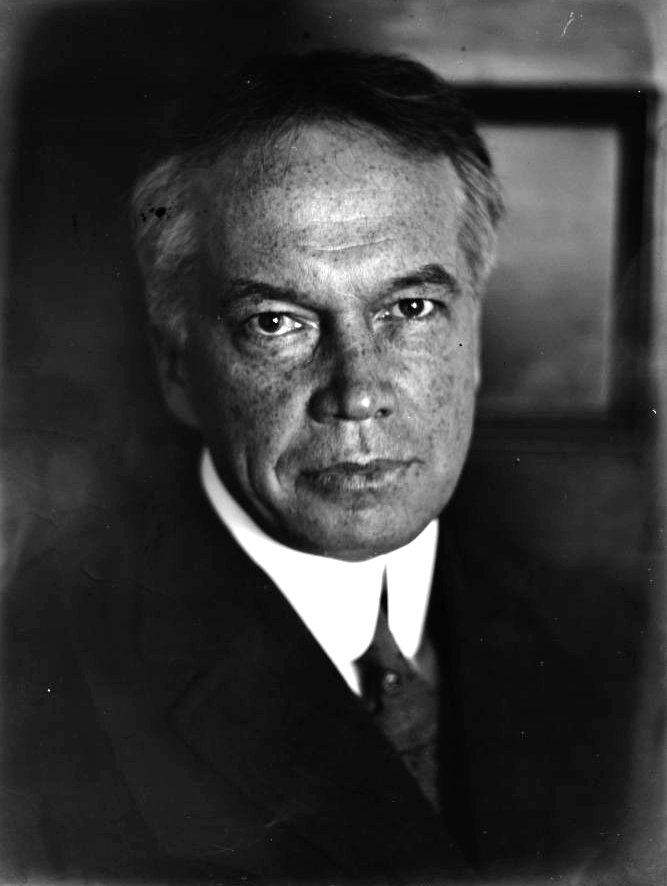
Charles E. Russell

- Such Stuff as Dreams. Indianapolis, IN: Bowen-Merrill, 1901.
- The Twin Immoralities and Other Poems. Chicago: Hammersmark, 1904.
- The Greatest Trust in the World. New York: Ridgeway-Thayer, 1905.
- The Uprising of the Many. New York: Doubleday, Page & Co., 1907.
- Lawless Wealth: The Origin of Some Great American Fortunes. New York: B.W. Dodge, 1908.
- Songs of Democracy and Other Themes. New York: Moffat, Yard & Co., 1909.
- Thomas Chatterton: The Marvelous Boy: The Story of a Strange Life, 1752-1770. London: Richards, 1909.
- Why I Am a Socialist. New York: Hodder and Stoughton, 1910.
- Business: The Heart of the Nation. New York: John Lane, 1911.
- Socialism the Only Remedy. Chicago: Socialist Party, 1912.
- The Passing Show of Capitalism. Girard, KS: Appeal to Reason, 1912.
- Stories of the Great Railroads. Chicago: Charles H. Kerr & Co., 1912.
- Doing Us Good and Plenty. Chicago: Charles H. Kerr & Co., 1914.
- These Shifting Scenes. New York: Hodder and Stoughton, 1914.
- The Story of Wendell Phillips: Soldier of the Common Good. Chicago: Charles H. Kerr & Co., 1914.
- Unchained Russia. New York: D. Appleton & Co., 1918.
- After the Whirlwind: A Book of Reconstruction and Profitable Thanksgiving. New York: George H. Doran, 1919.
- Bolshevism and the United States. Indianapolis, IN: Bobbs-Merrill, 1919.
- The Story of the Nonpartisan League: A Chapter in American Evolution. New York: Harper & Bros., 1920.
- Railroad Melons, Rates and Wages: A Handbook of Railroad Information. Chicago: Charles H. Kerr & Co., 1922.
- The Outlook for the Philippines. New York: The Century Co., 1922.
- The Hero of the Filipinos: The Story of Jose Rizal, Poet, Patriot and Martyr. With E.B. Rodriguez. New York: The Century Co., 1923.
- Julia Marlowe: Her Life and Art. New York: Appleton & Co., 1926.
- The American Orchestra and Theodore Thomas. Garden City, NY: Doubleday, Page & Co., 1927.
- A-rafting on the Mississipp'. New York: The Century Co., 1928.
- An Hour of American Poetry. New York: J.B. Lippincott, 1929.
- From Sandy Hook to 62°; Being Some Account of the Adventures, Exploits and Services of the Old New York Pilot-Boat., The Century Co., New York, 1929.
- Haym Salomon and the Revolution. New York: Cosmopolitan Book Co., 1930.
- Charlemagne: First of the Moderns. New York: Houghton Mifflin Co., 1930.
- Blaine of Maine: His Life and Times. New York: Cosmopolitan Book Co., 1931.
- Bare Hands and Stone Walls: Some Recollections of a Sideline Reformer. New York: Charles Scribner's Sons, 1933. —Autobiography.
- A Pioneer Editor in Early Iowa: A Sketch of the Life of Edward Russell. Washington, DC: Randsdell, 1941.

=== Selected articles ===
- "The Clergyman's Daughter," Waverly, March 1897, pg. 48.
- "The Greatest of World's Fairs," Munsey's, Nov. 1900, pp. 161–184.
- "The Story of the Nineteenth Century," Munsey's, Jan. 1901, pp. 551–559.
- "Are There Two Rudyard Kiplings?" Cosmopolitan, Oct. 1901, pp. 653–660.
- "William Randolph Hearst," Harper's Weekly, pp. 790–792.
- "Marshall Field, A Great Commercial Genius," Everybody's Magazine, March 1906, pp. 291–302.
- "Mr. Hearst As I Knew Him," Ridgway's, Oct. 1906, pp. 279–291.
- "Caste — The Curse of India," Cosmopolitan, Dec. 1906, pp. 124–135.
- "The Growth of Caste in America," Cosmopolitan, March 1907, pp. 524–534.
- "The Haymarket and Afterwards," Appleton's, Oct. 1907, pp. 399–412.
- "Tenements of Trinity Church," Everybody's Magazine, June 1908, pp. 47–57.
- "The Growing Menace of Socialism," Hampton's, Jan. 1909, pp. 119–126.
- "Robert Marion La Follette". Human Life, July 1909, pp. 7–8, 24.
- "The Press and the Public" La Follette's Magazine, June 4, 1910, pp. 7–8.
- "The Remedy of the Law," Hampton's, Aug. 1910, pp. 217–230.
- "Railroad Revolution," Pearson's Magazine, Feb. to May, 1913.
- "The Keeping of the Kept Press," Pearson's Magazine, Jan. 1914, pp. 33–43.
- "How Business Controls News," Pearson's Magazine, May 1914, pp. 546–557.
- "The Revolt of the Farmers: A Lesson in Constructive Radicalism," Pearson's Magazine, April 1915, pp. 417–427.
- "Why England Falls Down," Pearson's Magazine, Aug. 1915, pp. 201–219.
- "The New Socialist Alignment," Harper's Magazine, March 1918, pp. 563–570.
- "Radical Press in America," Bookman, July 1919, pp. 513–518.
- "Collective Bargaining in the President's First Industrial Conference," Annals of the American Academy of Political and Social Science, vol. 90 (July 1920), pp. 68–69.
- "About a 'Tolerable Autocracy,'" Young India, Aug. 1920.
- "Is Woman Suffrage a Failure?" The Century, March 1924, pp. 724–730.
- "Take Them or Leave Them," The Century, June 1926.
- "An Old Reporter Looks at the Mad-House World," Scribner's Magazine, Oct. 1933, pp. 225–230.
- "Toward the American Commonwealth: Social Democracy: Constant Gradualism as the Technique for Social Advance," Social Frontier, Oct. 1938, pp. 22–24.

=== Film ===
Russell played himself in the 1917 film The Fall of the Romanoffs, a dramatization of the Russian revolution and the influence of Rasputin on the Russian royal family.

== Sources ==
- Barrett, James R. (2002). Work and Community in the Jungle: Chicago's Packinghouse Workers, 1894–1922. Urbana, IL: University of Illinois Press.
- Merriam, Charles E. (1919). "American Publicity in Italy". American Political Science Review. 13 (4): 541–555. doi:10.2307/1944209. JSTOR 1944209. S2CID 147293730.
- Miraldi, Robert (2003). The Pen is Mightier: The Muckraking Life of Charles Edward Russell. New York: Palgrave Macmillan.
- Ruotsila, Markku (2006). "Neoconservatism Prefigured: The Social Democratic League of America and the Anticommunists of the Anglo-American Right, 1917–21". Journal of American Studies. 40 (2): 327–345. doi:10.1017/S002187580600140X. JSTOR 27557795. S2CID 143619941.
- Schultz, Stanley K. (1965). "The Morality of Politics: The Muckrakers' Vision of Democracy". Journal of American History. 52 (3): 527–547. doi:10.2307/1890846. JSTOR 1890846.
- Thompson, J. A. (1971). "American Progressive Publicists and the First World War, 1914–1917". Journal of American History. 58 (2): 364–383. doi:10.2307/1917605. JSTOR 1917605.
