= National Party (United States) =

Short-lived American political party

- Founded: 1917
- Dissolved: 1919
- Split from: Socialist Party of America
- Ideology: Social democracy Progressivism; Pro-war patriotism
- Political position: Center-left

The National Party was an early-20th-century national political organization in the United States founded by pro-war defectors from the Socialist Party of America (SPA) in 1917. These adherents of the SPA Right first formed a non-partisan national society to propagandize the socialist idea called the Social Democratic League of America. Many of these individuals were eager for the formation of an alternative political organization to both the old parties and the anti-war SPA and eagerly latched on to a burgeoning movement for a new party that sprouted in 1917.

== Organizational history ==
=== Origins ===
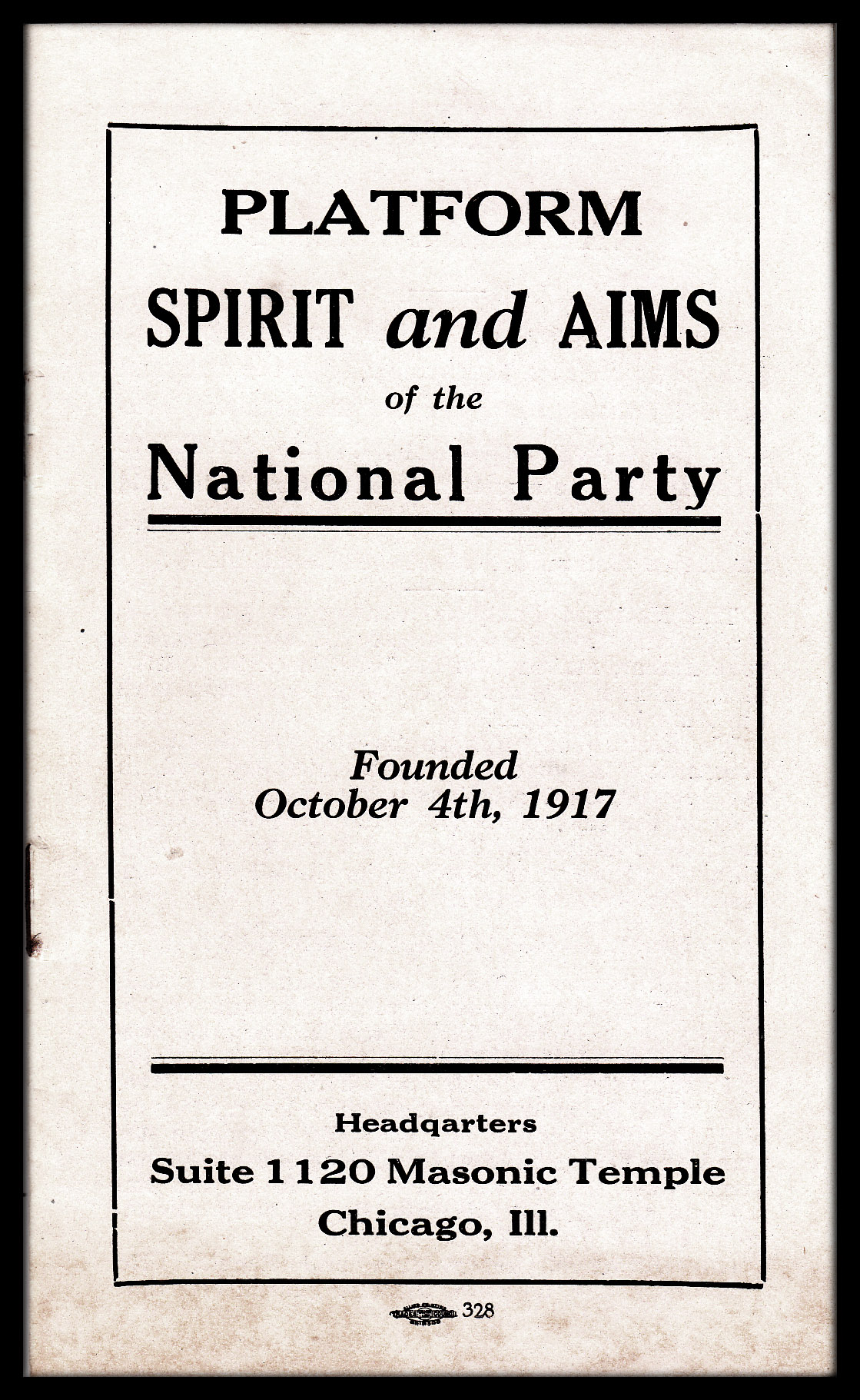
Pictured is one of the few documents left to posterity by the National Party was the group's platform, produced as a pamphlet.

The National Party seems to have begun as a byproduct of personal coalitions around single-issue advocacy, such as the drive for constitutional amendments for woman's suffrage and prohibition. Coming together to lobby Congress and the Wilson Administration on behalf of these measures, activists came to realize their common vision in practical terms, despite whatever philosophical differences they might have harbored in the theoretical plain. Thus veterans of the Progressive Party believing in the "spirit of 1912," Prohibitionists, suffragists, Single-Taxers, and Socialists began to talk amongst themselves about the possibility of uniting their forces in a new political organization to advance their common cause.

Informal conferences were held in New York and elsewhere in the country during the first half of 1917 between these individuals, culminating in a more formal gathering held July 6–8 at the home of Progressive Party leader J. A. H. Hopkins in Morristown, New Jersey. Those participating included bolting pro-war socialists organizing themselves as the Social Democratic League of America, adherents of the Nonpartisan League, the Prohibition Party, and the Single Tax movement.

The group did discuss and decide upon the outlines of a program for the forthcoming organization. The New Jersey conference was unable to agree amongst themselves to a name for the organization, so the matter was deferred to a future organizational conference, which ultimately decided upon the name "The National Party" for the new organization.

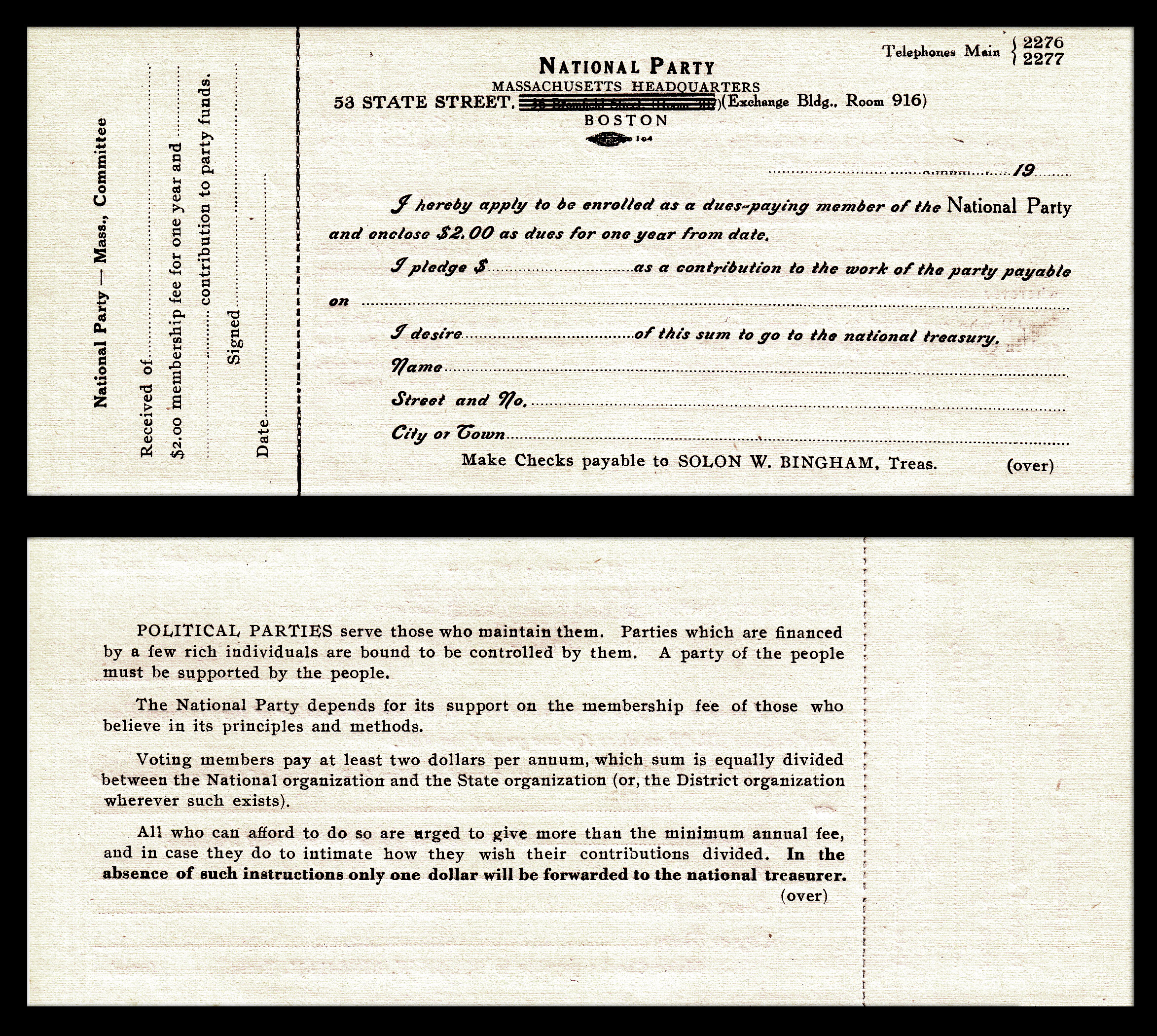
Basic dues in the National Party were $2 per year. The organization also sought additional "pledges" on the part of its members.

The National Party was funded by annual dues payments by its members, based according to the means of the party member, but of not less than $2 per annum. One dollar of this amount was to be retained by the national organization to fund its operation, while the other dollar was to rebated to the state organization for its own support. Party members were to receive membership cards and a periodic bulletin was planned. Those not wishing to cast their lot with the organization as full members could gain "sympathizer" status through the purchase of an annual button for fifty cents.

The National Party's national office was located in the Lafayette Building, 138 N. LaSalle Street, Chicago, Illinois. It also had an office for its "Eastern Division" located at 15 E 40th Street, New York City.

=== Founding Conference, Chicago, Illinois October 3–4, 1917 ===
The founding conference of the National Party adopted a tentative platform declaring for universal and equal suffrage; for strong advocacy of the rights of Initiative, Referendum, and Recall; for the absentee ballot as a means of enfranchising and deradicalizing transient labor; for prohibition of the sale and use of alcoholic beverages; for prison reform; for a system of proportional representation allowing minor parties representation according to voting strength; and for government ownership of transportation, communications, and other natural monopolies.

The conference adopted a declaration in support of American participation in the ongoing World War which declared:

"Fundamentally the war is struggle between the ideals and aspirations of democracy on the one hand, and the ideals and aspirations of autocracy on the other hand. Imperfect though our democracy may be, nevertheless it is one of the most advanced in the world.

"We rejoice in the assurance that in the words of President Wilson we have entered this war for no selfish objects of our own ...

"We entered the war to resist international aggression and lawlessness, to establish a permanent basis for international peace, and to aid the movement toward democracy in all lands. Believing that these aims are coincident with the best interests of all free peoples, and even those of the people of Germany, and confident that this nation will not forget these aims nor permit our forces to be used for conquest or imperialistic oppression, we pledge our full and undivided support to our nation and its allies in the pursuit of these aims."

The group also called in no uncertain terms for an end to the "unlimited power of censorship now reposed in the Postmaster General," in favor of a less draconian "national council of censorship, upon which the various social reform and labor movements of the country shall be adequately represented."

One historian has noted that except for the addition of a plank calling for the prohibition of alcohol the platform of the National Party "virtually duplicated the Socialist Party platform of 1916." This had been a comparatively moderate document dominated by the party's right wing, placing emphasis upon immediate ameliorative demands rather than long-term universal objectives.

The fledgling organization was immediately struck by personal animosity and factional squabbling. Social Democrat John Spargo became involved in an argument with Mrs. Henry Gould, who had previously pledged $5,000 in seed money to the new organization. She bolted the gathering, never writing the group its promised check. The Social Democrats also clashed with Hopkins and his Progressive Party associates, with the two groups at loggerheads over their mutual desire to dominate the new organization.

=== First Convention, Chicago, March 6–8, 1918 ===
The Second Convention of the National Party adopted a formal organizational constitution and revised platform for the organization. The group was to be headed by a National Chairman, four Vice Chairmen, and a National Executive Committee of 29. Former Socialist David C. Coates was elected National Chairman, while J. A. H. Hopkins of Morristown, New Jersey was elected First Vice Chairman and Chairman of the National Executive Committee.

== Prominent members ==
- Marie Caroline Brehm (Suffragist)
- Willis G. Calderwood (Prohibition Party), candidate for U.S. Senate (1918)
- David C. Coates (ex-Socialist Party)
- E. E. Lobeck (Prohibition Party), state Senator and Representative, candidate for governor (1918)
- William F. Cochran (Baltimore real estate developer)
- J. A. H. Hopkins (Progressive Party)
- Walter Lafferty (Republican Party), U.S. Representative, candidate for U.S. House of Representatives (1918)
- Jeannette Rankin (Suffragist), U.S. Representative, candidate for U.S. Senate (1918)
- Algie Martin Simons (ex-Socialist Party)
- John Spargo (ex-Socialist Party)
- Susie Williamson Stageberg, (Prohibition Party), husband was a candidate for Governor of Minnesota (1918)
- J. G. Phelps Stokes (ex-Socialist Party)

== See also ==
- Committee of 48
- Social Democratic League of America
