= W. J. Ghent =

American socialist and author

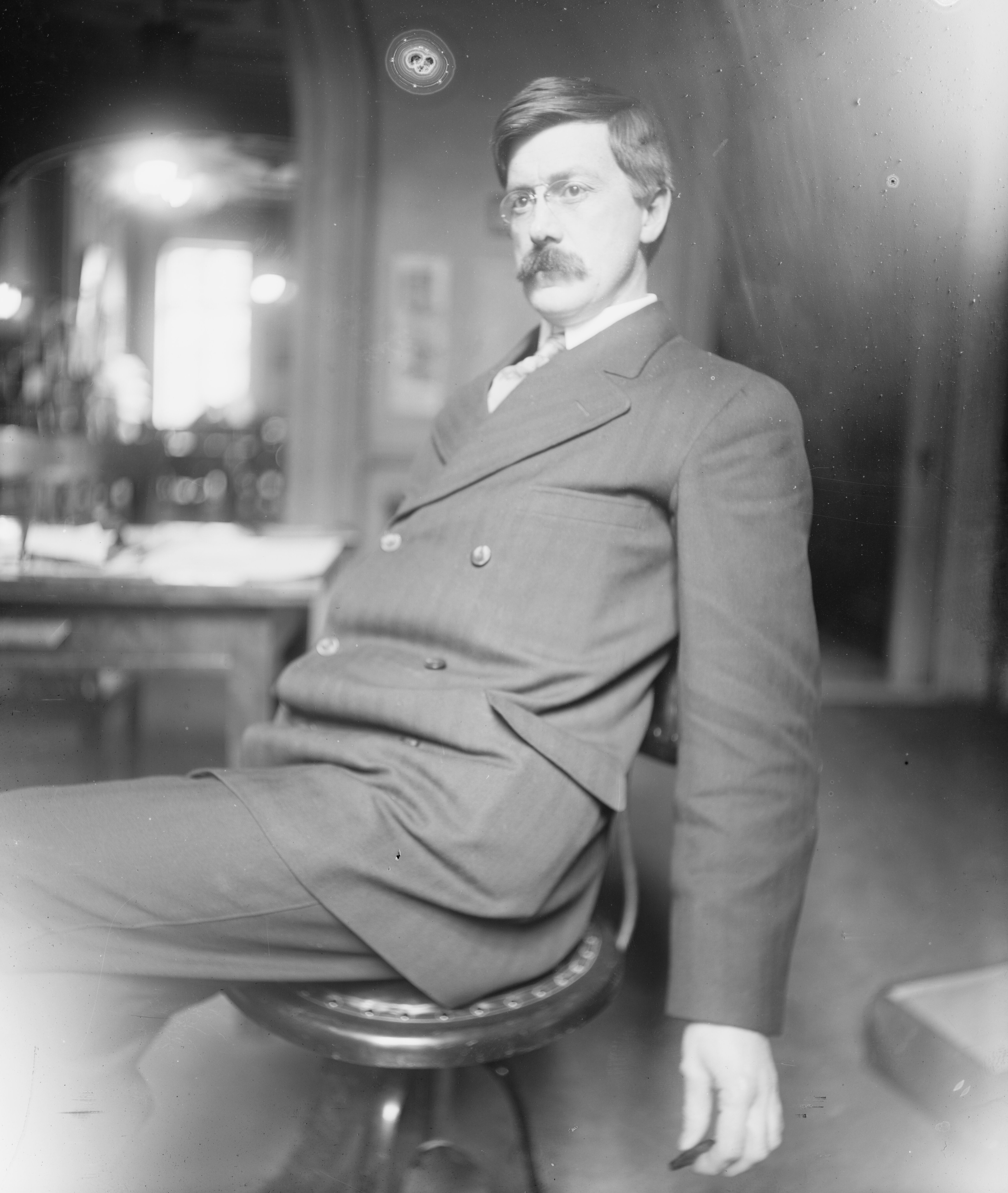
W. J. Ghent

William James Ghent (April 29, 1866 – July 10, 1942) was an American socialist journalist and writer. His main focus was on socialism and on the history of the Westward Expansion of the early United States.

== Biography ==
=== Early years ===
William James Ghent was born on April 29, 1866, in Frankfort, Clinton County, Indiana, the son of Ira Keith Ghent and Mary Elizabeth Palmer. Ghent's ancestors had already been residents of America for a century, having settled in the state of North Carolina prior to the American Revolution.

He attended public school and learned the printing trade as a young man, working as a compositor for a number of newspapers and magazines before moving into the field of journalism.

=== Socialist activities ===
Ghent became interested in socialism in 1892, becoming active in a Bellamy Club, and initially espoused the English evolutionary socialist ideas of Fabianism. Ghent would go on to contribute to such publications as the New York-based magazine The American Fabian from 1897 to 1898. Ghent's initial foray into politics came in the late 1890s, when he served as an aid to Samuel Jones during his campaigns to become Mayor of Toledo, Ohio, and Governor of Ohio.

On March 6, 1903, the Collectivist Society of New York was organized. Ghent was a member of its executive committee.

Ghent remained aloof from the organized socialist movement for more than a decade, finally joining the Socialist Party of America (SPA) in 1904. At the time of his entry into the SPA, Ghent was already well known among American socialists for his authorship of the widely read radical tome Our Benevolent Feudalism (1902). He soon followed this with another well recognized volume, 1904's Mass and Class.

Ghent was recognized as an excellent writer but was shy and a poor public speaker. The disconnect between his literary eloquence and reluctance to speak in public caused many of those who came into casual contact with Ghent to think him aloof.

In 1906 with funds provided by philanthropist Caroline A. Sherfey Rand, a socialist workers education facility was launched in New York City called the Rand School of Social Science. An April 1906 meeting of the Board of Directors determined that the hiring of a paid executive to run the school was required and Ghent was nominated for the post. Although he feared that this job would take away time necessary for writing, Ghent finally relented and took the position as Secretary. Ghent and the Rand School set up shop on the first two floors of a building located at 112 East 19th Street and the school officially opened in September of that same year.

As an intellectual, the activities of the Intercollegiate Socialist Society (ISS) in bringing socialist ideas to college campuses held great appeal for Ghent and he became Secretary of that organization. In the summer of 1907 Ghent made the facility of the recently Rand School the headquarters of the ISS as well.

Over time personal friction developed between Ghent and Algernon Lee, editor of The Worker, the main English-language Socialist weekly in New York City and Ghent was pushed into resigning as the school's chief in the fall of 1909. Ghent was effectively pushed upstairs, elected as President of the Board of Directors of the American Socialist Society, the legal entity behind the Rand School, and Algernon Lee was elected as the school's new Secretary.

In 1911 Ghent left for Washington, D.C., to work as a secretary to Socialist Congressman Victor L. Berger. Following his stint with Rep. Berger, Ghent returned to journalism, contributing to the Washington, D.C., socialist weekly The National Socialist before moving to the Southeastern Kansas town of Girard to join the editorial staff of the mass circulation Appeal to Reason.

=== Break with radicalism ===
Ghent broke with the Socialist Party over that organization's staunch opposition to World War I despite America's entry into that conflict in April 1917. Ghent became active in the pro-war arm of the labor movement, joining American Federation of Labor President Samuel Gompers on the executive committee of the American Alliance for Labor and Democracy from 1917 through 1919.

In the early 1920s Ghent emerged as an outspoken public opponent of the fledgling American Communist movement. In 1923 Princeton University Press gathered a modified set of his essays from such magazines as The Weekly Review and The Independent under hard covers as a book entitled The Reds Bring Reaction. Ghent argued in this book that the ongoing wave of conservatism and anti-union legislation which swept America in the years after World War I was in large measure a response to the "theatricism and charlantry" of the revolutionary left.

Ghent wrote:

"The revolutionary Communist, for all his stage-play, is a fanatic and a firebrand. So long as society insists upon keeping on hand such stores of inflammable material in the form of large sections of the working class steeped in privation and misery, it must expect, from time to time, what follows from the touch of flame to tinder. But the chief danger lies in the fact that the tumult and shouting of the Left inevitably strengthens the Reaction of the Right.

Despite this perspective and his continued separation from the Socialist Party, Ghent reaffirmed his commitment to the principles of social democracy, declaring that "the theory of the class struggle...seemed to be valid, when rightfully understood, as it still seems," despite the fact that "the abuse of that theory might well set the world in flames."

Ghent gradually became estranged from the radical political movement, turning his attention to the history of the American West. He would be the author of three monographs on the topic. Although he never rejoined the Socialist Party of America, he did in 1936 join the Social Democratic Federation, which was established in a split by party moderates from the SPA.

=== Death and legacy ===
William James Ghent died on July 10, 1942, at his home, 1809 Belmont Street, N.W. in Washington, D.C. and was survived by his wife, Amy M. Ghent. Burial was at Fort Lincoln Cemetery, Brentwood, Prince George's County, Maryland. Ghent's papers reside with the Manuscript Division of the Library of Congress in Washington.

== Works ==
- Our Benevolent Feudalism. New York: Macmillan, 1902.
- Mass and Class: A Survey of Social Divisions. New York: Macmillan, 1904.
- Why Aren't You a Socialist? New York : Socialist Party, n.d. [190-?].
- Socialism and Success: Some Uninvited Messages. New York: John Lane Co., 1910.
- To Skeptics and Doubters. New York: Intercollegiate Socialist Society, 1911.
- Old Age Pension. Chicago : National Office of the Socialist Party, 1911.
- The National Socialist Handbook No. 2. Washington, DC: National Socialist, 1913.
- The Appeal Almanac and Arsenal of Facts for 1915. (Editor.) Girard, KS: Appeal to Reason, 1915.
- Appeal Socialist Classics. (Editor.) Girard, KS: Appeal to Reason, 1916.
- Democratic Defense: A Practical Program for Socialism. (Chief author.) Socialist Party Bulletin, vol. 1, no. 2 (March 1917), pg. 14.
- The Appeal Almanac and Arsenal of Facts for 1917. (Editor.) Girard, KS: Appeal to Reason, 1917.
- The New Appeal Almanac for 1918. (Editor.) Girard, KS: New Appeal, 1918.
- The Reds Bring Reaction. Princeton, NJ: Princeton University Press, 1923.
- "Daniel DeLeon," from Dictionary of American Biography. American Council of Learned Societies, 1928.
- The Road to Oregon: A Chronicle of the Great Emigrant Trail. New York, Longmans, Green and Co., 1929.
- Broken Hand: The Life Story of Thomas Fitzpatrick, Chief of the Mountain Men. With LeRoy R. Hafen. Denver: Old West Publishing Company, 1931.
- The Early Far West: A Narrative Outline, 1540-1850. New York: Longmans, Green and Co., 1931.
