= Henry Slobodin =

American lawyer

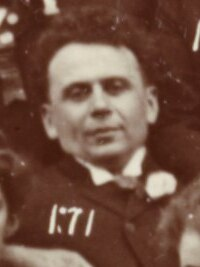
Slobodin at the first Socialist Party of America convention in Chicago, 1904

Henry (also known as Harry) Leon Slobodin (1866 – December 25, 1951) was an American attorney, socialist activist and frequent candidate for public office from New York.

== Biography ==
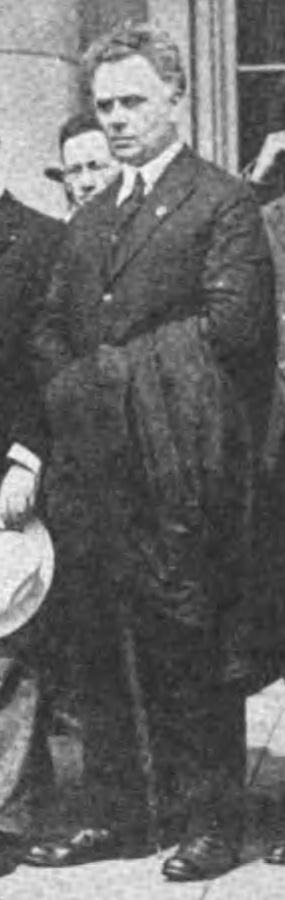
Slobodin c. 1918

Slobodin was born in Rostov, Russia in 1866. He emigrated to the United States in 1890 and graduated from the New York University School of Law in 1896.

Slobodin was active in the Socialist Labor Party of America, serving as National Secretary before leaving in 1899 to join the Social Democratic Party of America alongside other socialist activists like Morris Hillquit. Slobodin was secretary of the eastern or Rochester branch of the SDP before it merged with dissident Lassallean members of the SLP to form the Socialist Party of America.

Thereafter, Slobodin served as chairman of the Socialist Party of New York for 15 years before breaking with the party over its opposition to World War I, co-founding the Social Democratic League of America. During and after the war, he consulted the White House on Russia and Central Europe.

Slobodin died in Lansdale, Pennsylvania on Christmas of 1951.
