= 1892 United States presidential election in Pennsylvania =

- November 8, 1892
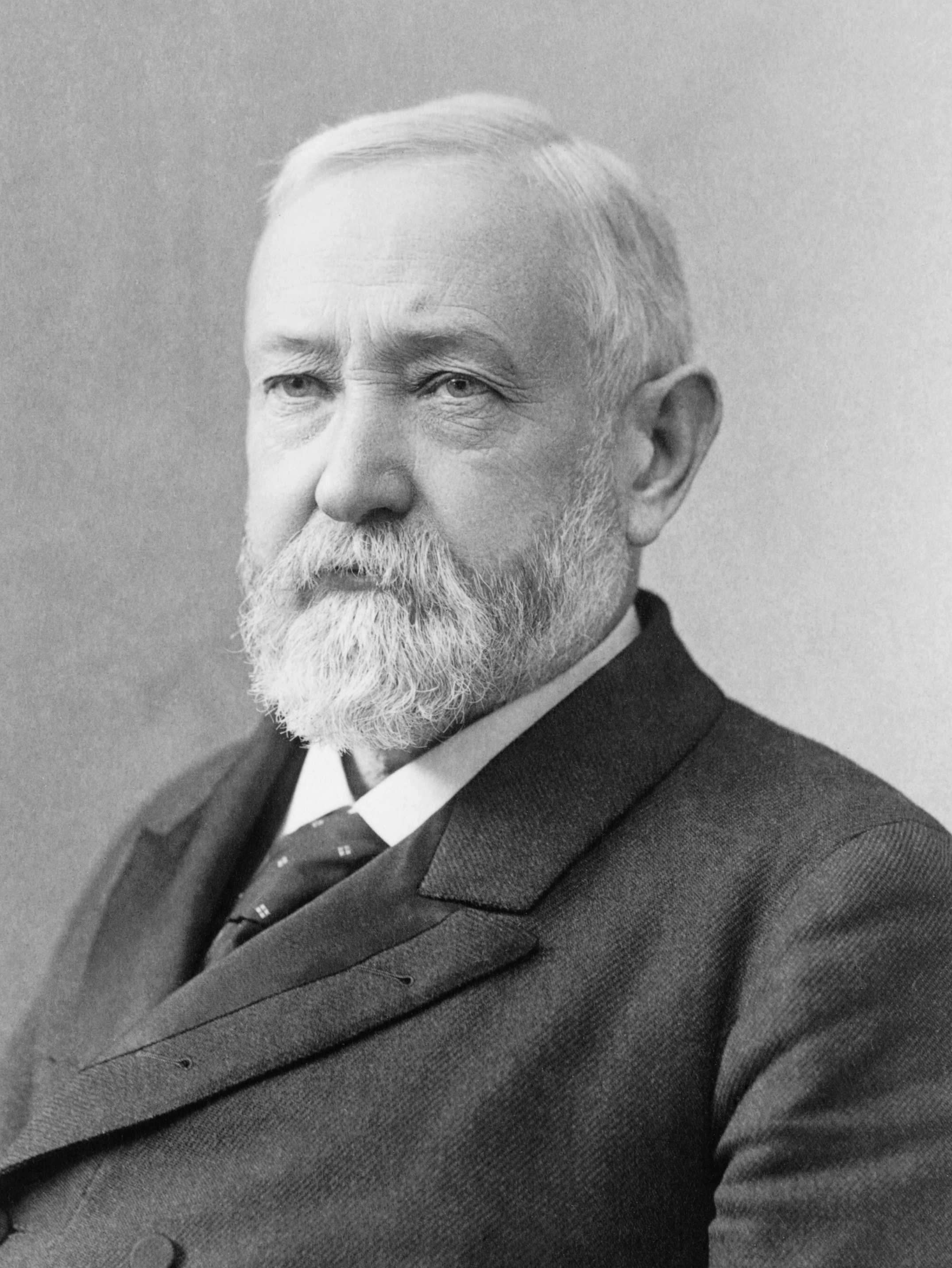

| Nominee | Benjamin Harrison | Grover Cleveland |
| Party | Republican | Democratic |
| Home state | Indiana | New York |
| Running mate | Whitelaw Reid | Adlai Stevenson I |
| Electoral vote | 32 | 0 |
| Popular vote | 516,011 | 452,264 |
| Percentage | 51.45% | 45.09% |
County results
Harrison
40–50%
50–60%
60–70%
Cleveland
40–50%
50–60%
60–70%
70–80%
President before election
Benjamin Harrison
Republican
Elected President
Grover Cleveland
Democratic

A presidential election was held in Pennsylvania on November 8, 1892, as part of the 1892 United States presidential election. Voters chose 32 representatives, or electors to the Electoral College, who voted for president and vice president.

Pennsylvania voted for the Republican nominee, incumbent President Benjamin Harrison, over the Democratic nominee, former President Grover Cleveland, who was running for a second, non-consecutive term. Harrison won Pennsylvania by a margin of 6.36%. This remains the last election where a Democratic candidate won northeastern Wayne County, which had regularly voted Democratic during the Third Party System.

With 51.45% of the popular vote, Pennsylvania would prove to be Harrison's fourth strongest victory in terms of percentage in the popular vote after Vermont, Maine and Massachusetts.

== Results ==
1892 United States presidential election in Pennsylvania
| Party | Candidate | Votes | Percentage | Electoral votes |
|---|---|---|---|---|
| Republican | Benjamin Harrison (incumbent) | 516,011 | 51.45% | 32 |
| Democratic | Grover Cleveland | 452,264 | 45.09% | 0 |
| Prohibition | John Bidwell | 25,123 | 2.50% | 0 |
| People's | James B. Weaver | 8,714 | 0.87% | 0 |
| Socialist Labor | Simon Wing | 898 | 0.09% | 0 |
| Totals | | 1,003,010 | 100.0% | 32 |

=== Results by county ===
| County | Benjamin Harrison Republican | | Grover Cleveland Democratic | | John Bidwell Prohibition | | James B. Weaver People's | | Simon Wing Socialist Labor | | Margin | | Total votes cast |
| County | # | % | # | % | # | % | # | % | # | % | # | % | Total votes cast |
|---|---|---|---|---|---|---|---|---|---|---|---|---|---|
| Adams | 3,384 | 47.20% | 3,716 | 51.83% | 13 | 0.18% | 56 | 0.78% | 1 | 0.01% | -332 | -4.63% | 7,170 |
| Allegheny | 45,788 | 58.33% | 30,867 | 39.32% | 1,158 | 1.48% | 578 | 0.74% | 113 | 0.14% | 14,921 | 19.01% | 78,504 |
| Armstrong | 4,709 | 55.60% | 3,512 | 41.46% | 199 | 2.35% | 46 | 0.54% | 4 | 0.05% | 1,197 | 14.13% | 8,470 |
| Beaver | 4,890 | 52.04% | 3,822 | 40.68% | 322 | 3.43% | 354 | 3.77% | 8 | 0.09% | 1,068 | 11.37% | 9,396 |
| Bedford | 4,301 | 53.08% | 3,684 | 45.46% | 104 | 1.28% | 14 | 0.17% | 0 | 0.00% | 617 | 7.61% | 8,103 |
| Berks | 10,077 | 34.76% | 18,602 | 64.16% | 248 | 0.86% | 61 | 0.21% | 3 | 0.01% | -8,525 | -29.41% | 28,991 |
| Blair | 7,407 | 56.75% | 5,265 | 40.34% | 309 | 2.37% | 49 | 0.38% | 22 | 0.17% | 2,142 | 16.41% | 13,052 |
| Bradford | 8,132 | 63.10% | 4,080 | 31.66% | 527 | 4.09% | 140 | 1.09% | 9 | 0.07% | 4,052 | 31.44% | 12,888 |
| Bucks | 8,230 | 48.72% | 8,390 | 49.67% | 257 | 1.52% | 11 | 0.07% | 4 | 0.02% | -160 | -0.95% | 16,892 |
| Butler | 5,019 | 50.17% | 4,161 | 41.59% | 636 | 6.36% | 180 | 1.80% | 8 | 0.08% | 858 | 8.58% | 10,004 |
| Cambria | 6,020 | 47.42% | 6,259 | 49.30% | 265 | 2.09% | 147 | 1.16% | 5 | 0.04% | -239 | -1.88% | 12,696 |
| Cameron | 829 | 52.37% | 701 | 44.28% | 43 | 2.72% | 10 | 0.63% | 0 | 0.00% | 128 | 8.09% | 1,583 |
| Carbon | 3,179 | 45.68% | 3,541 | 50.88% | 113 | 1.62% | 116 | 1.67% | 10 | 0.14% | -362 | -5.20% | 6,959 |
| Centre | 3,698 | 42.72% | 4,624 | 53.42% | 316 | 3.65% | 18 | 0.21% | 0 | 0.00% | -926 | -10.70% | 8,656 |
| Chester | 10,982 | 55.57% | 7,850 | 39.72% | 901 | 4.56% | 28 | 0.14% | 3 | 0.02% | 3,132 | 15.85% | 19,764 |
| Clarion | 2,543 | 39.23% | 3,746 | 57.79% | 153 | 2.36% | 39 | 0.60% | 1 | 0.02% | -1,203 | -18.56% | 6,482 |
| Clearfield | 4,765 | 40.72% | 6,108 | 52.20% | 646 | 5.52% | 174 | 1.49% | 9 | 0.08% | -1,343 | -11.48% | 11,702 |
| Clinton | 2,572 | 43.91% | 3,075 | 52.49% | 183 | 3.12% | 25 | 0.43% | 3 | 0.05% | -503 | -8.59% | 5,858 |
| Columbia | 2,336 | 30.56% | 4,929 | 64.47% | 351 | 4.59% | 24 | 0.31% | 5 | 0.07% | -2,593 | -33.92% | 7,645 |
| Crawford | 7,152 | 47.30% | 6,166 | 40.78% | 729 | 4.82% | 1,065 | 7.04% | 10 | 0.07% | 986 | 6.52% | 15,122 |
| Cumberland | 4,520 | 44.06% | 5,446 | 53.09% | 282 | 2.75% | 11 | 0.11% | 0 | 0.00% | -926 | -9.03% | 10,259 |
| Dauphin | 11,010 | 57.47% | 7,520 | 39.25% | 596 | 3.11% | 22 | 0.11% | 9 | 0.05% | 3,490 | 18.22% | 19,157 |
| Delaware | 9,272 | 60.72% | 5,520 | 36.15% | 462 | 3.03% | 14 | 0.09% | 1 | 0.01% | 3,752 | 24.57% | 15,269 |
| Elk | 1,438 | 38.94% | 2,126 | 57.57% | 80 | 2.17% | 48 | 1.30% | 1 | 0.03% | -688 | -18.63% | 3,693 |
| Erie | 8,918 | 49.76% | 7,589 | 42.34% | 702 | 3.92% | 686 | 3.83% | 28 | 0.16% | 1,329 | 7.42% | 17,923 |
| Fayette | 6,859 | 46.17% | 7,508 | 50.54% | 393 | 2.65% | 75 | 0.50% | 21 | 0.14% | -649 | -4.37% | 14,856 |
| Forest | 938 | 54.31% | 660 | 38.22% | 108 | 6.25% | 20 | 1.16% | 1 | 0.06% | 278 | 16.10% | 1,727 |
| Franklin | 5,725 | 52.57% | 4,965 | 45.59% | 183 | 1.68% | 14 | 0.13% | 4 | 0.04% | 760 | 6.98% | 10,891 |
| Fulton | 918 | 42.74% | 1,210 | 56.33% | 20 | 0.93% | 0 | 0.00% | 0 | 0.00% | -292 | -13.59% | 2,148 |
| Greene | 2,126 | 33.39% | 3,977 | 62.46% | 127 | 1.99% | 136 | 2.14% | 1 | 0.02% | -1,851 | -29.07% | 6,367 |
| Huntingdon | 3,994 | 57.66% | 2,675 | 38.62% | 150 | 2.17% | 108 | 1.56% | 0 | 0.00% | 1,319 | 19.04% | 6,927 |
| Indiana | 4,559 | 61.18% | 2,134 | 28.64% | 308 | 4.13% | 445 | 5.97% | 6 | 0.08% | 2,425 | 32.54% | 7,452 |
| Jefferson | 4,100 | 50.41% | 3,251 | 39.97% | 416 | 5.11% | 360 | 4.43% | 6 | 0.07% | 849 | 10.44% | 8,133 |
| Juniata | 1,621 | 47.58% | 1,695 | 49.75% | 85 | 2.49% | 5 | 0.15% | 1 | 0.03% | -74 | -2.17% | 3,407 |
| Lackawanna | 10,729 | 48.38% | 10,351 | 46.67% | 999 | 4.50% | 67 | 0.30% | 32 | 0.14% | 378 | 1.70% | 22,178 |
| Lancaster | 20,126 | 64.46% | 10,326 | 33.07% | 683 | 2.19% | 81 | 0.26% | 6 | 0.02% | 9,800 | 31.39% | 31,222 |
| Lawrence | 4,385 | 60.10% | 2,336 | 32.02% | 449 | 6.15% | 126 | 1.73% | 0 | 0.00% | 2,049 | 28.08% | 7,296 |
| Lebanon | 5,403 | 59.11% | 3,409 | 37.29% | 301 | 3.29% | 25 | 0.27% | 3 | 0.03% | 1,994 | 21.81% | 9,141 |
| Lehigh | 7,089 | 41.65% | 9,699 | 56.99% | 213 | 1.25% | 11 | 0.06% | 7 | 0.04% | -2,610 | -15.34% | 17,019 |
| Luzerne | 14,118 | 45.21% | 15,734 | 50.38% | 1,299 | 4.16% | 48 | 0.15% | 30 | 0.10% | -1,616 | -5.17% | 31,229 |
| Lycoming | 5,736 | 40.30% | 7,532 | 52.92% | 899 | 6.32% | 42 | 0.30% | 25 | 0.18% | -1,796 | -12.62% | 14,234 |
| McKean | 3,594 | 50.01% | 2,843 | 39.56% | 464 | 6.46% | 274 | 3.81% | 12 | 0.17% | 751 | 10.45% | 7,187 |
| Mercer | 5,874 | 50.80% | 4,931 | 42.65% | 637 | 5.51% | 117 | 1.01% | 3 | 0.03% | 943 | 8.16% | 11,562 |
| Mifflin | 2,175 | 49.82% | 2,029 | 46.47% | 153 | 3.50% | 7 | 0.16% | 2 | 0.05% | 146 | 3.34% | 4,366 |
| Monroe | 1,020 | 24.53% | 3,078 | 74.01% | 48 | 1.15% | 13 | 0.31% | 0 | 0.00% | -2,058 | -49.48% | 4,159 |
| Montgomery | 13,591 | 49.10% | 13,611 | 49.17% | 447 | 1.61% | 22 | 0.08% | 11 | 0.04% | -20 | -0.07% | 27,682 |
| Montour | 1,108 | 35.97% | 1,877 | 60.94% | 51 | 1.66% | 44 | 1.43% | 0 | 0.00% | -769 | -24.97% | 3,080 |
| Northampton | 6,892 | 39.21% | 10,320 | 58.71% | 312 | 1.77% | 49 | 0.28% | 6 | 0.03% | -3,428 | -19.50% | 17,579 |
| Northumberland | 6,170 | 44.98% | 6,942 | 50.61% | 536 | 3.91% | 67 | 0.49% | 2 | 0.01% | -772 | -5.63% | 13,717 |
| Perry | 3,120 | 52.20% | 2,705 | 45.26% | 151 | 2.53% | 1 | 0.02% | 0 | 0.00% | 415 | 6.94% | 5,977 |
| Philadelphia | 116,685 | 57.45% | 84,470 | 41.59% | 1,309 | 0.64% | 251 | 0.12% | 387 | 0.19% | 32,215 | 15.86% | 203,102 |
| Pike | 477 | 28.87% | 1,150 | 69.61% | 23 | 1.39% | 1 | 0.06% | 1 | 0.06% | -673 | -40.74% | 1,652 |
| Potter | 2,315 | 46.91% | 1,699 | 34.43% | 135 | 2.74% | 785 | 15.91% | 1 | 0.02% | 616 | 12.48% | 4,935 |
| Schuylkill | 11,426 | 44.94% | 13,677 | 53.80% | 290 | 1.14% | 23 | 0.09% | 8 | 0.03% | -2,251 | -8.85% | 25,424 |
| Snyder | 2,307 | 59.92% | 1,511 | 39.25% | 30 | 0.78% | 2 | 0.05% | 0 | 0.00% | 796 | 20.68% | 3,850 |
| Somerset | 4,670 | 65.00% | 2,262 | 31.48% | 206 | 2.87% | 45 | 0.63% | 2 | 0.03% | 2,408 | 33.51% | 7,185 |
| Sullivan | 873 | 39.08% | 1,266 | 56.67% | 82 | 3.67% | 13 | 0.58% | 0 | 0.00% | -393 | -17.59% | 2,234 |
| Susquehanna | 4,531 | 53.14% | 3,383 | 39.67% | 551 | 6.46% | 61 | 0.72% | 1 | 0.01% | 1,148 | 13.46% | 8,527 |
| Tioga | 6,706 | 64.77% | 2,921 | 28.21% | 345 | 3.33% | 363 | 3.51% | 18 | 0.17% | 3,785 | 36.56% | 10,353 |
| Union | 2,308 | 58.02% | 1,569 | 39.44% | 95 | 2.39% | 6 | 0.15% | 0 | 0.00% | 739 | 18.58% | 3,978 |
| Venango | 4,099 | 49.31% | 3,288 | 39.55% | 588 | 7.07% | 326 | 3.92% | 12 | 0.14% | 811 | 9.76% | 8,313 |
| Warren | 3,838 | 51.91% | 2,735 | 36.99% | 461 | 6.23% | 358 | 4.84% | 2 | 0.03% | 1,103 | 14.92% | 7,394 |
| Washington | 8,060 | 51.24% | 6,847 | 43.53% | 549 | 3.49% | 261 | 1.66% | 12 | 0.08% | 1,213 | 7.71% | 15,729 |
| Wayne | 2,690 | 44.37% | 2,915 | 48.09% | 437 | 7.21% | 17 | 0.28% | 3 | 0.05% | -225 | -3.71% | 6,062 |
| Westmoreland | 10,804 | 48.84% | 10,747 | 48.58% | 409 | 1.85% | 146 | 0.66% | 14 | 0.06% | 57 | 0.26% | 22,120 |
| Wyoming | 2,029 | 49.82% | 1,905 | 46.77% | 126 | 3.09% | 13 | 0.32% | 0 | 0.00% | 124 | 3.04% | 4,073 |
| York | 9,052 | 40.59% | 12,822 | 57.50% | 411 | 1.84% | 13 | 0.06% | 2 | 0.01% | -3,770 | -16.91% | 22,300 |
| Totals | 516,011 | 51.45% | 452,264 | 45.09% | 25,074 | 2.50% | 8,757 | 0.87% | 899 | 0.09% | 63,747 | 6.36% | 1,003,005 |

== See also ==
- United States presidential elections in Pennsylvania
