= 1892 United States presidential election in New York =

- November 8, 1892
- Turnout: 86.3% ▼6.0 pp

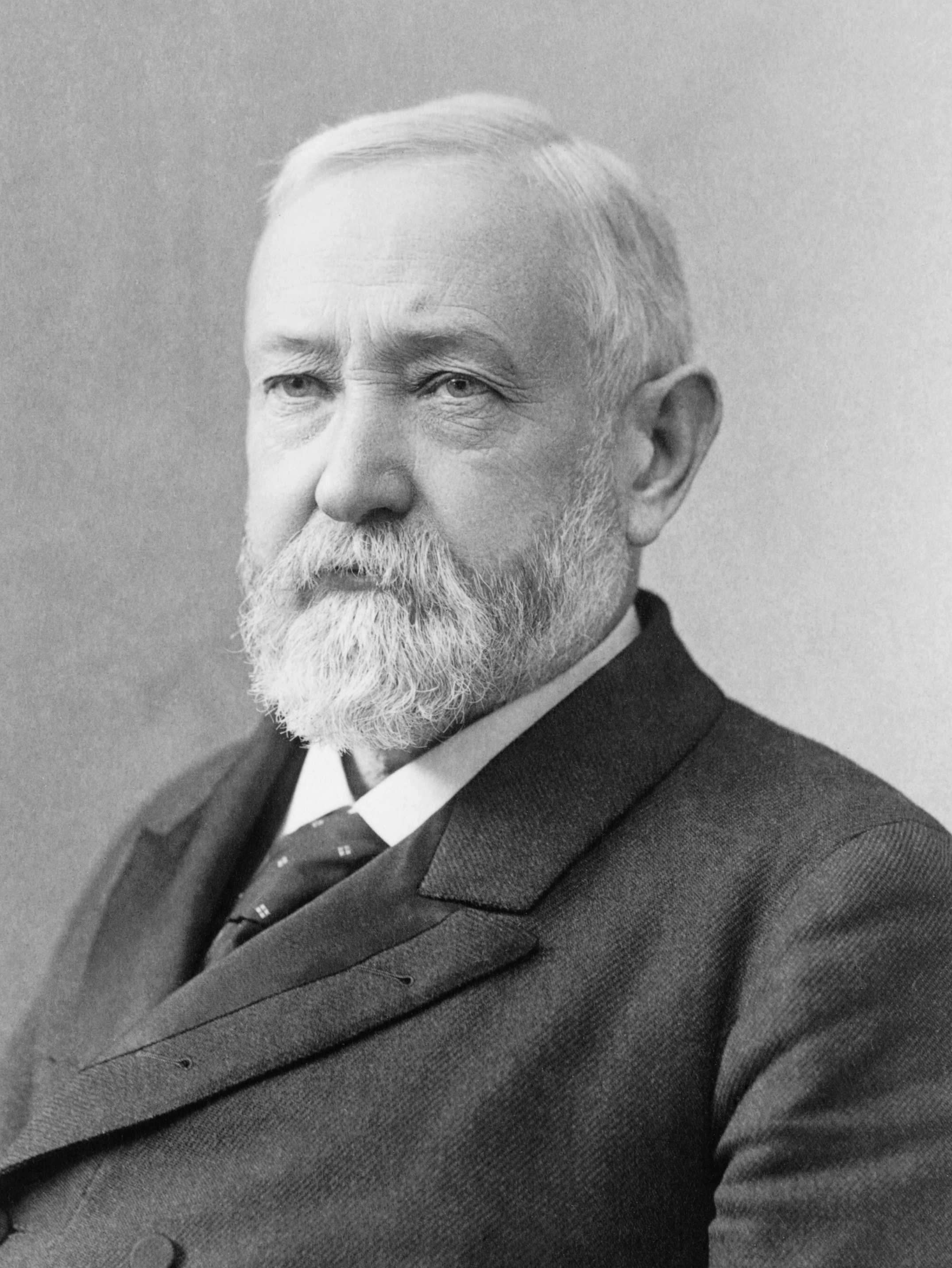
Nominee	Grover Cleveland	Benjamin Harrison
Party	Democratic	Republican
Home state	New York	Indiana
Running mate	Adlai Stevenson I	Whitelaw Reid
Electoral vote	36	0
Popular vote	654,868	609,350
Percentage	48.99%	45.58%
County results
Cleveland
40–50%
50–60%
60–70%
Harrison
40–50%
50–60%
60–70%
President before election
Benjamin Harrison
Republican
Elected President
Grover Cleveland
Democratic

The 1892 United States presidential election in New York took place on November 8, 1892. All contemporary 44 states were part of the 1892 United States presidential election. Voters chose 36 electors to the Electoral College, which selected the president and vice president.

New York was won by the Democratic nominees, former President Grover Cleveland of New York and his running mate former Congressman and Assistant Postmaster General Adlai Stevenson I of Illinois. Cleveland and Stevenson defeated the Republican nominees, incumbent President Benjamin Harrison of Indiana and his running mate U.S. Ambassador to France Whitelaw Reid of Ohio.

Also running a significant campaign that year was the Populist Party candidate, Congressman James B. Weaver of Ohio with his running mate state attorney general James G. Field of Virginia, although Weaver's primarily Western-based campaign did not perform strongly in New York. Despite receiving 8.51% nationally and winning electoral votes from six states, Weaver finished in fifth place in New York State, with only 1.23 percent of the vote, behind fourth-place Socialist Labor candidate Simon Wing’s 1.34 percent.

Cleveland carried New York State with 48.99 percent of the vote to Harrison's 45.58 percent, a victory margin of 3.41 points. In a distant third came the Prohibition Party candidate John Bidwell with 2.86 percent. New York weighed in for this election as less than one percentage point more Democratic than the national average. The Democratic win of New York’s electoral votes marked a personal comeback for Grover Cleveland in his home state, as he had narrowly won the state in his initial 1884 presidential campaign, but a narrow defeat here in 1888 had cost him the 1888 presidential election, partially the result of strong opposition to Cleveland from the Tammany Hall machine which dominated New York politics at the time.

Cleveland’s relatively narrow statewide victory relied heavily on a strong margin of victory in New York City, receiving more than 60% of the vote in New York County along with victories in Kings County, Queens County, and Richmond County. Cleveland also won nearby Westchester County and Rockland County. Harrison fared better upstate, where he won most counties, although Cleveland carried several upstate counties including Erie County, home to the city of Buffalo, and Albany County, home to the state capital of Albany.

== Results ==
1892 United States presidential election in New York
Party	Candidate	Running mate	Popular vote		Electoral vote	
Party	Candidate	Running mate	Count	%	Count	%
Democratic	Grover Cleveland of New York	Adlai E. Stevenson I of Illinois	654,868	48.99%	36	100.00%
Republican	Benjamin Harrison of Indiana	Whitelaw Reid of New York	609,350	45.58%	0	0.00%
Prohibition	John Bidwell of California	James B. Cranfill of Texas	38,190	2.86%	0	0.00%
Socialist Labor	Simon Wing of Massachusetts	Charles H. Matchett of New York	17,956	1.34%	0	0.00%
Populist	James B. Weaver of Iowa	James G. Field of Virginia	16,429	1.23%	0	0.00%
Total			1,336,793	100.00%	36	100.00%

=== Results by county ===
County	Grover Cleveland Democratic		Benjamin Harrison Republican		John Bidwell Prohibition		Simon Wing Socialist Labor		James B. Weaver Populist		Margin		Total votes cast
County	#	%	#	%	#	%	#	%	#	%	#	%	Total votes cast
Albany	18,994	48.99%	18,398	47.46%	649	1.67%	366	0.94%	361	0.93%	596	1.54%	38,768
Allegany	3,128	28.73%	5,678	52.14%	1,042	9.57%	92	0.84%	949	8.72%	-2,550	-23.42%	10,889
Broome	6,040	38.29%	8,259	52.36%	1,088	6.90%	166	1.05%	220	1.39%	-2,219	-14.07%	15,773
Cattaraugus	5,753	38.09%	7,973	52.78%	761	5.04%	139	0.92%	479	3.17%	-2,220	-14.70%	15,105
Cayuga	5,999	38.80%	8,341	53.95%	712	4.61%	144	0.93%	265	1.71%	-2,342	-15.15%	15,461
Chautauqua	6,397	32.20%	11,595	58.37%	1,112	5.60%	189	0.95%	573	2.88%	-5,198	-26.17%	19,866
Chemung	4,661	41.71%	5,410	48.41%	537	4.81%	167	1.49%	400	3.58%	-749	-6.70%	11,175
Chenango	4,273	40.56%	5,378	51.04%	695	6.60%	68	0.65%	122	1.16%	-1,105	-10.49%	10,536
Clinton	4,773	47.03%	5,135	50.60%	112	1.10%	60	0.59%	69	0.68%	-362	-3.57%	10,149
Columbia	5,868	49.70%	5,384	45.60%	341	2.89%	110	0.93%	104	0.88%	484	4.10%	11,807
Cortland	2,907	37.67%	4,134	53.57%	488	6.32%	63	0.82%	125	1.62%	-1,227	-15.90%	7,717
Delaware	4,706	38.90%	6,421	53.07%	688	5.69%	137	1.13%	147	1.21%	-1,715	-14.17%	12,099
Dutchess	8,978	46.05%	9,376	48.09%	713	3.66%	209	1.07%	219	1.12%	-398	-2.04%	19,495
Erie	32,431	47.41%	32,340	47.28%	1,601	2.34%	862	1.26%	1,169	1.71%	91	0.13%	68,403
Essex	2,710	35.30%	4,636	60.39%	160	2.08%	88	1.15%	83	1.08%	-1,926	-25.09%	7,677
Franklin	2,999	33.93%	5,498	62.19%	199	2.25%	65	0.74%	79	0.89%	-2,499	-28.27%	8,840
Fulton	4,293	41.37%	5,368	51.72%	518	4.99%	103	0.99%	96	0.93%	-1,075	-10.36%	10,378
Genesee	3,250	39.40%	4,289	51.99%	456	5.53%	88	1.07%	166	2.01%	-1,039	-12.60%	8,249
Greene	3,771	45.89%	3,914	47.63%	307	3.74%	115	1.40%	110	1.34%	-143	-1.74%	8,217
Hamilton	480	47.11%	454	44.55%	34	3.34%	23	2.26%	28	2.75%	26	2.55%	1,019
Herkimer	5,526	44.37%	6,219	49.94%	425	3.41%	153	1.23%	131	1.05%	-693	-5.56%	12,454
Jefferson	7,181	39.57%	9,856	54.32%	780	4.30%	174	0.96%	155	0.85%	-2,675	-14.74%	18,146
Kings	100,160	56.78%	70,505	39.97%	2,472	1.40%	2,715	1.54%	533	0.30%	29,655	16.81%	176,385
Lewis	3,369	43.98%	3,965	51.76%	207	2.70%	63	0.82%	57	0.74%	-596	-7.78%	7,661
Livingston	3,672	39.18%	4,886	52.13%	439	4.68%	75	0.80%	301	3.21%	-1,214	-12.95%	9,373
Madison	4,054	35.50%	6,533	57.20%	545	4.77%	120	1.05%	169	1.48%	-2,479	-21.71%	11,421
Monroe	17,706	42.68%	21,327	51.41%	1,213	2.92%	548	1.32%	694	1.67%	-3,621	-8.73%	41,488
Montgomery	5,445	46.00%	5,727	48.38%	382	3.23%	138	1.17%	145	1.22%	-282	-2.38%	11,837
New York	175,267	61.50%	98,967	34.73%	2,439	0.86%	5,945	2.09%	2,366	0.83%	76,300	26.77%	284,984
Niagara	6,850	47.12%	6,663	45.83%	677	4.66%	161	1.11%	186	1.28%	187	1.29%	14,537
Oneida	13,552	45.64%	14,359	48.36%	1,054	3.55%	356	1.20%	373	1.26%	-807	-2.72%	29,694
Onondaga	14,900	41.50%	19,008	52.94%	1,115	3.11%	445	1.24%	436	1.21%	-4,108	-11.44%	35,904
Ontario	5,376	42.62%	6,319	50.10%	390	3.09%	115	0.91%	414	3.28%	-943	-7.48%	12,614
Orange	10,421	45.80%	11,081	48.70%	810	3.56%	217	0.95%	225	0.99%	-660	-2.90%	22,754
Orleans	3,065	39.94%	4,013	52.29%	469	6.11%	58	0.76%	69	0.90%	-948	-12.35%	7,674
Oswego	6,729	37.93%	10,012	56.44%	618	3.48%	173	0.98%	207	1.17%	-3,283	-18.51%	17,739
Otsego	6,408	44.70%	7,095	49.49%	620	4.32%	112	0.78%	101	0.70%	-687	-4.79%	14,336
Putnam	1,549	42.92%	1,846	51.15%	136	3.77%	35	0.97%	43	1.19%	-297	-8.23%	3,609
Queens	15,195	54.15%	11,704	41.71%	510	1.82%	425	1.51%	226	0.81%	3,491	12.44%	28,060
Rensselaer	14,879	49.69%	13,666	45.64%	830	2.77%	277	0.93%	290	0.97%	1,213	4.05%	29,942
Richmond	6,122	57.00%	4,091	38.09%	314	2.92%	128	1.19%	86	0.80%	2,031	18.91%	10,741
Rockland	3,789	53.42%	2,909	41.01%	270	3.81%	60	0.85%	65	0.92%	880	12.41%	7,093
Saratoga	5,755	40.40%	7,383	51.83%	743	5.22%	183	1.28%	180	1.26%	-1,628	-11.43%	14,244
Schenectady	4,081	50.66%	3,481	43.22%	284	3.53%	114	1.42%	95	1.18%	600	7.45%	8,055
Schoharie	4,531	55.28%	3,236	39.48%	302	3.68%	65	0.79%	63	0.77%	1,295	15.80%	8,197
Schuyler	1,486	34.15%	2,410	55.39%	292	6.71%	56	1.29%	107	2.46%	-924	-21.24%	4,351
Seneca	3,199	47.70%	3,112	46.40%	233	3.47%	73	1.09%	90	1.34%	87	1.30%	6,707
St. Lawrence	6,156	29.98%	13,177	64.17%	765	3.73%	157	0.76%	280	1.36%	-7,021	-34.19%	20,535
Steuben	8,307	39.74%	10,577	50.61%	1,191	5.70%	221	1.06%	605	2.89%	-2,270	-10.86%	20,901
Suffolk	6,274	44.17%	7,001	49.29%	637	4.48%	151	1.06%	140	0.99%	-727	-5.12%	14,203
Sullivan	3,567	47.00%	3,664	48.28%	207	2.73%	69	0.91%	82	1.08%	-97	-1.28%	7,589
Tioga	2,923	37.92%	4,221	54.76%	398	5.16%	68	0.88%	98	1.27%	-1,298	-16.84%	7,708
Tompkins	3,404	38.62%	4,717	53.52%	483	5.48%	81	0.92%	128	1.45%	-1,313	-14.90%	8,813
Ulster	9,808	48.04%	9,450	46.29%	715	3.50%	206	1.01%	236	1.16%	358	1.75%	20,415
Warren	2,655	39.03%	3,647	53.62%	319	4.69%	67	0.99%	114	1.68%	-992	-14.58%	6,802
Washington	3,731	32.70%	6,794	59.54%	595	5.21%	129	1.13%	161	1.41%	-3,063	-26.84%	11,410
Wayne	4,618	37.77%	6,848	56.01%	481	3.93%	119	0.97%	161	1.32%	-2,230	-18.24%	12,227
Westchester	16,088	51.67%	13,456	43.21%	908	2.92%	339	1.09%	348	1.12%	2,632	8.45%	31,139
Wyoming	2,948	37.01%	4,430	55.61%	387	4.86%	54	0.68%	147	1.85%	-1,482	-18.60%	7,966
Yates	1,711	31.33%	3,014	55.18%	322	5.90%	57	1.04%	358	6.55%	-1,303	-23.86%	5,462
Totals	654,868	48.99%	609,350	45.58%	38,190	2.86%	17,956	1.34%	16,429	1.23%	45,518	3.41%	1,336,793

==== Counties that flipped from Republican to Democratic ====
- Columbia
- Erie
- Hamilton
- Niagara
- Rensselaer
- Schenectady
- Ulster

==== Counties that flipped from Democratic to Republican ====
- Chemung
- Greene

== See also ==
- United States presidential elections in New York
