= 1892 United States presidential election in Massachusetts =

- November 8, 1892
- Turnout: 74.6 ▲2.9 pp
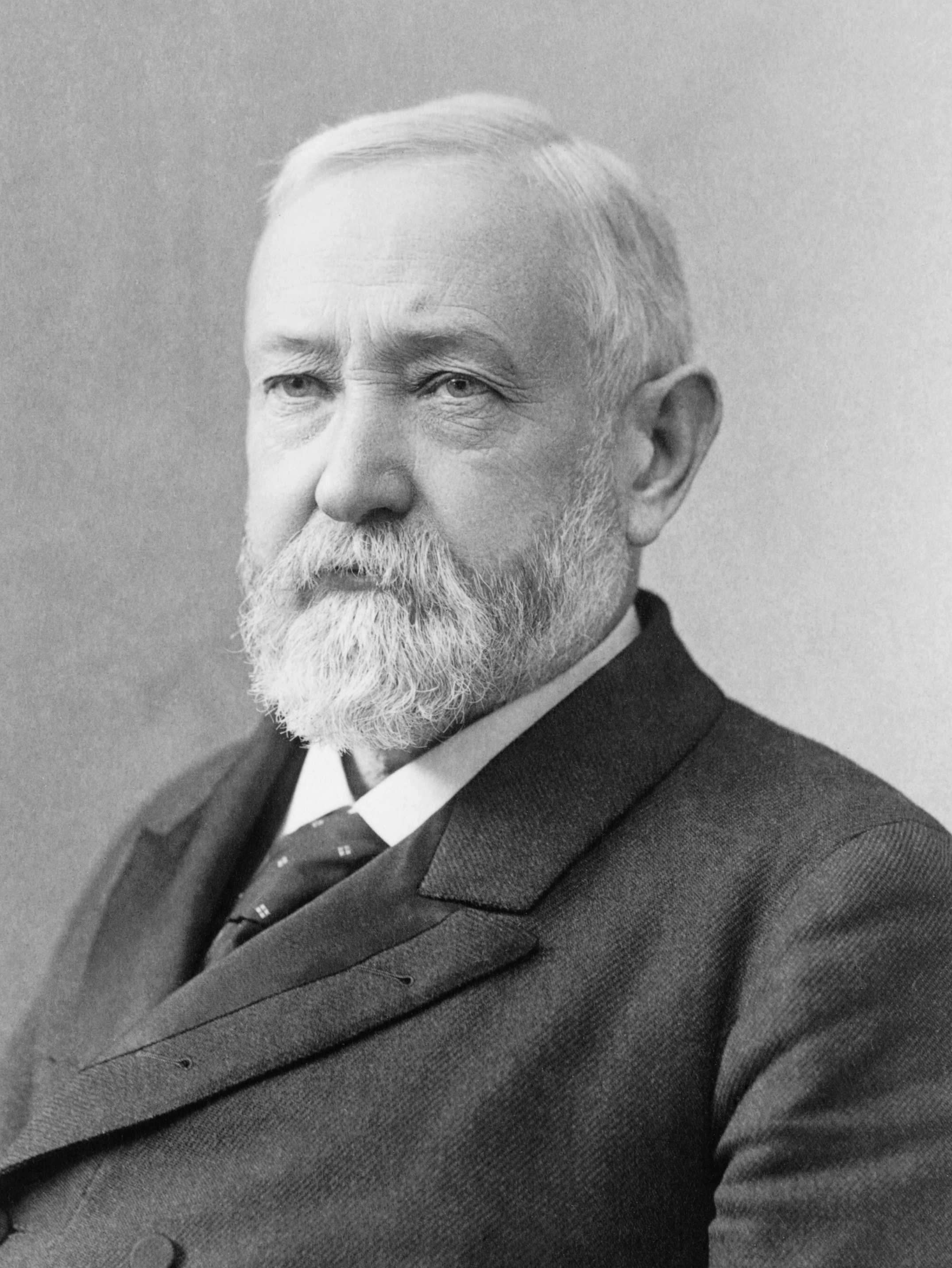

Nominee	Benjamin Harrison	Grover Cleveland
Party	Republican	Democratic
Home state	Indiana	New York
Running mate	Whitelaw Reid	Adlai Stevenson I
Electoral vote	15	0
Popular vote	202,814	176,813
Percentage	51.87%	45.22%

Harrison
40–50%
50–60%
60–70%
70–80%
80–90%
Cleveland
40–50%
50–60%
60–70%
President before election
Benjamin Harrison
Republican
Elected President
Grover Cleveland
Democratic

The 1892 United States presidential election in Massachusetts took place on November 8, 1892, as part of the 1892 United States presidential election. Voters chose 15 representatives, or electors to the Electoral College, who voted for president and vice president.

Massachusetts voted for the Republican nominee, incumbent President Benjamin Harrison, over the Democratic nominee, former President Grover Cleveland, who was running for a second, non-consecutive term. Harrison won the state by a narrow margin of 6.65%.

With 51.87% of the popular vote, Massachusetts would prove to be Harrison's third strongest victory in terms of percentage in the popular vote after neighboring Vermont and Maine.

As of 2024, this remains the last presidential election in which Massachusetts voted Republican while neighboring New York voted Democratic.

== Results ==
1892 United States presidential election in Massachusetts
Party	Candidate	Running mate	Popular vote		Electoral vote	
Party	Candidate	Running mate	Count	%	Count	%
Republican	Benjamin Harrison of Indiana	Whitelaw Reid of New York	202,814	51.87%	15	100.00%
Democratic	Grover Cleveland of New York (incumbent)	Adlai Ewing Stevenson I of Illinois	176,813	45.22%	0	0.00%
Prohibition	John Bidwell of California	James Britton Cranfill of Texas	7,539	1.93%	0	0.00%
Populist	James Baird Weaver of Iowa	James Gaven Field of Virginia	3,210	0.82%	0	0.00%
Socialist Labor	Simon Wing of Massachusetts	Charles Horatio Matchett of New York	649	0.16%	0	0.00%
N/A	Others	Others	3	0.01%	0	0.00%
Total			391,028	100.00%	15	100.00%

== See also ==
- United States presidential elections in Massachusetts
