= 1892 Socialist Labor National Convention =

- 1892 presidential election
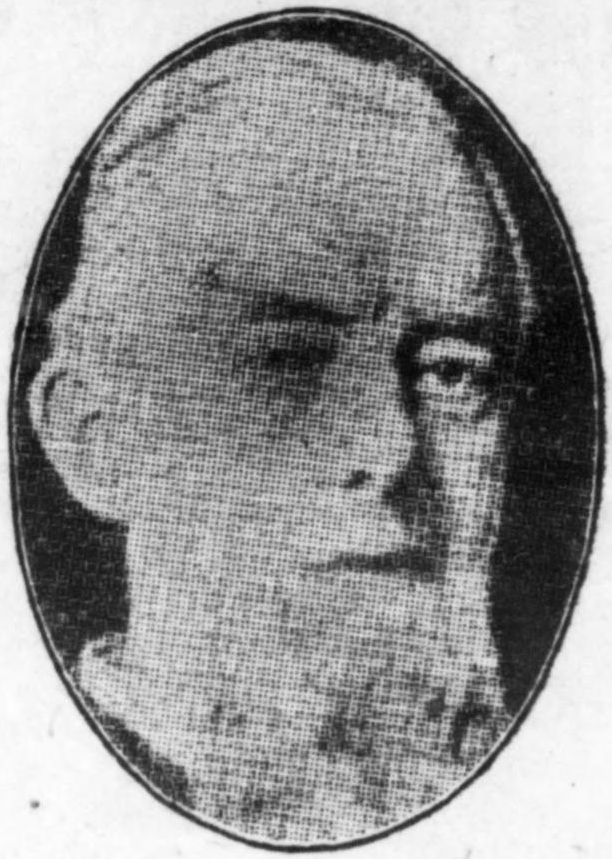
- Nominees (Wing and Matchett)

Convention
- Date(s): August 28, 1892
- City: New York City, New York

Candidates
- Presidential nominee: Simon Wing of Massachusetts
- Vice-presidential nominee: Charles H. Matchett of New York

1892 Socialist Labor National Convention saw the Socialist Labor Party of America nominate its first-ever presidential ticket (despite having a platform which called for the abolition of the presidency and vice presidency).

== Logistics ==
The Socialist Labor's inaugural presidential nominating convention was held in New York City on August 28, 1892. The convention only featured 8 delegates, and saw the nomination of a presidential election ticket and adoption of a party platform.

== Nominations ==
Despite the party platform advocating for the abolition of the offices of president and vice president, the party nominated candidates for both offices: Simon Wing and Charles H. Matchett, respectively.

This was the first election in which the party had nominated a presidential ticket.

== Aftermath ==
The Socialist Labor Party ticket appeared on ballots in six states, garnering a presidential popular vote of more than 21,000.
