= William Knudsen =

William Knudsen may refer to:

- William S. Knudsen, Danish-American automotive industry executive and U.S. Army general
- William Ross Knudsen, American socialist political activist and trade union organizer
