= Radnička Borba =

Serbo-Croatian-language socialist newspaper in the United States

- Type: Weekly newspaper
- Founded: 1907
- Political alignment: Socialist Labor Party of America
- Language: Serbo-Croatian
- Ceased publication: 1970
- Headquarters: New York City, Cleveland; Detroit
- Circulation: 3,000 (1923)

Radnička Borba (Worker's Struggle) was a Serbo-Croatian language socialist newspaper which was published from 1907 to 1970. The newspaper was initially published in New York City and served as an organ of the Yugoslav Federation of the Socialist Labor Party of America. Radnička Borba was staffed entirely by volunteers and frequently supported the interests of striking workers in the United States. The newspaper relocated to Detroit after World War II and ceased publication in 1970. In 1923 the paper had a weekly circulation of 3,000. Copies of Radnička Borba have been digitized and are part of the collection of the Library of Congress.
