= Arnold Petersen =

National Secretary of the Socialist Labor Party of America from 1914 to 1969

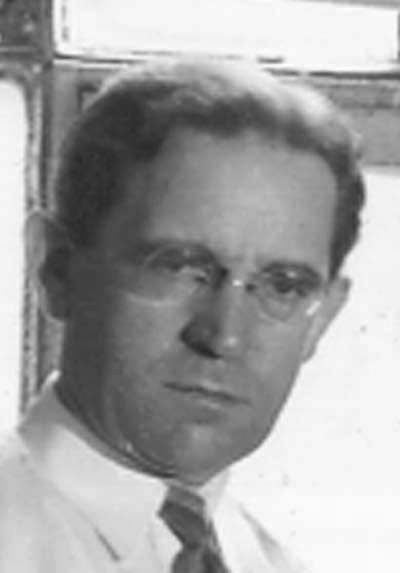

National Secretary of the Socialist Labor Party
- In office February 1, 1914 – 1969
- Preceded by: Paul Augustine
- Succeeded by: Nathan Karp

Personal details
- Born: April 16, 1885 Odense, Denmark
- Died: February 5, 1976 (aged 90) Paterson, New Jersey, United States
- Party: Socialist Labor (since 1907)
- Children: 1

Arnold Petersen (April 16, 1885 – February 5, 1976) was the National Secretary of the Socialist Labor Party of America from 1914 to 1969. Petersen played a major role as spokesman for that party and as a promoter of the De Leonist version of Marxist theory in the 20th century.

== Biography ==
Arnold Petersen was born in Odense, Denmark, the son of a tailor. After graduating college, he immigrated to the United States and worked in a paper box factory. In 1907, he joined the Socialist Labor Party.

Daniel De Leon nominated Petersen to be national secretary a few months before his death in May 1914. As national secretary, Petersen restructured the party and saved it from bankruptcy. He was also a prolific author, writing over fifty books, including a series of biographical monographs on De Leon, collected as Daniel De Leon: Social Architect.

When he retired as Socialist Labor Party of America leader in 1969, he had been the organization's leader for fifty-five of the organization's ninety-four years of existence, and seventy-nine years as a "De Leonist" organization (which the party dates from 1890).

A longtime resident of Teaneck, New Jersey, he died on February 5, 1976, in Paterson, New Jersey.

== Selected works ==
- Unemployment and overproduction (1930)
- The virus of anarchy: Bakuninism vs. Marxism (1932)
- Manifesto on War. Decay and corruption of international capitalism (1937)
- Constitution of the United States : Founding of the Bourgeois Republic New York : New York Labor News Company, 1937
- Daniel De Leon: From Reform to Revolution 1886–1936 New York: New York Labor News Co., 1937
- De Leon the uncompromising New York: New York Labor News Co., 1939
- Daniel De Leon: social architect (1941)
- From reform to bayonets (1941)
- Inflation of Prices or Deflation of Labor? (1942)
- Karl Marx and Marxian science (1943)
- Daniel de Leon: Internationalist New York: New York Labor News Co., 1944
- Daniel De Leon: Social scientist (1945)
- Marxism vs. Soviet despotism (1959)
- Socialism and human nature (1962)
- Bourgeois Socialism: Its Rise and Collapse in America (1963)

== Sources ==
- Biographical Dictionary of the American Left (Bernard K. Johnpoll and Harvey Klehr editors ( "Arnold Petersen" by John Gerber, pp. 314–5. Westport, CN: Greenwood Press. 1986

== Other sources ==
- Girard, Frank and Ben Perry, Socialist Labor Party, 1876–1991: A Short History (Philadelphia, PA: Livra Books, 1991)
- Hass, Eric The Socialist Labor Party and the Internationals (New York Labor News Co. 1949)
- Quint, Howard The Forging of American Socialism: Origins of the Modern Movement: The Impact of Socialism on American Thought and Action, 1886–1901 (Columbia, SC: University of South Carolina Press, 1953)
