= William Ross Knudsen =

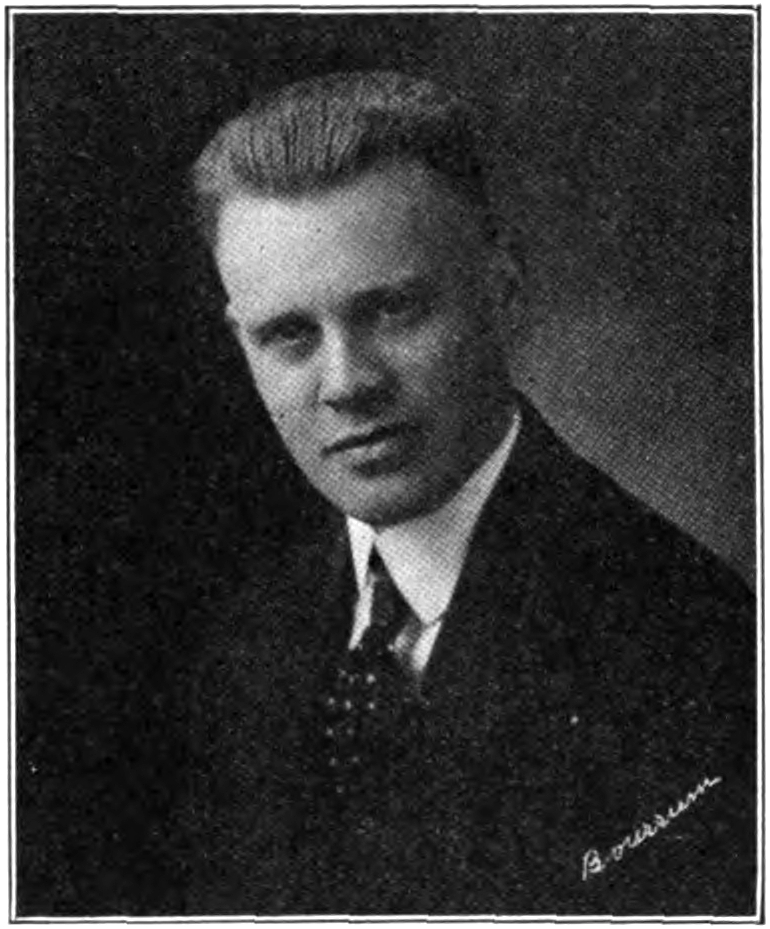
- Knudsen c. 1922
- Born: September 30, 1892; Petaluma, California, U.S.
- Died: 1977 (aged 84–85)
- Education: University of California
- Political party: Socialist Labor

William Ross Knudsen (September 30, 1892 – 1977) was an American socialist political activist and trade union organizer. Knudsen was an organizer for the International Association of Machinists and the leader of two major strikes conducted by that organization. He was also the Socialist Labor Party candidate in the 1923 San Francisco mayoral election.

== Biography ==
=== Early years ===
Knudsen was born in Petaluma, California to ethnic German immigrant parents: his father was a chicken rancher. He attended school in San Jose, California, before enrolling in the University of California, from which he received a Bachelor of Arts degree in 1914.

=== Socialist ===
Knudsen recounted the story behind his radicalization in a magazine article published in the monthly magazine of the Trade Union Educational League in 1922. In the autobiographical article published there, Knudsen declared his political activity dated to his inadvertent embroilment in a free speech demonstration, when he was swept up and arrested although merely a passerby. Knudsen wrote:

"There was a free speech fight on, but of it I knew nothing. Suddenly a policeman’s hand shook my shoulder, and when, insulted, I resisted, I was slammed in the jaw; completely subdued, I was brought before the police sergeant, absolutely in the dark as to what was the cause.

'Here’s another Red, Sergeant.'"

Upon his discharge by the police Knudsen recalled, "Once outside I began to puzzle my mind. Socialism? Unionism? Red neckties? And while still trying to [connect] them together, I suddenly came upon a radical hall. In I went and was soon buying all the pamphlets and literature in sight." Knudsen concluded that it was "the brutal actions of the police, the confinement with these rebels and my mental reactions to all this" which caused him to investigate the radical movement further, reading extensively on the topic. "Reading and thinking produced the result a red," Knudsen recalled.

Knudsen would join the Socialist Labor Party of America in 1915.

=== Activism and career ===
Knudsen was a delegate of the San Francisco Iron trade council from 1913 to 1918 and from 1923 to 1925.

Knudsen became president of the San Jose Central Labor Council in 1918 through 1919. In 1918 Knudsen was active during a forty-four-hour protest with machinists from San Francisco when he was a delegate of the San Francisco Iron Trade Council. During 1919 Knudsen became an Organizer for the International Association of Machinists (IAM). The next year he would lead 3000 machinists in a strike and held another strike consisting of 10,000 Machinists in 7-month strike in Cincinnati in 1920.

During 1921–1922 Knudsen toured the Soviet Union. While there he became a delegate to the Red International of Labor Unions and participated in CI congresses. Knudsen was granted the honor of delivering an address to graduating officers of the red army during the 5th anniversary of the Russian Revolution on November 6, 1922.

Returning to America, Knudsen sought to be the international president of the IAM, although he was defeated in this effort. He did become an organizer for the IAM in San Francisco, however.

Knudsen was a candidate for the Socialist Labor Party in San Francisco running for Mayor during 1923. Despite his pro-Communist proclivities, Knudsen reaffirmed his allegiance to the Socialist Labor Party in this campaign, declaring it "the only bona fide party representing the workers' interests." With no realistic chance of winning, Knudsen made an appeal for the SLP's maximum demands to voters, calling for "the working class to back up their ballot by organizing into industrial unions" and to use these to "take and hold the means of production," to be governed through a "Congress of Labor."

In 1924 Knudsen became a presidential elector of California for the Socialist Labor Party. Another accolade for Knudsen during 1924 was becoming a lecturer for the San Francisco Labor College and also was a lecturer for classes specializing in Socialist Labor politics classes.

During the course of his political activities Knudsen authored articles on economics, the organized labor movement, psychology, science, and history.
