= 1892 United States presidential election in Maine =

- November 8, 1892
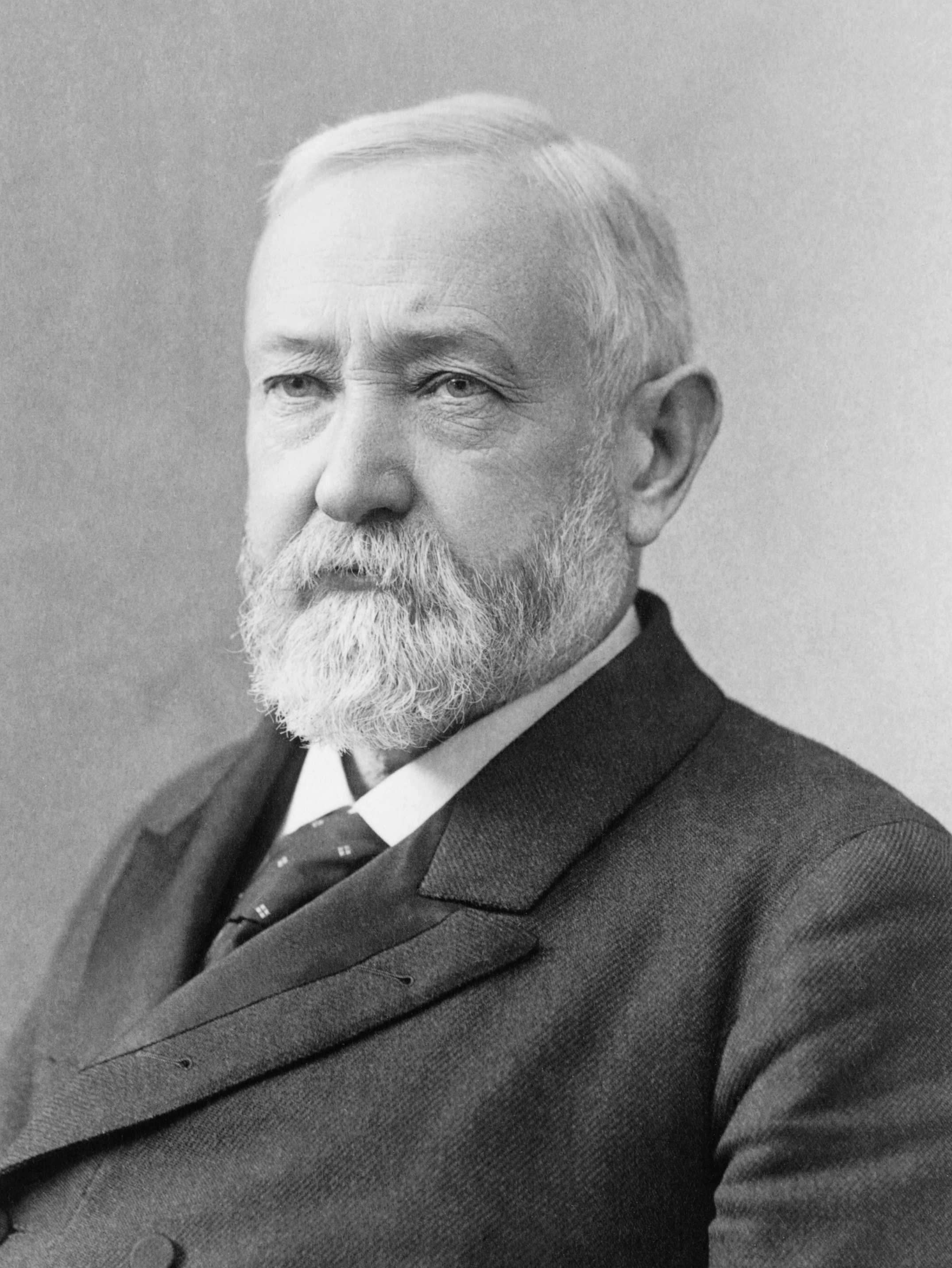

Nominee	Benjamin Harrison	Grover Cleveland
Party	Republican	Democratic
Home state	Indiana	New York
Running mate	Whitelaw Reid	Adlai Stevenson I
Electoral vote	6	0
Popular vote	62,936	48,049
Percentage	54.05%	41.26%
County results
Harrison
40–50%
50–60%
60–70%
President before election
Benjamin Harrison
Republican
Elected President
Grover Cleveland
Democratic

The 1892 United States presidential election in Maine took place on November 8, 1892, as part of the 1892 United States presidential election. Voters chose six representatives, or electors to the Electoral College, who voted for president and vice president.

Maine voted for the Republican nominee, incumbent president Benjamin Harrison, over the Democratic nominee, former president Grover Cleveland, who was running for a second, non-consecutive term. Harrison won the state by a margin of 12.79%.

With 54.05% of the popular vote, Maine would prove to be Harrison's second strongest victory in terms of percentage of the popular vote after Vermont.

== Results ==
1892 United States presidential election in Maine
Party	Candidate	Running mate	Popular vote		Electoral vote	
Party	Candidate	Running mate	Count	%	Count	%
Republican	Benjamin Harrison of Indiana	Whitelaw Reid of New York	62,936	54.05%	6	100.00%
Democratic	Grover Cleveland of New York (incumbent)	Adlai Ewing Stevenson I of Illinois	48,049	41.26%	0	0.00%
Prohibition	John Bidwell of California	James Britton Cranfill of Texas	3,066	2.63%	0	0.00%
Populist	James Baird Weaver of Iowa	James Gaven Field of Virginia	2,396	2.05%	0	0.00%
N/A	Others	Others	4	0.01%	0	0.00%
Total			116,451	100.00%	6	100.00%

=== Results by county ===
County	Benjamin Harrison Republican		Stephen Grover Cleveland Democratic		John Bidwell Prohibition		James Baird Weaver People's		Margin		Total votes cast
County	#	%	#	%	#	%	#	%	#	%	Total votes cast
Androscoggin	4,326	52.47%	3,452	41.87%	200	2.43%	266	3.23%	874	10.60%	8,244
Aroostook	2,893	54.18%	1,917	35.90%	505	9.46%	25	0.47%	976	18.28%	5,340
Cumberland	9,165	51.85%	8,050	45.54%	370	2.09%	92	0.52%	1,115	6.31%	17,677
Franklin	1,964	55.50%	1,456	41.14%	83	2.35%	36	1.02%	508	14.35%	3,539
Hancock	3,330	53.65%	2,654	42.76%	81	1.30%	142	2.29%	676	10.89%	6,207
Kennebec	6,165	57.27%	4,094	38.03%	289	2.68%	217	2.02%	2,071	19.24%	10,765
Knox	2,321	46.23%	2,136	42.54%	92	1.83%	472	9.40%	185	3.68%	5,021
Lincoln	2,018	53.44%	1,585	41.98%	101	2.67%	72	1.91%	433	11.47%	3,776
Oxford	3,520	56.12%	2,491	39.72%	149	2.38%	112	1.79%	1,029	16.41%	6,272
Penobscot	6,571	55.78%	4,516	38.33%	358	3.04%	336	2.85%	2,055	17.44%	11,781
Piscataquis	1,909	58.02%	1,249	37.96%	96	2.92%	36	1.09%	660	20.06%	3,290
Sagadahoc	2,265	61.27%	1,278	34.57%	96	2.60%	58	1.57%	987	26.70%	3,697
Somerset	3,777	54.60%	2,872	41.51%	152	2.20%	117	1.69%	905	13.08%	6,918
Waldo	2,503	50.89%	2,151	43.74%	55	1.12%	209	4.25%	352	7.16%	4,918
Washington	3,817	54.79%	2,906	41.71%	174	2.50%	70	1.00%	911	13.08%	6,967
York	6,387	53.20%	5,237	43.62%	261	2.17%	121	1.01%	1,150	9.58%	12,006
Totals	62,931	54.06%	48,044	41.27%	3,062	2.63%	2,381	2.05%	14,887	12.79%	116,418

== See also ==
- United States presidential elections in Maine
