= Charles H. Matchett =

American politician

Charles H. Matchett (1843–1919)

Charles Horatio Matchett (May 15, 1843 – October 24, 1919) was an American socialist politician. He is best remembered as the first candidate of the Socialist Labor Party of America for Vice President of the United States in the election of 1892 and as the party's candidate for President of the United States in the election of 1896.

== Biography ==
=== Early years ===
Matchett was born May 15, 1843, hailing originally from the Brighton-Allston area of Massachusetts. He was the descendant of New Englanders dating their presence in America to the 1630s.

At the age of 16, Matchett went to sea and circumnavigated Cape Horn aboard a windjammer. He worked at various times in his earlier years as a United States Navy sailor, a clerk, carpenter, and beer bottler.

In the middle 1880s, Matchett moved to Brooklyn, New York, where he worked as an electrician.

=== Political career ===
Matchett served as a charter member of the Brooklyn Nationalist Club and was active in the campaign to elect Henry George as Mayor of New York.

In 1890, Matchett was the organizer of American Branch No. 1 of Section New York of the Socialist Labor Party of America (SLP). Matchett was influential in bringing many of the New York Nationalists into the ranks of the party.

In 1892, Machett ran on a ticket headed by Massachusetts camera manufacturer Simon Wing as the vice presidential nominee of the SLP. It was the first time that the party ran a national ticket. Wing and Machett appeared on the ballot in six states and received a total of 21,512 votes. Of this total, New York City alone provided 6,100 votes. The platform of the party in 1892 committed to abolishing the offices of president and vice president as soon as they came to power. According to one historian of the election, most of the SLP ticket's support in 1892 came not from labor, but from the "Bellamyites", middle-class intellectuals and reformers.

In the New York election of 1894, Matchett ran for Governor on the Socialist Labor Party ticket.

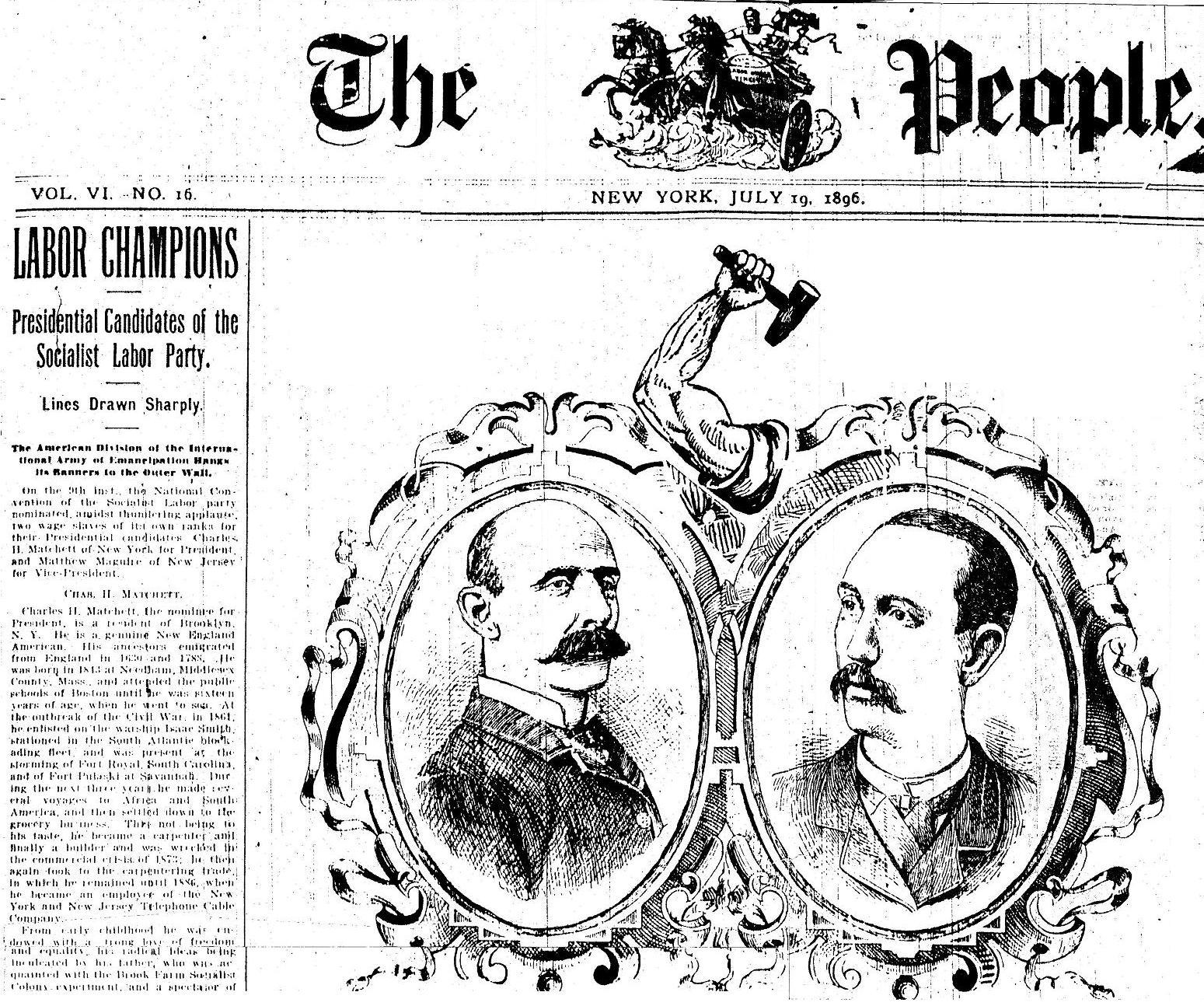
Charles H. Matchett and Matthew Maguire, The People, July 19, 1896

In 1896, Matchett headed the Socialist Labor Party ticket as its candidate for President of the United States. About one half of the 36,359 votes received by Matchett and his running mate Matthew Maguire of New Jersey, came from New York state. When Matchett ran in 1896 he was the foreman for the telephone company in New York making $18 per week. The SLP's platform in 1896 called for government assumption of all means of production and distribution.

Matchett left the Socialist Labor Party during the organization's bitter 1899 split and joined the organization headed by Henry Slobodin and Morris Hillquit which merged with the Chicago-based Social Democratic Party of America in the summer of 1901 to form the Socialist Party of America (SPA).

In 1903, Matchett ran for the New York Court of Appeals on the ticket of the SPA, receiving 33,339 votes. He was also a candidate for New York State Assembly and New York City Council at various times.

Matchett was a pioneer in the United States of the international language Esperanto and a delegate to the first Universal Congress of Esperantists in 1905. There he was elected as an officer of the congress, representing the United States. The same year, the Boston Esperanto Club was founded in Matchett's home town, the first in the US.

=== Death and legacy ===
Charles Matchett died October 24, 1919, in Allston, Massachusetts, after a long illness. He was 76 years old at the time of his death.
