= Simon Wing =

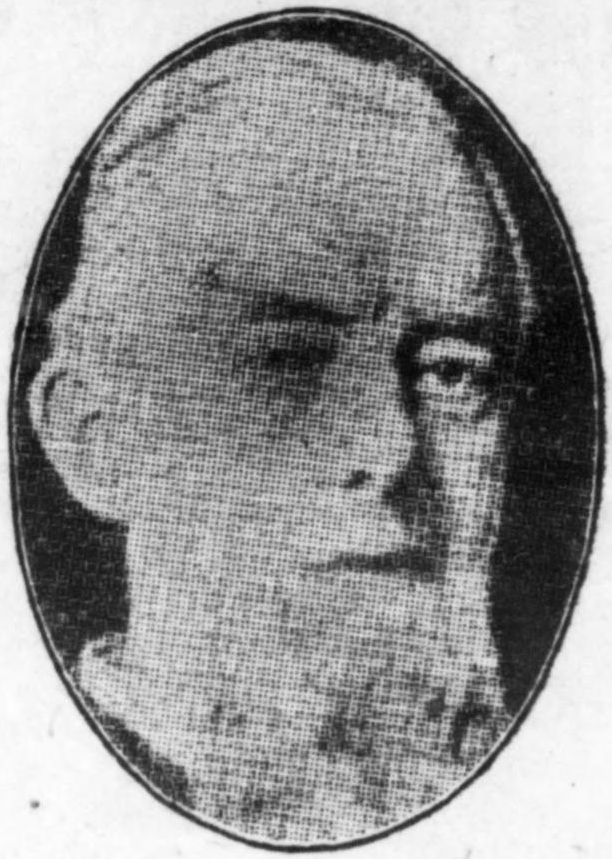
Simon Wing

Simon Wing (August 29, 1826 – December 17, 1910) was an American daguerreotypist, camera inventor and socialist politician. He is best remembered as the first candidate of the Socialist Labor Party of America for President of the United States, running for that office in 1892.

== Biography ==
Wing later in life

Simon Wing was born in Saint Albans, Maine on August 29, 1826. As a photographer and ferrotypist, he kept a studio on Washington Street in Boston. Wing spent most of his life living in the town of Watertown, Massachusetts.

=== Political career ===
Wing was an active member of the Socialist Labor Party of America (SLP) and stood as its first nominee for President of the United States in 1892, heading a ticket with Brooklyn, New York electrician Charles H. Matchett. The SLP ran tickets in six states in that year, garnering a total vote of 21,512.

=== Death ===
Simon Wing died December 17, 1910 at his home in Charlestown, Massachusetts. He was 84 years old at the time of his death.

== Images ==
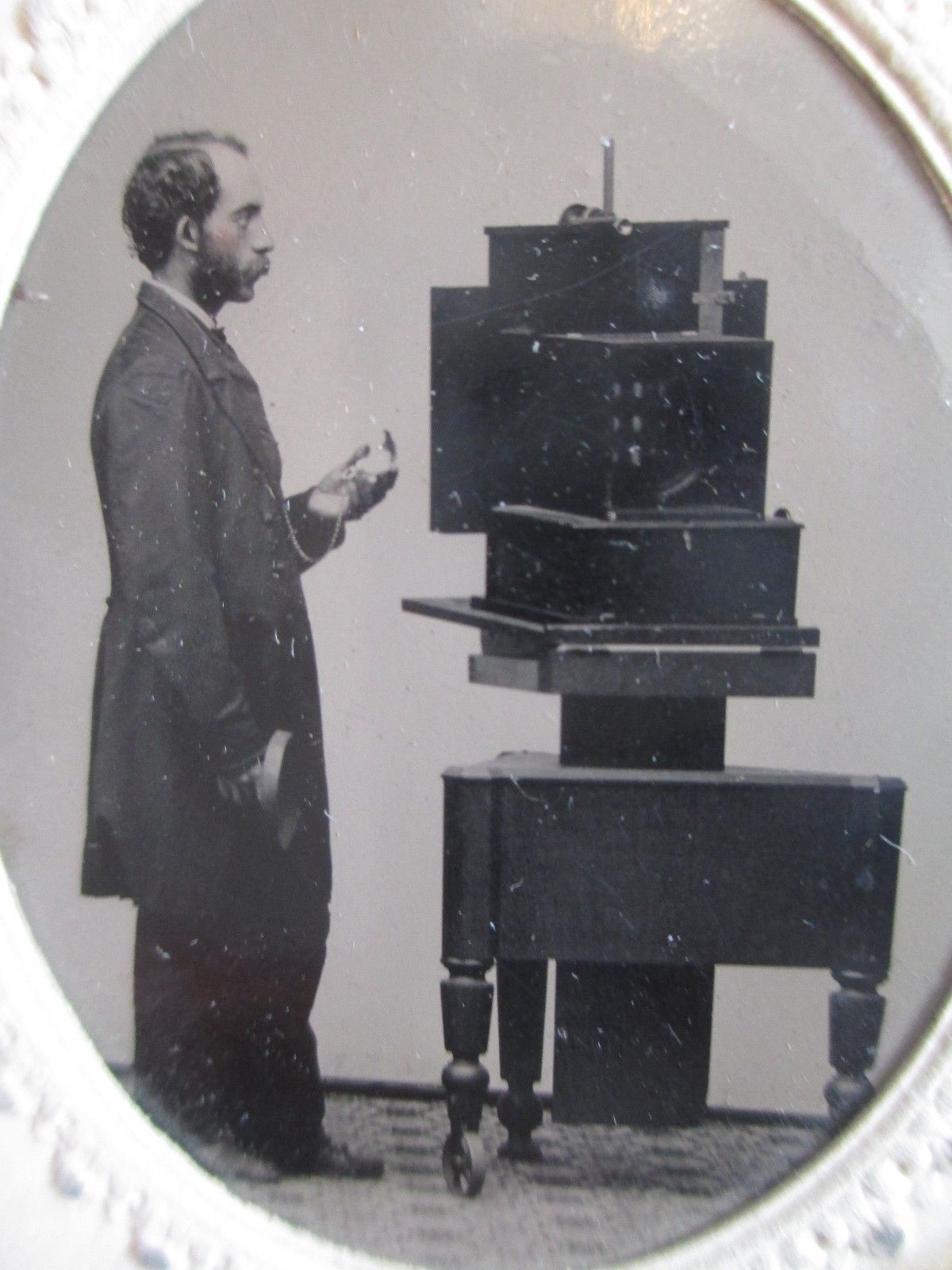
Photographer with a Simon Wing camera c. 1860

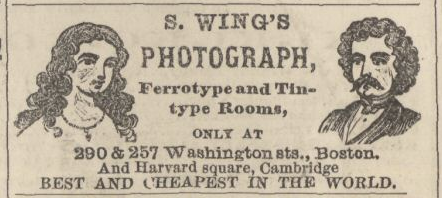
S. Wing's Photograph, Ferrotype and Tin-type Rooms, 1869

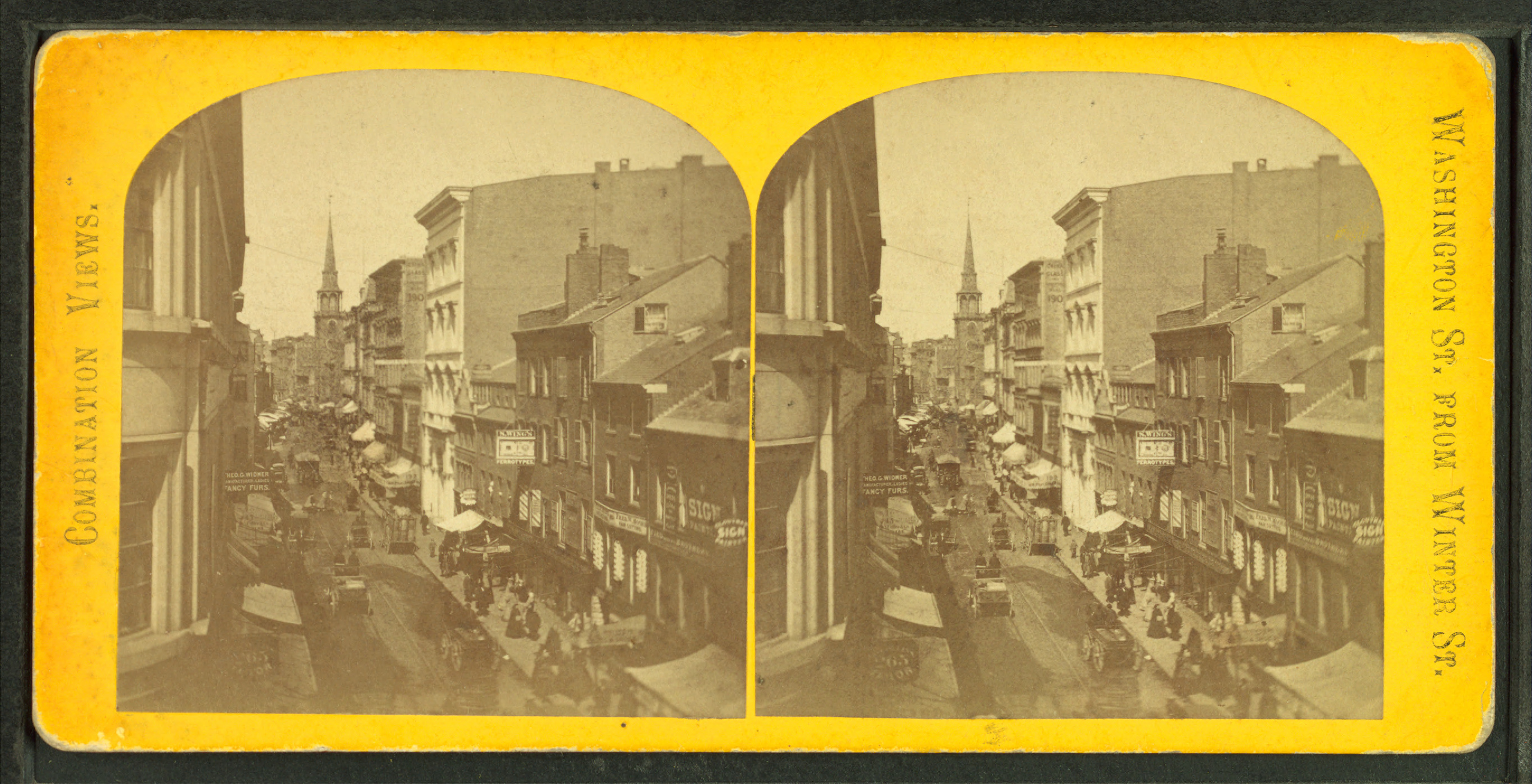
Washington Street in Boston, with "S. Wing's Ferrotype" sign, 1872

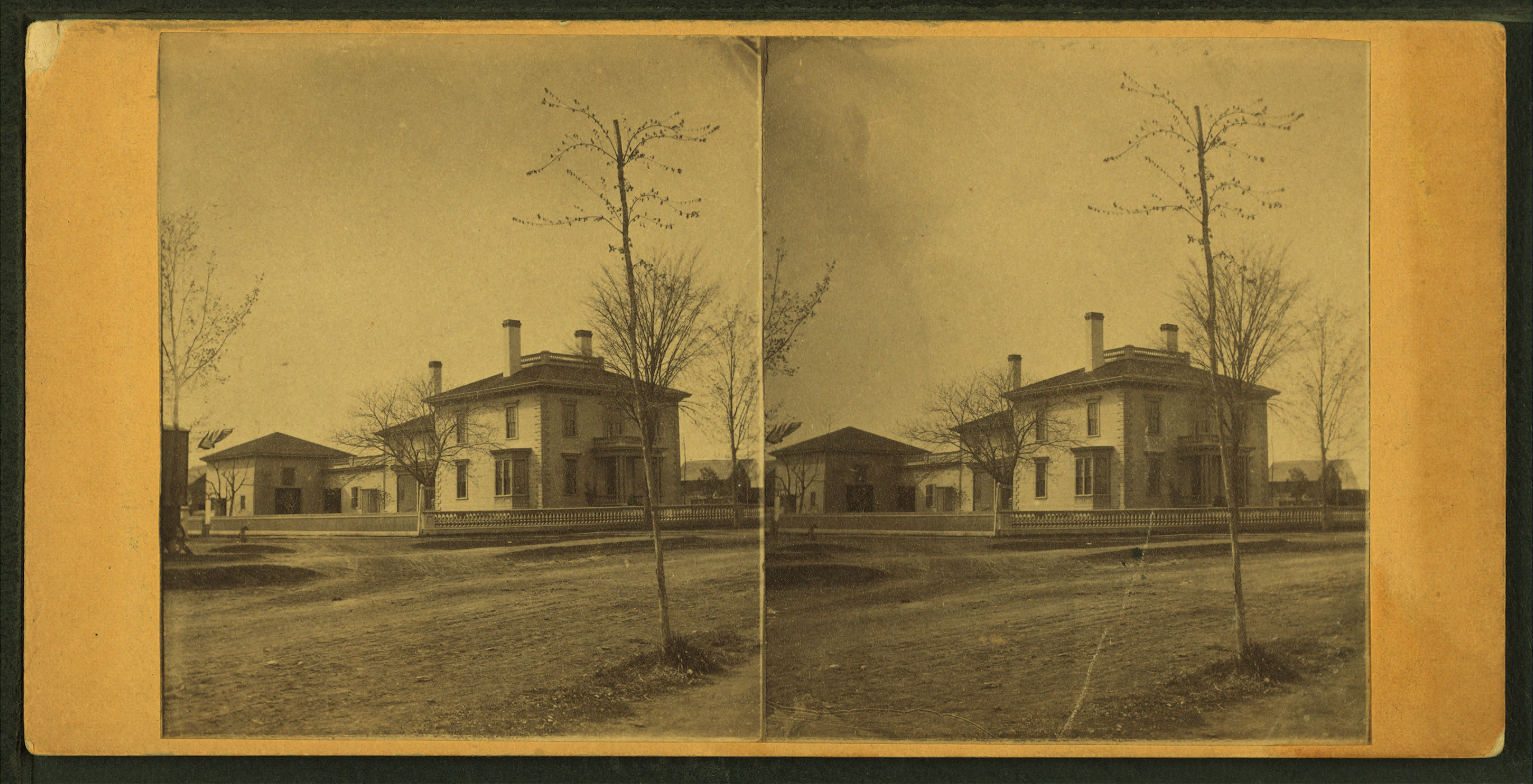
Photograph of Watertown, Massachusetts by Wing c. 1868–1881
