= Hans Staudinger =

German politician and economist

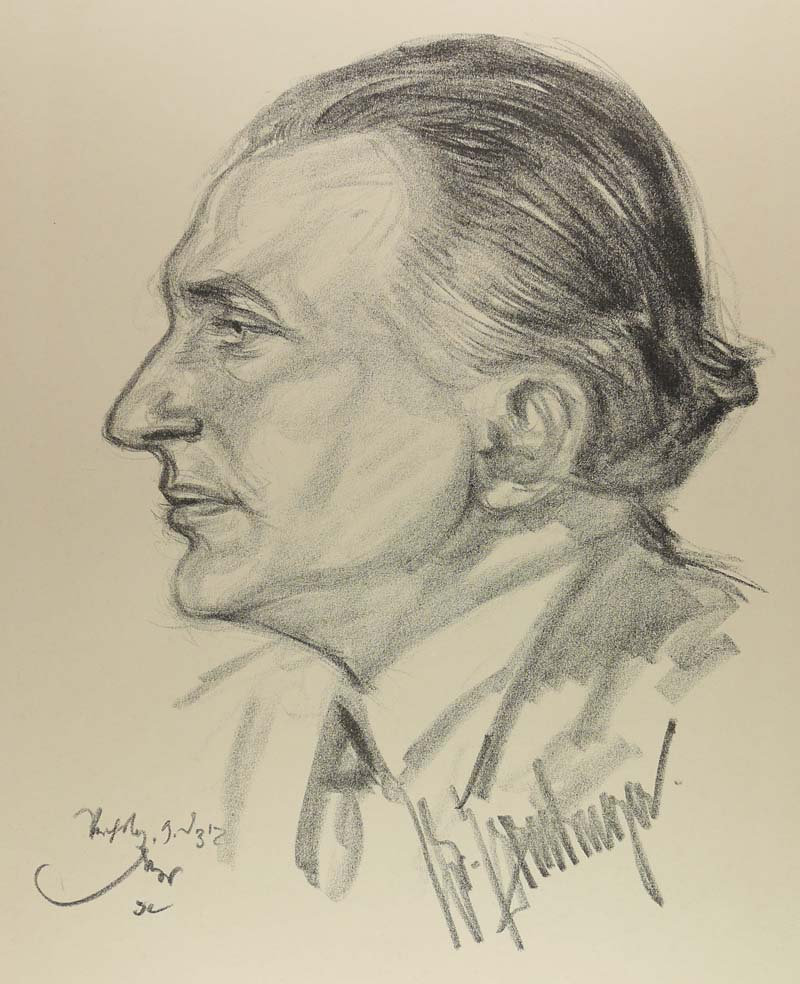
Hans Staudinger

Hans Staudinger (born 16 August 1889 in Worms, Germany; died 25 February 1980 in New York City, NY) was a politician of the Social Democratic Party of Germany (SPD) and an economist, as well as a state secretary in the Prussian trade ministry from 1929 to 1932. From November 1932 to June 1933 he was a Social Democrat member of the Reichstag.

== Youth ==
Staudinger was born to the gymnasium (high school) teacher Franz Staudinger and his wife Auguste Staudinger, née Wenck, and was baptised as a Protestant. He had two brothers and one sister. His father was a leading theorist of the cooperative movement and was connected to prominent Social Democrats such as August Bebel and Eduard Bernstein. His friendship with the latter lasted his whole life.

Hans Staudinger acquired his Abitur at the Ludwig-Georgs-Gymnasium in Darmstadt. He started an apprenticeship as a carpenter while still at school, but did not pursue this. He also temporarily worked as an engine stoker. The incentive for this came from his father, who wanted his son to have insight into the world of the working classes. His brother Hermann Staudinger, who received the 1953 Nobel Prize for Chemistry, followed a similar path at the request of his father.

== Studies and World War I ==
From 1907 to 1908, Staudinger studied at literature and German philology at the Ludwig-Maximilians-Universität München. In 1908 he transferred to the Ruprecht-Karls-Universität Heidelberg. Here he studied economics and sociology. His most significant university teachers were the brothers Alfred and Max Weber. In 1913 he received his Dr. phil. for a thesis on entitled Individuum und Gemeinschaft in der Kulturorganisation des Vereins (The Individual and the Community in the Cultural Organisation of the Society), being supervised by Alfred Weber. In this thesis, Staudinger investigated the change in musical societies from the Middle Ages to the middle-class community choirs of his time. The underlying claim was that the alienation of the individual would in the near future be overcome by the community life of the workers. What Staudinger saw as the natural form of community life in the Middle Ages would thus be renewed.

In his first semester as a student, Staudinger joined the SPD. Until 1914 he also took on a leading role in the Südwestdeutscher Wandervogelbund, and was the leader of a Wandervogelgruppe. From 1913 to 1914 he was the secretary of the Revisionsverband Südwestdeutscher Konsumvereine. He served as an officer in World War I, and received the Iron Cross Second Class in 1916. In the last year of the war Staudinger was severely wounded and lost his sight in one eye.

== Administrative career ==
After his recovery, in Spring 1918 he was made a head of division in the Kriegsernährungsamt (War Office of Food, based in Berlin), where he remained until July 1919. He then moved to the Ministry of Economics, where he stayed until 1927. From 1920 he was a Vortragender Rat (Expert Councillor). With some economy ministers, he served as their personal advisor. In addition, he functioned as the liaison with the Reichswirtschaftsrat (Economy Council). In the 1920s Staudinger aspired to drive forward the cartelisation of the extractive and energy industries under state control. This policy would make possible a form of social economy, which was supported in the ministry by Rudolf Wissell (SPD) and Wichard von Moellendorff. However, hardly any state direction of these industries came about. The only result of Staudinger's efforts was the publication of a comprehensive study of structural problems of the German economy after the First World War, which was presented by a corresponding committee of inquiry, as proposed by Staudinger in 1925.

In 1927 Staudinger became a civil servant in the Prussian trade ministry. There he was responsible for port, transport and electricity industries, from 1929 as a state secretary. The political situation in the democratic Prussia under Otto Braun and the tradition of state-directed economy in this state offered better chances for social economic plans to be realized. The Preußenschlag of the German government under Franz von Papen in 1932 put an end to Staudinger's government career; he was put on leave whilst his salary continued to be paid.

In the government bureaucracy, Staudinger was known since the end of the 1920s as a leading specialist in matters of social economy, and is seen by historians as one of the few distinguished senior civil servants with republican sympathies. In 1932 he published a text in which he presented his thoughts on the economy to a wider audience. This underlined his reputation as an expert on public enterprise.

Staudinger held posts in the boards of directors of various state-run businesses. He was for example chairman of the board of the company Preussag, the creation of which he had instigated, and held the same position at VEBA, which he had also worked towards creating. He was deputy chairman of the boards of the Aktiengesellschaft für deutsche Elektrizitätswirtschaft in Berlin and Obere Saale AG in Weimar. He was a member of the board of Elektrowerke AG in Berlin, Duisburg-Ruhrorter Hafen AG, the Thüringische Gasgesellschaft, and the Hamburgisch-Preußischen Hafengemeinschaft GmbH. He also taught at the Deutsche Hochschule für Politik.

After the Preußenschlag, Staudinger intensified his contacts with the Social Democrats Carlo Mierendorff and Theodor Haubach, who were determined to answer the increasing political violence in the early 1930s with strong social-democratic fighting units for the defence of the Republic. In this context Staudinger was invited by Hamburg Social Democrats around Hans Carl Podeyn and Karl Meitmann to succeed Peter Graßmann in the Hamburg Reichstag constituency as candidate for the elections in November 1932. After initially hesitating, Staudinger agreed, and won the seat for the SPD. He was not able to exert any great influence in the Reichstag, however, as the National Socialists came to power on 30 January 1933. In the following weeks, Staudinger worked hard to organise the Social-Democratic resistance, particularly in Hamburg. In Berlin, he got Fritz Naphtali and Fritz Tarnow released from Gestapo arrest. He did this by impersonating a senior Prussian official, and ordering their release. Hermann Göring tried to persuade him to take a coordinating role of the integrated economy in the Third Reich, but Staudinger rejected this.

On 16 June 1933 Staudinger was arrested in Hamburg, along with leading Social Democrats of the city. He remained in "protective custody" until 22 July 1933. Then he fled to Belgium, where he remained until September 1933. Danny Heinemann, the head of the Belgian energy group Sofina, employed him as an adviser. Staudinger's reasons for fleeing Germany were his opposition to National Socialism, his experience of being arrested and his concern for his Jewish wife. After he was forced to return to Germany, he finally emigrated to the United States via Belgium, France and Britain. At the same time, he was offered a post in Ankara advising the Turkish government on matters of economic policy; this he rejected, however.

== New School for Social Research ==
In spring 1934, he was made a professor of economics at the New School for Social Research in New York City. Many emigrants who were either friends or acquaintances of his also worked at this institution, such as Eduard Heimann, Arnold Brecht and Emil Lederer. He received American citizenship in 1940.

Staudinger's political and writing experiences in the field of the social economy found an interested specialist audience in the United States. President Roosevelt was trying to overcome the effects of the Great Depression with his New Deal policy. Some of the largest projects were for example the creation of an authority for energy production and regional development, the Tennessee Valley Authority, which was to develop the use of the water power of the Tennessee River as well as the development of the extensive Tennessee Valley. Staudinger was able to show in his publications what kind of employment stimulus could be expected from large electrification programmes, the new room for manoeuvre the government could gain against regional electricity monopolies by setting up public energy suppliers, and what social effects electrification would have on rural areas that had hitherto been overlooked by the electricity suppliers for reasons of costs.

In his new academic post, however, his time was spent less on research and publications than on academic administration and teaching. Over several years he influenced the work of the Graduate Faculty of Political und Social Science as its dean, by turning the "University in Exile" into an American academic institution. He became dean in 1939 after the death of economist and sociologist Emil Lederer. Staudinger's wife Else, whom he had married in 1912, had taken her Ph.D. under Lederer's supervision, being the first woman to do so in Heidelberg. Staudinger also worked as dean from 1941 to 1943, from 1950 to 1951 and from 1953 to 1959. He was also active in fundraising, as his faculty was one that frequently suffered under a lack of resources.

Hans and Else Staudinger founded a committee to support persecuted scientists and intellectuals, the American Council for Émigrés in the Professions, in the New School for Social Research. In this they co-operated with the prominent religious socialist Paul Tillich and Eleanor Roosevelt, wife of the US President. Until the end of the 1950s, the Council helped more than 3,000 refugees to find jobs.

In the United States, Staudinger was in close contact with exiled Social Democrats from Germany, many of whom he had known personally before he emigrated. He belonged to the founders of the German Labour Delegation who included Max Brauer, formerly the mayor of the Prussian town of Altona, his friend Rudolf Katz and the former Prussian Minister of the Interior Albert Grzesinski. In the second half of World War II he turned away from this group however, when they started vehemently arguing against plans for an Allied occupation of Germany, under the influence of Friedrich Stampfer, a member of the SPD leadership. In 1943 Staudinger, Tillich, Paul Hertz and Carl Zuckmayer formed the core of the Council for a Democratic Germany that was officially founded in 1944.

In January 1947 Staudinger was amongst the signatories of a declaration by former Social Democratic Reichstag members that was printed in Time and in the Neue Volkszeitung, the leading German-language newspaper in the United States. This declaration argued against mass expulsions, dismantlement of German industry and an occupation of Germany, and demanded a peace treaty, with reference to the Atlantic Charter.

After the Second World War, Staudinger became an important link between the United States and Germany in the academic world. On his initiative, on the occasion of Theodor Heuss' visit to the United States in the early 1960s, the Theodor Heuss Chair was created at the New School for Social Research. This was to give young social scientists the opportunity to teach in New York for one year. After 1959, Staudinger worked as editor of the political science journal Social Research.

After his retirement, along with his wife Else Staudinger he donated the endowment for a professorial chair at the New School for Social Research in 1965. After Else died, he married Elisabeth Todd in 1967.

== Honours ==
In 1959 Theodor Heuss awarded honours to German emigrants in New York on the occasion of his 75th birthday. In this context Hans Staudinger received the Großes Verdienstkreuz (Great Cross of Merit), as did his wife Else and Hans Simons and Arnold Brecht, two of his colleagues at the New School. On 16 August 1969 the Federal Republic of Germany honoured him again, this time with the Großes Verdienstkreuz mit Stern (Great Cross of Merit with star). This award of an even higher honour was justified by Staudinger's continuing achievements in furthering American understanding of Germany.

The Großkrotzenburg Staudinger Power Station is also named after him.
