= GLD =

GLD may refer to:

== Organisations ==
- German Labour Delegation, an American exile organization
- Government Legal Department of the United Kingdom
- Government Logistics Department of Hong Kong
- People's Liberation Army General Logistics Department, China

== Other ==
- Global Lexicostatistical Database, a linguistics database
- Global Love Day, mainly in the United States
- Goodland Municipal Airport, in Kansas, United States
- Guildford railway station in England
- Nanai language, spoken in Russia and China (ISO 639 code gld)
- SPDR Gold Shares, an exchange-traded fund
- General Learning Disability, a neurodevelopmental disorder
