= William Rosenberg (disambiguation) =

William Rosenberg (1916–2002) was an American entrepreneur who founded Dunkin' Donuts.

William Rosenberg may also refer to:

- Wilhelm Rosenberg (1850–1930s), known as William, German-American teacher, poet, playwright, journalist, and socialist political activist
- William Rosenberg (actor) (1920–2014), Danish actor
- S. William Rosenberg (1916–1990), American politician in New York
- William Frederick Henry Rosenberg (1868–1957), English naturalist and natural history dealer

== See also ==
- William of Rosenberg (1535–1592), Bohemian nobleman
