= Social Democracy of America =

Short-lived 1890s U.S. political party that established a community in Washington

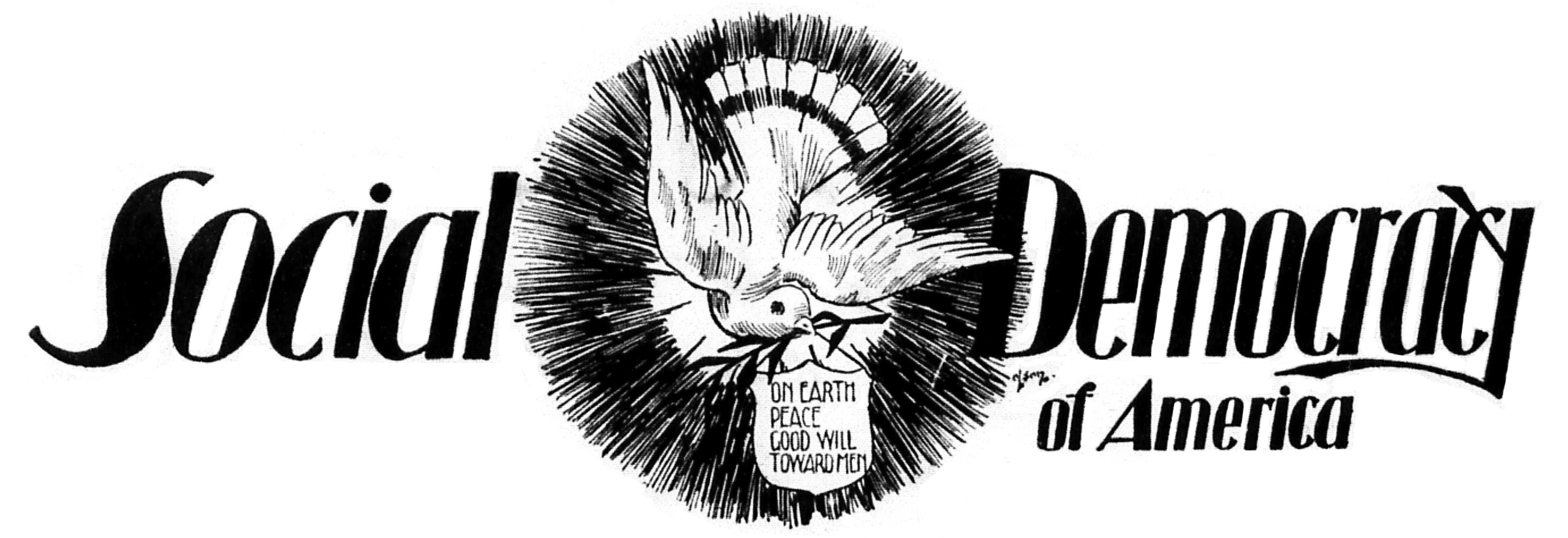
- Founded: June 15, 1897
- Dissolved: September 1898
- Preceded by: American Railway Union
- Succeeded by: Cooperative Brotherhood; Social Democratic Party of America
- Ideology: Democratic socialism Utopian socialism
- Political position: Left-wing

The Social Democracy of America (SDA), later known as the Cooperative Brotherhood, was a short lived political party in the United States that sought to combine the planting of an intentional community with political action in order to create a socialist society. It was an organizational forerunner of both the Socialist Party of America (SPA) and the Burley, Washington cooperative socialist colony.

The party split into political and colonization wings at its convention in 1898, with the political actionists establishing themselves as the Social Democratic Party of America (SDP).

== History ==
=== Formation ===
Eugene V. Debs addresses the founding convention of the Social Democracy of America in Chicago, June 15, 1897

After being jailed in the aftermath of the 1894 Pullman Strike, Eugene V. Debs became interested in socialist ideas. Despite supporting William Jennings Bryan in the 1896 presidential race, Debs announced his conversion to socialism in January 1897. In June of that year, he held a convention of his American Railway Union (ARU) in Chicago, where it was decided to merge the ARU with a faction of the Brotherhood of the Cooperative Commonwealth (BCC) and other elements to create a new organization, the Social Democracy of America. The newspaper of the ARU, Railway Times, was retitled The Social Democrat and became the official organ of the new organization. The convention establishing the SDA was opened on June 15, 1897, in Uhlich's Hall in Chicago—the former headquarters of the ARU during the Pullman strike. The session was attended by 118 delegates, predominately from the Midwest and the Western United States. The keynote address to the convention was delivered by Eugene Debs.

Among the elements that joined in forming the new party was a faction of independent Midwestern socialists centered around Victor Berger. This mainly German American group kept up a loosely organized Social Democratisher Verein and published the oldest socialist daily in the country, the Milwaukee Vorwarts. This tendency emphasized electoral socialism, especially in local politics, in order to appeal to workers on issues of immediate, day-to-day importance. Prominent American adherents to this faction included Seymour Stedman and Frederic Heath.

While the SDA was being organized, there was some factional trouble within the older Socialist Labor Party (SLP). Some elements within the SLP's Jewish membership, concentrated in Manhattan's Lower East Side, had objected to the party's dual unionism policy. As a consequence, the party's Yiddish language papers—the Dos Abend Blatt and Arbeter-Zeitung—were put under direct party control. When the dissidents responded by launching The Jewish Daily Forward and forming Press Clubs to influence party activity among Jewish members, the party leadership expelled the fourth, fifth and twelfth assembly district branches on July 4. The expelled branches held a convention July 31 to August 2, at which they decided to affiliate with the SDA. Among the prominent members of this faction were Abraham Cahan, Meyer London, Isaac Hourwich, Morris Winchevsky, Michael Zametkin, Max Pine and Louis E. Miller.

In St. Louis, the local SLP branch had published its own paper, Labor, in the early to mid-nineties. Edited by Albert Sanderson and Gustav Hoehn, the paper showed independence from the SLP leadership and also opposed the dual union policy. Its editorial policy was condemned, and the paper was disaffiliated from the party at the 1896 convention, but ill feeling toward the party leadership continued.

In January 1897, the St. Louis local readmitted a member named Priestbach into the party after he had left in 1896 to work for William Jennings Bryan's campaign. The vote for readmittance was 28 to 24 in Priesterbach's favor, which was less than the two- thirds majority prescribed by the SLP constitution. On petition of loyal members, the St. Louis local was reorganized and the dissident members went into the new SDA. This contingent was bolstered in August 1897 when the SDA was joined by the remnants of the Social Democratic Federation (SDF), a predominantly German-language group headed by Wilhelm Rosenberg which had split from the SLP in 1889.

From the very beginning, there were divisions in the group between those who saw its main purpose as winning office and introducing socialistic legislation, and those influenced by the BCC idea of trying to "socialize" a Western state by planting socialist colonies there and eventually taking over its government. Nevertheless, a three-man colonization commission crisscrossed the country visiting possible sites, especially in Colorado and Tennessee.

=== Development ===
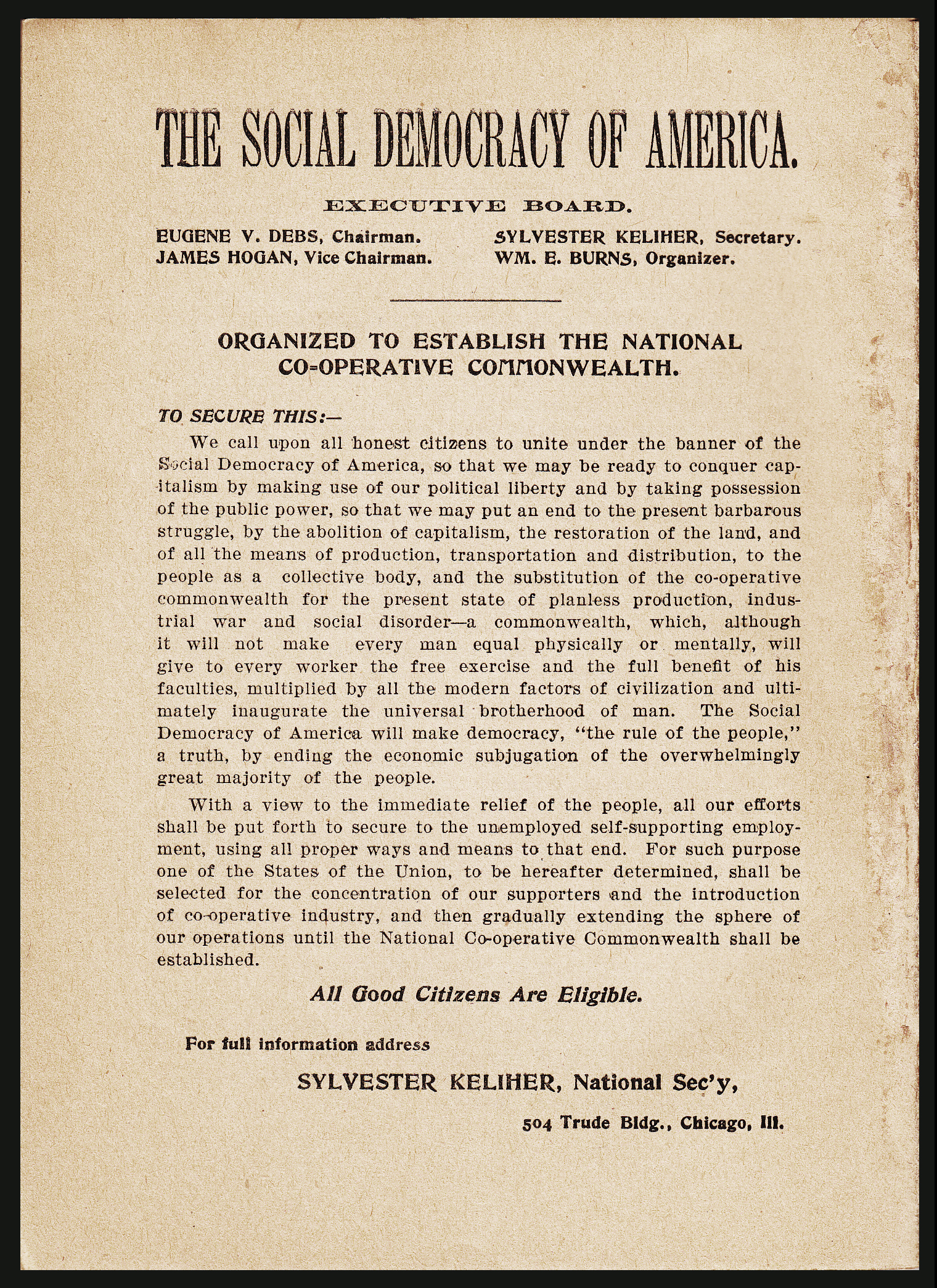
This 1897 ad by the SDA emphasizes that "one of the States of the Union, to be hereafter determined, shall be selected for concentration of our members and the introduction of cooperative industry"

The SDA began as a Chicago-centric organization. According to the published statement of Secretary Sylvester Keliher, during the organization's first month of existence there were 50 branches established, of which 11 were located in the city of Chicago. Keliher also indicated that more than 300 applications for the establishment of new branches had been received in the same period, of which 20 were from Chicago. He further stated that another 75 local lodges of the ARU had voted to join the SDA en bloc.

By the time of the SDA's convention on June 7, 1898, there was already a great deal of tension between the colonizationists and political actionists, the latter group accusing the former of trying to "pack" the convention with delegates from recently formed "paper branches" in the Chicago area. The divisions came to a head on June 10, when the convention heard the reports of its platform committee. The majority report, presented by Victor Berger and Margaret Haile, recommended the abandonment of the colonization scheme.

The minority report, written by John F. Lloyd but read to the convention by J.S. Ingalls, favored the two- pronged approach adopted a year earlier. The platform question caused long and bitter debate, lasting until 2 am the next morning, when a roll call vote showed 53 for the colonization platform and 37 against. With the defeat of the political action platform, Isaac Hourwich led a walkout of the minority to Revere House across the street, where the dissidents founded the Social Democratic Party of America (SDPA), which in 1901 merged with other groups to become the Socialist Party of America.

=== Cooperative Brotherhood ===
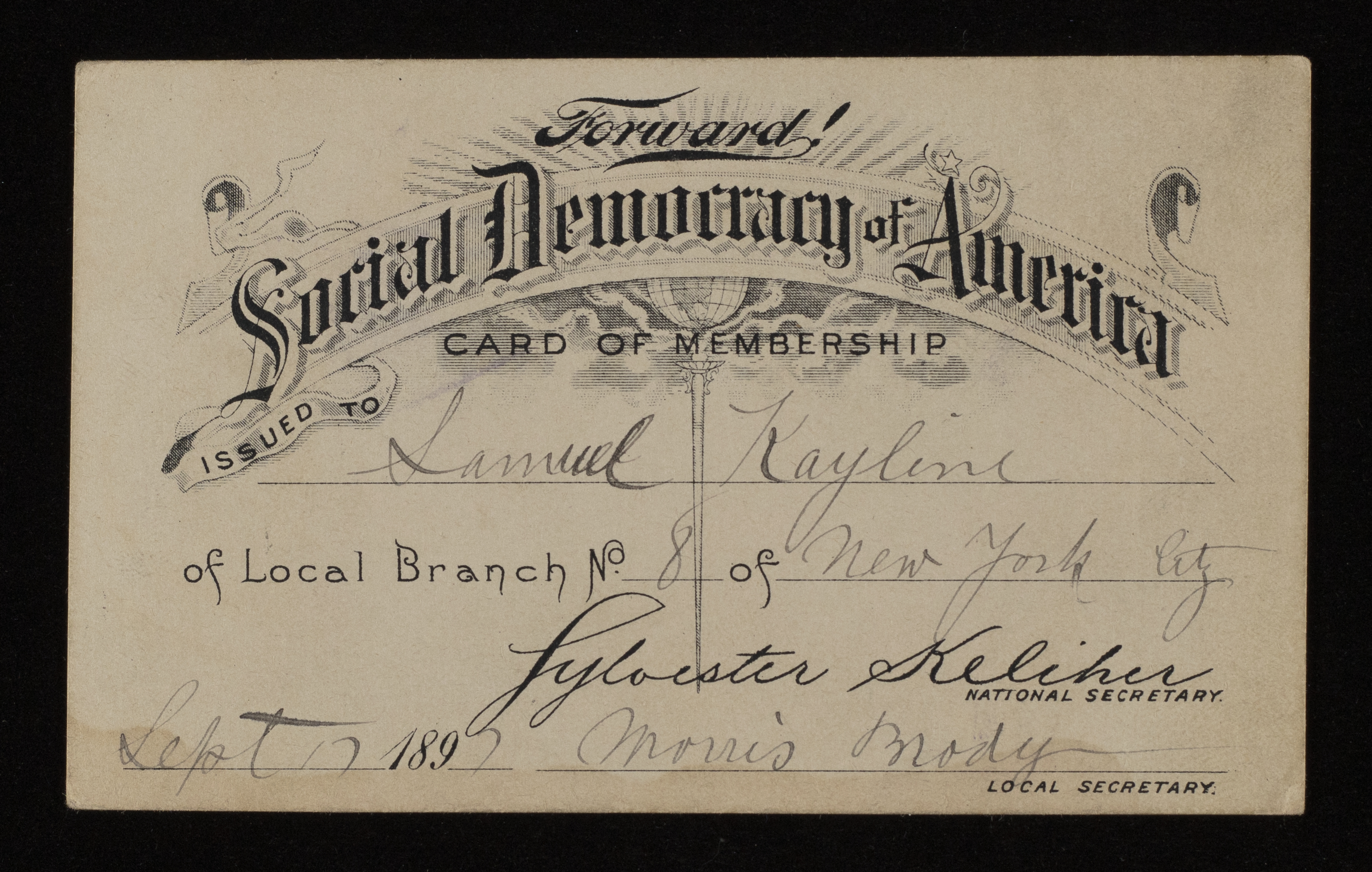
SDA membership card issued September 17, 1897

The majority attempted to carry out their colonization scheme and published three more issues of the Social Democrat, but financial difficulties forced them to halt the fourth issue while it was in type. Fearing that the organization might go under if a colony was not established immediately, they authorized Cyrus Field Willard to locate a colony and "do what in his judgment appeared the right thing to do". Willard went to Seattle to consult with SDA member J.B. Fowler, who pointed out the good harbors on southern Puget Sound. There they found Henry W. Stein, who was politically sympathetic to them and had just become the executor of some land in rural Kitsap County that was open for sale.

In September 1898, the SDA re-incorporated in Seattle as the Cooperative Brotherhood and on October 18 they purchased 260 acres (1.1 km^{2}) for $6,000. The first colonists arrived on October 20, 1898. A new organizational structure was put into place, with members paying a $1 initiation fee and $1 monthly dues—the intention being that the dues would provide a constant monthly income to subsidize the initial phase of the colonization effort. In addition, a prospectus was issued, proposing the generation of $5 million in operating capital through the sale of $10 shares of non-dividend paying stock, with additional funds raised through the sale of low-interest bonds to supporters. National headquarters were established in Seattle.

While never reaching more than about 120 inhabitants, the colony thrived for a few years. Originally named Brotherhood, it gradually came to be referred to by its inhabitants as Burley, after the nearby Burley Creek. A colony scrip was created that included a $1 denomination for an eight-hour work day and smaller units, called minims, for minutes worked over or less than six hours.

Circle City was the informal name of a group of buildings near the water. The colony subsisted on agriculture, fishing and logging. It also earned income by selling cigars, jam, subscriptions to its magazines and memberships in the B.C. It also rented out use of its mill, and rooms in its Commonwealth Hotel for visitors.

Colonization Commission Secretary Willard, who initially led the Washington colonization effort, departed in 1899 to join a Theosophist colony in Point Loma, California. The Brotherhood was later governed by a twelve-man board of trustees who were elected by mail vote each December for staggered four- year terms. A board of directors managed the affairs of the colony itself, and was elected every January. Members of the Cooperative Brotherhood who were not residents of the colony organized in local chapters called Temples of the Knights of the Brotherhood in places such as Chicago.

Its newspaper, the Co-operator, stayed in publication from December 1898 to June 1906. Originally an eight-page weekly, it changed to a 32-page monthly in 1902 and to a 16-page magazine in October 1903.

The colony went into decline in the late 1900s. In December 1904, some members re-incorporated into the Burley Rochdale Mercantile Association, and three months later the Cooperative Brotherhood itself re-organized into a joint stock company. By 1908, the Brotherhood had 150 members, only 17 of whom were residents of the colony. The trustees called a meeting of stockholders to dissolve the Brotherhood in late 1912, but the motion lacked the required two-thirds majority, whereupon those who were in favor of disbanding took the company to court. On January 10, 1913, Judge John P. Young ordered the Cooperative Brotherhood dissolved and put its assets into receivership. The last of its properties were sold off in 1924.

== Prominent members ==
- Victor L. Berger
- W. P. Borland
- Abraham Cahan
- James F. Carey
- Jesse Cox
- Eugene V. Debs
- Theodore Debs
- Alfred S. Edwards
- Paul Grottkau
- Richard J. Hinton
- G. A. Hoehn
- Isaac Hourwich
- Sylvester Keliher
- Margaret Haile
- Frederic Heath
- James Hogan
- Meyer London
- William Mailly
- Louis E. Miller
- Lucy Parsons
- Max Pine
- Seymour Stedman
- Cyrus Field Willard
- Morris Winchevsky
- Michael Zametkin

== See also ==
- Brotherhood of the Cooperative Commonwealth
- Socialist Party of Washington

== Sources ==
- LeWarne, Charles Pierce. Utopias on Puget Sound 1885-1915. Seattle: University of Washington Press.
- Quint, Howard. The Forging of American Socialism. Columbia: University of South Carolina Press.

== Publications ==
- Merrie England. Social Democracy Library. No. 1. Chicago. Social Democracy of America. 1897.
- Three in One: A Trinity of Arguments on Socialism. Social Democracy Library. No. 2. Chicago. The Social Democracy. 1898.
- Cyrus Field Willard, Security of Employment. Chicago: Social Democracy of America, June 1898.
