= Louis Miller =

Russian-Jewish-American political activist and newspaper editor

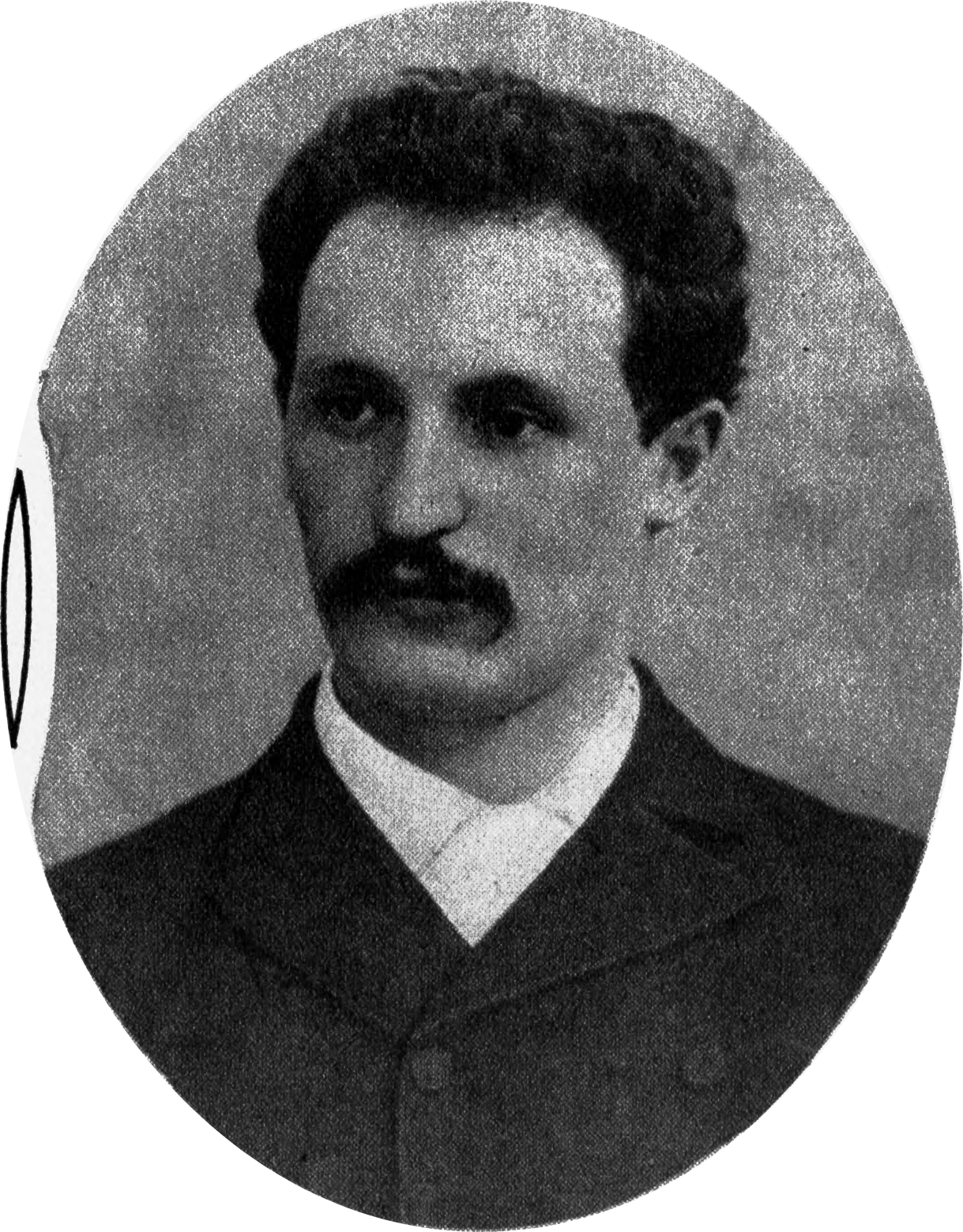
Miller in 1892

Louis E. Miller (born Efim Samuilovich Bandes; April 1866 – May 22, 1927) was a Lithuanian-born Jewish-American newspaper publisher, writer, and political activist who emigrated to the United States of America in 1884. A trade union organizer and newspaper editor, Miller is best remembered as a founding editor of Di Arbeiter Tsaytung (The Workers' Newspaper), the first Yiddish-language weekly published in America, and a co-founder with Abraham Cahan of the Jewish Daily Forward, the country's first and foremost Yiddish-language daily.

After leaving the Forward in 1905 due to editorial differences with Cahan, Miller established a Yiddish daily newspaper of his own, Di Warheit (The Truth), which attained a measure of success until its readership was shattered with the coming of World War I.

== Biography ==
=== Early years ===
Efim Samuilovich Bandes was born to a Jewish family in April 1866 in Vilna (today's Vilnius, Lithuania), then part of the Pale of Settlement of the Russian Empire. While barely a teenager, Efim (who later took the name Louis Miller) and his older brother joined a revolutionary circle headed by Aaron Zundelevich, seeking the overthrow of the antisemitic Tsarist regime in Russia.

This revolutionary career in imperial Russia was quickly short-circuited by the Tsarist secret police, however, with study circle leader Kundelevich arrested for his political offenses in 1879. To avoid a similar fate, the Bandes brothers were forced to flee the country, briefly living in a series of European metropolises that included Zurich, Berlin, and Paris.

=== Emigration to America ===
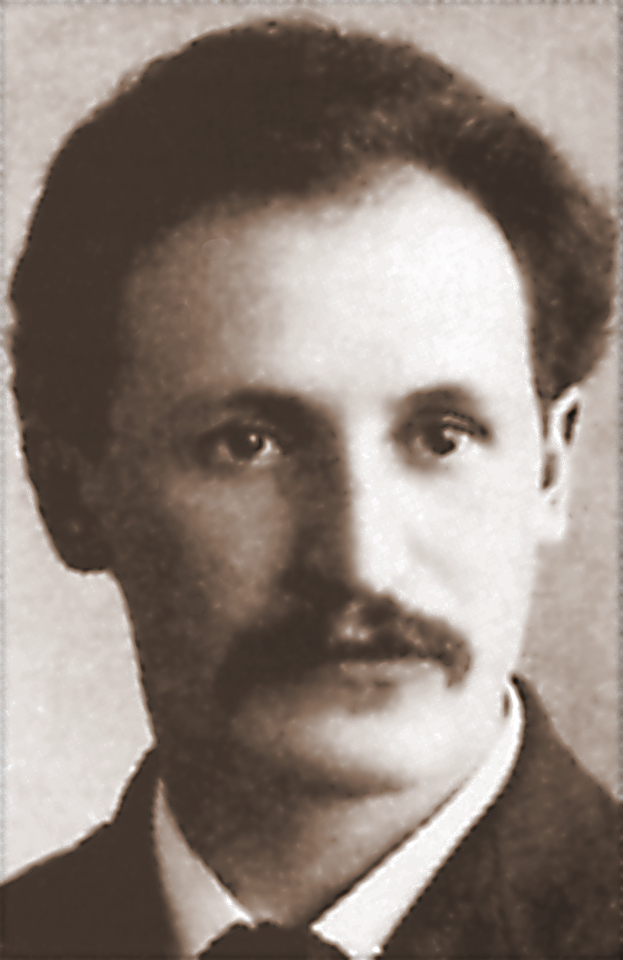
Miller c. 1900

Efim Bandes arrived in New York City in 1884 and soon took on a new Americanized name, Louis Miller. Miller worked for a time in one of the city's sweatshops, an experience which would later move him towards trade union activity.

Miller immediately joined the fledgling Russian Workers Union (Russian: Russkii Rabochii Soiuz; Yiddish: Rusisher Arbayter Fareyn) that had emerged in the city around this time, thereby making contact with a number of leading Jewish left wing political activists of the day, including Nicholas Aleinikoff (founder of the group), writer and journalist Abraham Cahan, Gregory Weinstein, trade union activist Leon Malkiel, and future journalist Victor Jarros. The Workers Union maintained a significant library of political reading material and conducted meetings which delved into Russian current events and various social questions of the day.

Despite its name, the Russian Workers Union was a cloistered group of intellectuals with few contents to the actual working class — a fact which led to dissatisfaction among some members of the group. Late in 1884 the organization split, with Cahan an Miller taking the lead in organizing a new organization called the Russian Labor Lyceum, an entity which presented public speakers with the aim of improving the educational level and political understanding of Russian-speaking workers in New York. Cahan and Miller both used their access to the rostrum of these political lectures to hone their oratorical skills, additionally making contact with prominent Socialist leaders of the day, including the German-speaking journalist Alexander Jonas and exiled nobleman Sergei Schevitsch. As was the case with the Russian Workers Union, membership of the Russian Labor Lyceum remained by and large limited to intellectuals and the group's activities ultimately proved largely ineffective.

Another organization quickly followed, the Russian-Jewish Workingmen's Association, the name of which made explicit the ethnic composition of the Russian émigré community in America. Rather than conducting its meetings and discussions in Russian, this new organization made use of the common language of the Jewish working class, Yiddish. For the first time, participants in this organization included not only radical intellectuals but also common workers from Russia and various nations of Central Europe, united across national boundaries by their common tongue. Miller was active in this organization, as well as its direct successor formed through merger, the Jewish Workingmen's Association.

The Jewish Workingmen's Association maintained close contact with the German language socialist movement, including the fledgling New Yorker Volkszeitung (New York People's Newspaper) and the United German Trades labor federation. In July 1886 the organization voted to join the host organization of the German movement, the Socialist Labor Party of America, thereby bringing together socialist German and Russian-Jewish activists in a unified organization.

Miller was also involved in the launch of a Russian language newspaper, Znania (The Banner) in 1889, co-editing the paper for more than a year. Miller was joined in his work at the paper by his brother, Lev Bandes, but the latter died soon after the launch of the publication, leaving Miller alone in the new world.

In 1890, Miller joined with Philip Krantz and Abraham Cahan in launching Di Arbeiter Tsaytung (The Workers' Newspaper), the first socialist newspaper published in the United States in the Yiddish language. This turn to Yiddish journalism — the daily language of a great percentage of the Jewish immigrant working class — would be met with success and in 1897 he joined with Cahan in establishing a Yiddish socialist daily, Forverts (The Jewish Daily Forward).

Miller was a popular writer and a talented public speaker, regarded as one of the best in New York's Jewish left wing milieu. He demonstrated a firm and unshakable commitment to the ideas of socialism and could move a crowd to loud applause with his aggressive rhetoric allayed against capitalist exploiters and other enemies of the socialist cause.

Miller was a delegate to the June 1898 convention of the Social Democracy of America and together with Morris Winchevsky, Meyer London was part of the minority group favoring political action rather than colonization that bolted the gathering to form the Social Democratic Party of America (SDP). He was the SDP's candidate for the New York state legislature in the 4th Assembly District in November 1898.

=== Artistic writing ===
Miller did not limit himself to political journalism, venturing into the writing of Yiddish language plays and poetry, and venturing into the field of theatrical criticism. He also worked as a translator, rendering The Civil War in France by Karl Marx and the poetry of Walt Whitman into Yiddish.

=== Split with Cahan ===
In 1905 Miller and Cahan developed political and philosophical differences and parted company, with Cahan assuming full editorial control of the Forward while Miller resigned to launch his own daily Yiddish newspaper, Di Warheit (The Truth). Miller and Cahan waged editorial war against one another, with Miller more than holding his own in the contest.

Whereas Cahan's perspective expressed by the Forward was socialist and internationalist, Miller came to outspokenly support the ideas of Zionism — belief in the necessity of establishment in the Middle East of a Jewish national homeland. Towards this end in 1911 Miller made an extensive trip to Palestine, interviewing public figures and writing of his experiences for readers of his newspaper in America.

=== Later years ===
During the years of World War I, Miller took what was for his Jewish readership the controversial position of support of the Entente allies against Germany — the Allies including among them the hated Tsarist Russian regime. This position dramatically impacted the circulation of Di Warheit as his anti-Russian readers defected from the ranks of subscribers.

=== Death and legacy ===
Miller died of heart disease in New York City on May 22, 1927, following an illness lasting one week. He was 61 years old at the time of his death.
