= Social Democratic Federation (U.S., 1889) =

American political party

The Social Democratic Federation (SDF) was an American political party established as a result of a factional split in the Socialist Labor Party in 1889. Moving its headquarters through a succession of cities, the organization landed in Cleveland, Ohio, merging with the Social Democracy of America — forerunner of the Socialist Party of America — in the summer of 1897.

== Organizational history ==
=== Background ===
Together with the Central Labor Union of New York and other organizations, the SLP had formed a United Labor Party to compete in elections in the city and state of New York. In 1886 it invited Henry George to be its candidate for mayor of New York. In the campaign that followed George won 67,000 votes, second place. The next year, however, George's followers took full control of the party, ousting the SLP at its convention in Syracuse in August 1887. The socialist and a faction of the CLU then organized the Progressive Labor party that September. The election results for that year showed the ULP with 72,000 and the PLP with 5,000 votes.

These experiences led a group in the party, the "Lassalleans", to advocate the abandoning of the tactic of a large labor party with union participation, and to favor a more traditional approach with an independent SLP ticket and no organizational ties with the unions. This faction was led by Wilhelm Rosenberg and J. E. Bushe, editors of party newspapers Der Sozialist and The Workmens Advocate, respectively. In 1888 the party nominated a large slate for U.S. Congress, New York State Assembly, and the New York City Council, headed by Alexander Jonas for Mayor of New York and James Edward Hall for Governor. In September a resolution binding the party to independent political action was put to referendum vote of the party binding it to independent political action and accepted.

The electoral results, however, were unimpressive. Jonas received 2,645 votes, Hall 3,000, and the electors 2,068. This gave impetus for the more stridently Marxist wing of the party, centered around the German daily New Yorker Volkszeitung and led by Alexander Jonas, Lucian Sanial and others. From January to August 1889 the Marxist and Lassalean wings of the party fought bitterly over the direction of the party. After being unable to get the party's Board of Appeals to remove the Lassallean members of the National Executive Committee for official misconduct, the Volkzeitung forces called a meeting of all the sections of Greater New York to meet at Clarendon Hall on September 10, 1889 to vote to dismiss the officers from the NEC, which such a meeting was legally able to do.

At this meeting things did not go as planned, however. Members from the pro-Rosenberg American branch were shouted down and reportedly threatened with violence by members from the German and Yiddish-language Sections. The meeting dismissed Rosenberg and the others, and replaced them with officers from the Volkszeitung faction. Rosenberg and the Lassaleans were apparently physically ejected from the party headquarters and the parties newspapers, funds and property were taken over by the new NEC.

== The split ==
Both wings called a national convention of loyal party branches at Chicago to strengthen their claim to be the "real" Socialist Labor Party. However, the loss of the newspapers and party funds limited the Rosenberg factions ability to contact the SLP branches and members so they could only summon 23 small sections of the party to its congress while the Sanial-Jonas convention could summon 27 "large" ones. Their cause was not helped when the Board of Supervision, which had been wavering refused to recognize their convention.

The Rosenberg Socialist Labor Party changed its name in later years to the "Social Democratic Federation." Although originally quite strong, gradually lost members largely because of its lack of periodical of the stature of the daily Volkszeitung, though it did publish its own weekly newspaper Der Volks-Anwalt (The People's Advocate). There was an abortive effort to unite with the Sanial faction in 1892, by which time the SLP had already embraced independent political action and had grown to over 100 sections. In 1896 the group changed its name to the Social Democratic Federation, hoping to gain members from the SLP during its internal conflict.

The party became known as the "traveling faction" or "party on wheels" because of its frequent change of headquarters. Indeed, in its eight years of existence it moved from Cincinnati to Baltimore, to Buffalo, to Cincinnati again, to Chicago and finally to Cleveland at the time of its merger with the SDA.

In 1898, the SDF merged into the Social Democracy of America, providing the SDA its second foreign language publication, Der Volkanswalt.

== See also ==
- Wilhelm Rosenberg
