= Greie =

Greie is a German surname. Notable people with the surname include:

- Antye Greie (born 1969), German musician and new media artist
- Johanna Greie (1864–1911), German-American writer, socialist, and reformer
