= Equality Colony =

American socialist colony (1897-1907)

Coordinates: 49°N 122°W

Logo of the Brotherhood of the Cooperative Commonwealth, the entity behind Equality Colony in Washington state

Equality Colony was a United States socialist colony founded in Skagit County, Washington by the socialist Brotherhood of the Cooperative Commonwealth in 1897. It was meant to serve as a model that would lead to the conversion of the rest of Washington, and later the entire continent, to socialism. It survived as an Edward Bellamy-inspired intentional community until it succumbed to internal divisions in 1907.

== Brotherhood of the Cooperative Commonwealth ==
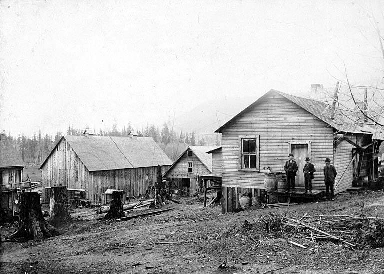
The Equality Colony, circa 1900

The origins of the Equality Colony lay in a grand strategic plan of New England reformers in the mid-1890s. Socialist Labor Party member F.G.R. Gordon suggested that many socialist colonies be established in a single western state, thus gaining local ascendancy. Norman Wallace Lermond, a journalist and farmer in Warren, Maine, and Ed Pelton were intrigued by the idea. Cyrus Field Willard of the Bellamy-inspired socialist Nationalist Clubs also was a proponent of this massing of those who held progressive thought. While Gordon had suggested Texas, Willard, Richard J. Hinton of Washington, DC, and Wilfred P. Borland of Bay City, Michigan, selected Washington as the state that was most suitable for the project. Lermond and Pelton started a vigorous letter-writing campaign to Henry Demarest Lloyd and other reformers advocating the plan. He suggested that socialist colonists would initiate the collective ownership of the means of production in the state by voting in a socialist government. Lermond envisioned an organization of many local unions ("L.U.s") that would provide the colonists with financial, material, and moral support, coordinated by a national "center or union" controlled by seven trustees. His immediate model was the New England Emigrant Aid Company, which colonized Kansas with abolitionists prior to the U.S. Civil War in order to make the territory a free state. Lloyd gave the plan modest financial backing.

Meanwhile Lermond began forming socialist hubs in Maine, as others were being formed in Washington state. Lermond started the first local union in Warren, Maine on October 18, 1895, and Pelton established the second in Damariscotta Mills, Maine that winter. In December 1895, Lermond issued a call for the creation of more local unions in the pages of the New York Commonwealth and the Coming Nation. In the spring of that year he announced he was setting up an "organizational meeting" to create a "National Union of the Brotherhood of the Cooperative Commonwealth" scheduled to be held in St. Louis on July 24–26, 1896, congruent with that year's People's Party national convention, to which he was a delegate. A formal "call" for this convention was published in Coming Nation July 11 and 18, and was endorsed by Henry Demarest Lloyd, Eugene Debs, Frank Parsons, William D. P. Bliss and Eltweed Pomeroy.

This convention, however, did not materialize. Lermond could not get away from the Populist convention, and Imogene Fales attended a National Cooperative Congress that created a new American Cooperative union with her as secretary.

=== Organization ===
The Brotherhood of the Cooperative Commonwealth was officially organized through a mail referendum conducted through the Coming Nation, which was quickly becoming the movement's semi-official newspaper. On September 19, the Coming Nation announced the adoption of a constitution and the election of seven officers: Lloyd as president, Lermond as secretary, B. Franklin Hunter as treasurer, Frank Parsons dean, Morrison I. Swift organizer, I. E. Dean master workman and A. S. Edwards, of the Coming Nation editor.

Nameplate of Industrial Freedom, newspaper of the Equality Colony published at Edison, Washington from 1898 through 1902

The constitution's preamble committed the organization to three broad goals: "1. To educate the people in the principles of Socialism; 2. To unite all socialists in one fraternal association; 3. To establish cooperative colonies and industries in one state until that state is socialized." Each of the eight elected trustees would head a department of the organization. The president would theoretically head an executive department to generally supervise the group, but the most important position was secretary, which would head the colonization department charged with planting socialistic colonies. There were also departments for education (headed by the dean), organization, which would create new local unions, exchange, industry (headed by the Master Workman) and finance.

Not all of these positions were filled, however. Lloyd and Hunter declined their positions, and the post of distributor was apparently unfilled. In new elections held in January 1897, radical minister Myron W. Reed was elected president and an attempt made to draft Eugene V. Debs by electing him national organizer. However, Debs was at the time a fledgling socialist preoccupied with miners' union strikes in the Mountain West and never served in an active capacity as the BCC's organizer. Debs nevertheless warmed up to the idea of colonizing a relatively unpopulated western state and making use of the ballot box to win control of state government and maintained close contact with the organization, meeting with Lermond in Terre Haute on May 24 to discuss possible unification of his American Railway Union with the BCC at convention scheduled three weeks later.

Meanwhile, Victor Berger and his group urged him to create a new socialist organization committed to political action, not colonization. Lermond, Parsons and Reed attended the June 1897 convention of the American Railway Union, which created the Social Democracy of America. The BCC did not join the Social Democracy of America, rejecting its "class struggle" thesis with a vision of a colony that would include middle-class professionals and "everybody who believes in cooperation" and not just "the laboring classes so called". Weakened by the loss of Debs and the defection of some of its membership to the new SDA, the Brotherhood of the Cooperative Commonwealth set out to start its first intentional community, in Washington.

== Equality Colony ==
=== Plans ===
Logo of Equality Colony, 1898

By mid-1897 the BCC had about 2200 members in 130 local unions. After short tours in Tennessee and Arkansas, Lermond announced that August that Washington would be the most likely state for colonization. The southern states were already well settled and faced the "Negro question", while Washington had a small, sparse population with liberal inclinations and a Populist governor who was rumored to be sympathetic to the BCC. There were also a number of local unions already in the state, seven of which had sites available.

On September 1, 1897 G.E. "Ed" Pelton left Maine for the Pacific Northwest to secure land for a colony. After visiting several sites, on October 15 he made a down payment of $100 to Mathias Decker, a conservative Skagit County farmer, for 280 acres (1.1 km^{2}) of land in Blanchard, Washington located 2 miles northeast of the hamlet of Edison. Additional purchases and contributions were made until the colony reached an area of 600 acres (2.4 km^{2}) by the summer of 1898.

=== Settlement ===
The first fifteen settlers arrived on November 1, 1897 and named the colony after Edward Bellamy's new book, Equality. By the time that the national board, their families and others arrived in March, the first building, Fort Bellamy, was finished and several others were in progress. However most members of the BCC board stayed in nearby Edison, where they leased a "national headquarters" for the brotherhood. By that summer membership had reached 3,000 members and 18 states had organizers. Through the organization department and the group's newspaper, Industrial Freedom (which began in May), the Brotherhood maintained its "national character".

Former Appeal to Reason writer George Boomer (1862–1915) was among the editors of Industrial Freedom, the weekly newspaper of Equality Colony.

However, dissension developed between the colonists at Equality and the BCC leaders at Edison. The colonists resented that their money was being used to keep the administration in town, while they lived in the crude, unfinished buildings at the colony site. They also objected to the administration's emphasis on the creation of a national organization and other colonies, feeling that the more immediate goal should be the completion of Equality. In early April, at a contentious meeting of the two factions, a plan to start an additional colony at Edison of the administrators was defeated and the Equality colonists proposed an amendment giving the colony complete independence in internal affairs, which passed by a vote of 298 to 176.

August Lermond resigned from the BCC and returned to Maine, where he founded a new group, the Industrial Brotherhood. By the end of the year, most of the board members had left. In January 1899, a new slate of officers favored by the colonists was elected, and that February BCC headquarters was moved to Equality. From that point membership in the BCC fell to nearly 300, material support and new members from the outside dried up and Industrial Freedom circulation plummeted. The Brotherhood of the Cooperative Commonwealth as an organization was subsumed by Equality. While lip service was given to the idea of planting new colonies and socializing Washington for the next few years little was actually done toward those objectives and were eventually forgotten.

The colony flourished for a few years, building two large apartments, a barn, a dining room and kitchen, a school house, a public hall, a store room, a printing office, a saw mill, a root house, a blacksmith and copper shop, an apiary, a bakery, a cereal and coffee house, and a milk house. Its population fluctuated, but was about 100 by the spring of 1903, when only the "die hards" remained. Harry Ault, who would later play a role in the Seattle general strike of 1919 as editor as the Seattle Union Record, arrived with his family at age 14 in April 1898 and began to learn journalism and printing by working on Industrial Freedom. He eventually became its editor, until the publication folded in December 1902. He also started Young Socialist in 1899 for the colony's children.

In 1900 and 1901 some colonists left Equality to found a new community on Whidbey Island called the Free Land Association, or Freeland. This colony should not be confused with Equality in its later stages which was sometimes referred to as Freeland Colony.

== Freeland ==
In autumn 1904 the colony was visited by Alexander Horr, a proponent of Theodor Hertzka’s "Freeland" concept. He returned next year with more of his followers and soon the colony's population grew by 30%. By the summer of 1905 Horr and his followers achieved drastic changes to the BCCs constitution so that it would adhere to the Freeland concept. New "local unions" were established. The changes were not appreciated by the colony's older residents who resisted the conversion of the colony to the new scheme in late 1905. The colony became bitterly divided between the two factions, sometimes resulting in violence.

The final factor in the demise of the colony occurred on the night of February 6, 1906, when one or more unknown persons set fire to several buildings. The worst loss was the barn, which burned completely to the ground, killing most of the colony's cattle. The perpetrator was never identified. Each faction blamed the other for the arson. A suit was filed in Skagit County to dissolve the colony and the BCC went into receivership. Its history ended when its land was sold for $12,500 to John J. Peth on June 1, 1907. A few families stayed in the area on plots of land that they owned individually.

== See also ==
- The Cooperative Brotherhood

== Sources ==
- LeWarne, Charles P., "Equality Colony: The Plan to Socialize Washington," Pacific Northwest Quarterly, vol. 59, no. 3 (July 1968), pp. 137–146. In JSTOR
- LeWarne, Charles (1995). Utopias on Puget Sound, 1885–1915. Seattle: University of Washington Press. ISBN 9780295741055. OCLC 47010928.
- Pelton, G.E. "Equality's Struggle for Existence," Industrial Freedom, whole no. 55 (May 27, 1899), pg. 2.
- Quint, Howard H (1953). The Forging of American Socialism. Columbia, SC: Howard H. ASIN B000GJHY72. OCLC 988670668.
- Smith, Frederick E., and Lowe, Florence M. Equality Colony. [F.M. Lowe?], 1988.
