= Morrison I. Swift =

American social organizer and activist (1856–1946)

Morrison Isaac Swift (1856–1946) was an American social theorist, organizer and activist. A prolific writer, speaker and pamphleteer, he wrote a number of books on social and political theory and several works of fiction. Regarded by some as an anarchist and by others as a liberal, Swift was an outspoken anti-imperialist, anti-capitalist and a tireless promoter of socialism and public ownership. He was anti-slavery and oppression, an advocate of social justice for the unemployed and the working poor and a champion of freedom for the individual.

Swift was described in a political magazine in 1894 as "quiet in bearing, & possessed of a certain personal charm, winning in his manner before a conversational group, & very able before a promiscuous crowd. He is well educated, has traveled, & has dwelt much upon economic ills & their cures. He is a socialist of the extreme type. He advocates peaceful methods, but would not hesitate at radical measures provided they promised success." His obituary noted that he was "a person of unusual gentleness, humility and charm and beloved by all who knew him." William James, quoting Swift in a lecture at the Lowell Institute in Boston in 1906, called him, "that valiant anarchistic writer." He was also regarded as "One of the most violent & prolific anti-imperialists."

== Life ==
Morrison I. Swift was born in Ravenna, Ohio. After attending Western Reserve University for two years, he graduated from Williams College in 1879, subsequently receiving a philosophy fellowship from Johns Hopkins, earning his Ph.D. in political economy in 1885. Swift briefly assumed the presidency of Hobart College where he built up the college's library and gained a reputation for assigning post-graduate level work to undergraduates. His students were overjoyed when he left to spend the next two years at the University of Berlin studying philosophy. On returning to the US, he declined the offer of a college presidency and turned to work in the social settlement movement in Philadelphia and New York City. He initially worked with Herbert Baxter Adams of Johns Hopkins, who was interested in bringing a historical perspective to the study of Social Sciences, but Swift's progressive ideas soon roused strong opposition from the trustees of Johns Hopkins causing him to return his Ph.D.

Swift became a major social activist. He led the New England Industrial Army, a contingent of Coxey's Army, in the march on Washington, D.C. He was credited as being the leader of every major demonstration of the unemployed that took place in Boston between 1894 & 1914. Moving to Los Angeles to become editor of The Public Ownership Review, Swift was involved in the Altruria Colony, an experiment in cooperative industry and farming in the Santa Rosa Valley, and was an organizer of the socialist Equality Colony in Skagit County, Washington. In 1901, Swift, who was openly critical of President William McKinley, was briefly imprisoned after McKinley's assassination by an anarchist. Returning to Boston, he was chief lecturer and director of the Humanist Forum from 1907 to 1914 and contributed to the Boston Transcript. Swift lost the support of many of his anarchist, pacifist and socialist followers when he stated that he was in favor of increased militarization and the US entry into the First World War. He lost more credibility when he began to blame Jews for America's economic ills. Morrison I. Swift retired to Newton Centre, Massachusetts where he boarded in the home of a music teacher and author. From there he continued his frequent contributions to the Boston Transcript.

== Thought ==
Morrison I. Swift begins his book Human Submission with a series of anecdotes about suicide, death from starvation and other evils, illustrating the plight of the poor and unemployed. He relates the story of a clerk who lost his job through illness and, unable to provide for his family, committed suicide by drinking carbolic acid. It is the reaction to incidents such as this that fuel Swift's ideas.

As Morrison I. Swift's writings were often more of a reaction to incidents of social injustice and as his outlook changed over time, his thinking is not presented in a systematic way in his works. Swift's thinking shows tendencies towards anarchism, with his insistence on the sovereignty of the individual, and comments on class warfare leading to the overthrow of the existing corporate/capitalist system; socialism, with his advocacy of cooperative labour, support for the unemployed and social justice for the working poor; libertarianism, with his commitment to taking power from government and placing it in the hands of individuals and the redistribution of wealth through a voluntary, decentralized economic system based on democratic rule; fascism, with his support of militarism and draconian methods of controlling Jews; and Marxism, with his dedication to placing the means of production in the hands of the workers through public ownership of industry.

Swift took a simplistic evolutionary approach to social ills. He started with a noble savage ideal, a primitive state in which mankind once lived in harmony with each other and with the environment. As mankind evolved, labour became divided between the crude and brutish hunter-warriors, and the refined, artistic intellectuals. The dull, belligerent warriors came to dominate the peaceful artisans, resulting in the unimaginative brutes becoming the ruling class while the higher types were forced into the status of permanently subjugated producers. This class structure of "organized enmity" has existed for so long that it is now accepted as normal and people can no longer think in terms of freedom. Swift went so far as to propose that, over time, the unrelenting oppression of the working class had resulted in physical changes, a "deformed brain-physique" and questioned whether the "structural malformation of human mentality is physically unalterable and irremediable."

Swift believed that the class based capitalist economy blocked the natural human evolution towards freedom and liberty, insisting that "The law above all laws is man’s obligation to be free." He felt that to continue on with the current class structure would lead to the suicide of the human race.

The remedy that would ensure the continued evolution and survival of the human race was to return power to the hands of the workers. But before the social and economic revolution could take place, there must be a revolution inside each individual. The working class must throw off the acceptance of servitude to the ruling elite. Thinking people will see that, "the first step for freedom must be a revolution in their own heads." Once the idea of the right to personal freedom was accepted, there were three fronts on which mankind must resist implacably, furiously and unceasingly until the masters fling off their vestments of power. These were state, school and church.

For rebellion against the state, Swift advocated public ownership of industry. He wrote that the rich had robbed from the poor and the poor had every right to take back what was stolen from them. Although Swift was writing about public ownership of industry, his statements have been taken as advocating open class warfare, encouraging individuals to seize the property of the rich. He believed in publicly owned industry with a voluntary and decentralized economy based on a "system of self-directing industrial groups." Swift's petition to the United States Senate in 1894 recommended an amendment to the U.S. Constitution establishing the right of every man to gainful employment. He advocated the nationalization of railroads, the telegraph industry, mines and other businesses as well as programs to create jobs for the unemployed through the establishment of farms and factories.

He rejected the anarchist position of the abolition of government, but desired the replacement of the congressional-capitalist system with a government more conducive to individual freedom and growth. Swift recognized that government was necessary to social order and was in favor of parliamentary democracy based on proportional representation. The ideal government would have a regulatory function over state-owned property, farms and industry, have powers to make laws and support an army. In 1911 he submitted bills to the General Court of Massachusetts on subjects as varied as the control of pine forests and regulation of prostitution. The key to this move to an advanced industrial society was education. Swift believed that education should not be the mere memorization of facts imposed by an oppressive system, but a turning loose of the creative faculties through the free release of knowledge and wisdom. He encouraged young people to wage war against the established patterns of behaviour imposed upon them by an unjust and oppressive system.

Essential to the re-awakening of human potential was the denial of religion. The human suffering caused through social injustice "invincibly prove religion a nullity." "Man raised his stupidity to infinite magnitude and called it God." Religion, for Swift, was another form of slavery, forcing the individual to submit to an authoritarian cause. The figure of Christ became "a perpetual inhibition … a gruesome spell confusing man's insight, mocking his faculties, dulling and deadening his will." "The supernatural was captured by mediocrity."

With his evolutionary approach to human development, Swift traced the ignorance and superstition of Christianity to the religion of the Old Testament, a product of the "Hebrew mentality." This line of thinking led to an anti-Semitic view of Jews as a threat to human and economic development. He wrote that Jewish immigration to the USA should be stopped; that Jews in the US be subjected to a birth quota, the punishment for exceeding the quota being sterilization. Jews should be made to identify themselves in all businesses and business transactions, including advertisements and shop signs.

Along with these authoritarian measures, Swift came to believe in the necessity of a standing army as protection against those who would force the US into slavery. While he wrote against the imperialism of the Spanish–American War, he supported the US entry into the First World War.

== Bibliography ==
- Bibliography of Morrison I. Swift
