= Wilhelm Rosenberg =

American dramatist

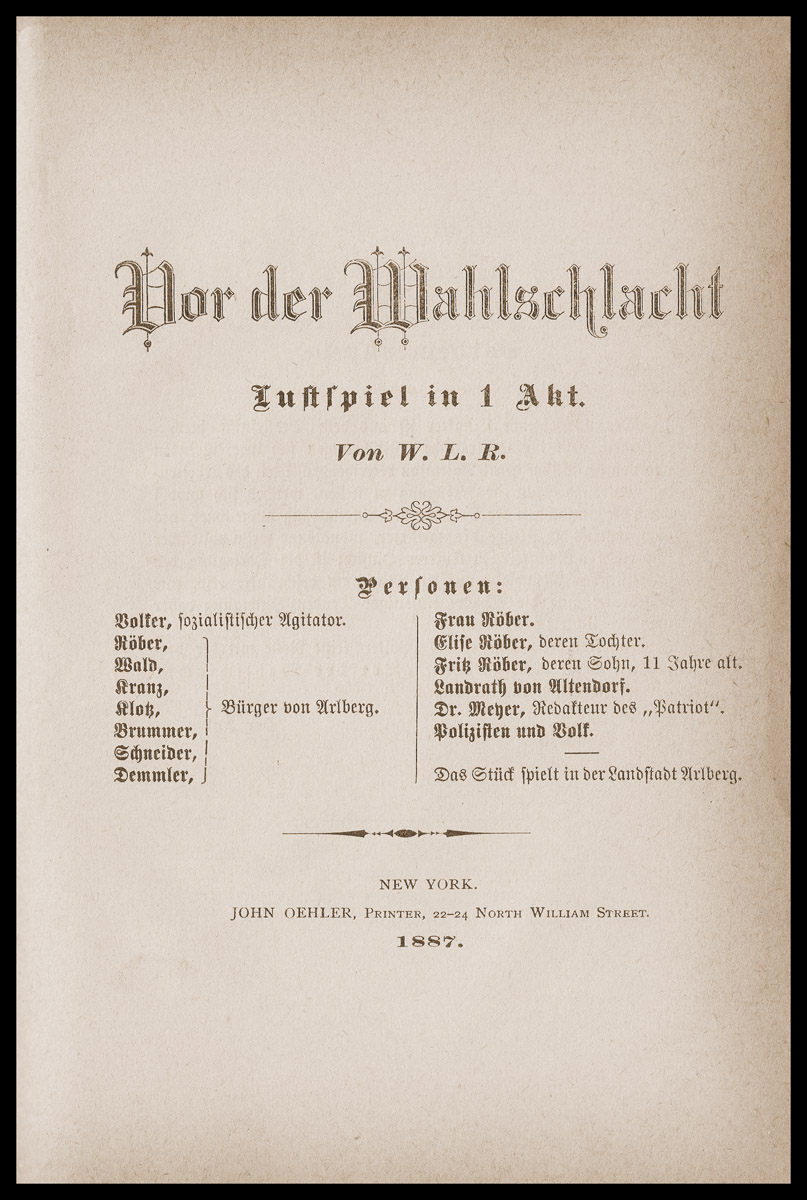
Title page of Wilhelm Rosenberg's 1887 pamphlet, Vor der Wahlschlacht: Lustspiel in 1 Akt. (Before the election battle: Comedy in one act).

Wilhelm Ludwig "William" Rosenberg (1850 – 1930s) was a German-American teacher, poet, playwright, journalist, and socialist political activist. He is best remembered as the head of the Socialist Labor Party of America from 1884 to 1889.

== Biography ==
=== Early years ===
Wilhelm Ludwig Rosenberg was born in Hamm, Westphalia, Kingdom of Prussia in January 1850. Rosenberg was university educated, and worked as a teacher of Latin and French in Frankfurt am Main.

Rosenberg was politically radical from an early age and was a contributor to Die Neue Welt (The New World), a German socialist newspaper.

=== Emigration to America ===
Rosenberg was forced to emigrate from Germany in 1880 under the pressure of the Anti-Socialist Laws of 1878, landing in America. Rosenberg resumed life as a language teacher in Boston for the Berlitz School of Languages. He joined the fledgling Socialist Labor Party of America (SLP) around this same time. Rosenberg subsequently moved to Chicago, where he served as editor of a succession of politically oriented newspapers, including Die Fackel (Sunday edition of the Chicagoer Arbeiter-Zeitung, 1881-1884), the SLP's official organ, Der Sozialist (1885–1889), Der Tramp (New York, 1888), and Vorwärts, (New York City, from 1892).

While in Chicago, Rosenberg wrote politically charged plays to be performed in the several working-class theatres of the city. One of these dramas, Die Nihilisten (The Nihilists), was performed in honor of the Paris Commune in 1882 and featured three future defendants in the 1886 Haymarket affair — Michael Schwab, August Spies, and Oscar Neebe — playing leading roles. The play dealt with legal proceedings against a group of Nihilists in the Russian Empire, who were sentenced to exile in Siberia, and finally freed by their comrades following the overthrow of the Tsar. In the May 18, 1882 performance in North Side Turner Hall, the role of the liberators was played by members of the local Lehr-und-Wehr Verein (Education and Defense Society), an armed workers' militia movement sweeping the German-American radical community in the Chicago area at the time. The implications of this casting could not be missed.

Another play by Rosenberg, Die Tochter des Proletairiers (The Proletarian's Daughter) was performed at the 1883 celebration of the Paris Commune in Chicago. This play dealt with the daughter of a class-conscious worker who fell in love with the son of a factory owner and was subsequently repudiated by her father.

By 1883 the membership of the SLP had fallen to an estimated 1500 members in just 30 Sections, a depressing atrophy which had led to the abandonment of the organization in April of that year even by its nominal head, Corresponding Secretary Philip Van Patten. Two individuals filled the role on a temporary basis for the rest of the year, culminating in the party's 4th National Convention in December 1883. There the 16 delegates, in an effort to forge links with non-party revolutionary socialists in an effort to keep them out of the camp of the rival anarchist movement, decided to steer the organization on a leftward course, curtaining the authority of the governing National Executive Committee and abolishing the centralizing post of Corresponding Secretary altogether in an effort to render the SLP a more decentralized organization amenable to the revolutionary left.

=== Head of the Socialist Labor Party ===
This effort at structural change did little to cure the SLP's fundamental malaise, with the flight of its English-speaking element nearly complete and the organization operating without an English-language official organ of any sort. The party's recuperation was assisted by a downturn of the economy in 1883, however, with widespread unemployment providing an impetus to membership for many, as the SLP tripling in size and doubling the number of its Sections over the next two years. Growth of the SLP made another official national newspaper possible. In January 1885, Wilhelm Rosenberg, who had previously assisted Joseph Dietzgen with the editorial task at the Chicagoer Arbeiter-Zeitung (Chicago Workers' News), moved to New York City to help Deitzgen launch a new German-language official organ for the SLP, Der Sozialist (The Socialist).

Determining the decentralized organizational structure to be impractical, the SLP restored its chief executive office in March 1884, with Section New York electing Rosenberg to the role "Secretary of the National Executive Committee" and calling the 5th National Convention of the SLP to order in Cincinnati in October 1885 in that capacity.

Rosenberg married his wife, Maria, in 1885. The couple had two daughters, Percivale (born circa 1886) and Elsa (born circa 1887).

As the Socialist Labor Party posted membership gains in the second half of the 1880s, its members began to diverge on the question of political tactics. Some, including the newly established English-language party weekly, The Workmen's Advocate, as well as Rosenberg's Der Sozialist, favored an emphasis on electoral politics, including the establishment of alliances with the "progressive" or "radical" labor parties which were emerging in many localities in this period. Others, following the lead of the influential daily New Yorker Volkszeitung (New York People's News), declared socialist politics to be premature and urged that the SLP confine its efforts to extending its influence in the trade union movement. The debate between these two camps grew steadily more heated and personal through 1888 and into 1889, with the Volkszeitung characterizing Rosenberg and the NEC as an incompetent clique.

Finally in September 1889, with the party's biannual National Convention on the horizon, the bad blood erupted into an outright split. The membership of SLP Section New York, by virtue of their position as the Section of the headquarters city, attempted to exercise their right to recall Rosenberg and three other members of the party's National Executive Committee, replacing them with Sergei Shevitch and three others favoring more of a trade unionist orientation. Rosenberg and his compatriots refused to yield, however, instead continuing to assert their right to function as the National Executive Committee of the whole party and calling a party convention to be held in Chicago to begin on October 2. The new NEC named by Section New York began to function as well, issuing a call for a party convention of their own.

At this point the various Sections of the SLP were about evenly split between the pro-electoral Rosenberg NEC and the trade union-oriented Volkszeitung NEC. In a last-ditch attempt to prevent a split the SLP's Control Committee, based in Philadelphia, intervened in the conflict by suspending both of the rival NECs from office and moving the date of the 7th Convention to October 12. The Volkszeitung group accepted this decision; Rosenberg and the deposed NEC did not. On October 2, 1889, the Rosenberg faction opened their convention in Chicago, with the Volkszeitung faction opening their gathering in the same city 10 days later.

=== Years after the SLP ===
While neither of the two rival conventions of the SLP were well attended, by failing to adhere to the directives of the Philadelphia party Control Committee, Rosenberg and his comrades essentially put themselves out of the Socialist Labor Party, which moved forward. They continued an independent organizational existence for the next decade as the Social Democratic Federation (SDF). This party's headquarters located variously located in Cincinnati, Baltimore, Buffalo, Cincinnati again, Chicago, and finally Cleveland. The frequent changes of locale caused wags remaining in the SLP to refer to the Rosenberg SDF as "the traveling faction" or "the party on wheels."

Following the party split, the official organ of Rosenberg's organization was the Volks-Anwalt (People's Advocate), a weekly paper which launched in Cincinnati on October 25, 1889.

There was subsequently some effort towards unity of the two factions, with Thomas J. Morgan put forward for Mayor of Chicago in 1891 as the joint nominee of the official SLP and the Rosenberg organization. Unity discussions came to nothing in 1892, however.

In 1895, Rosenberg moved to Cincinnati, Ohio where he became editor of the Cincinnati Tageblatt (Daily News), another socialist newspaper. The Social Democratic Federation merged with the Social Democracy of America, early forerunner of the Socialist Party of America in August 1897, bringing with it its German-language newspaper, the Volks-Anwalt, which continued to be produced until August 1898.

Rosenberg remained in Cleveland, editing a German-language paper there called Echo in 1911 and into 1912. He worked as a school teacher in Cleveland until his retirement, living with a married daughter in Rocky River, Ohio in his final years.

Rosenberg was a prolific author of poetry, plays, songs, and short stories and remained a contributor to the socialist press until his death sometime in the 1930s.

== Works ==
- Lieder und Gedichte. (Songs and Poems) Frankfurt am Main: Morgenstern, 1880.
- Vor der Wahlschlacht: Lustspiel in 1 Akt. (Before the election battle: Comedy in one act) New York: John Oehler, 1887. —signed as "W.L.R."
- Aus dem Reiche des Tantalus: Alfresco-Skizzen. (From the realm of Tantalus: Alfresco sketches) Zürich: Verlag Magazin, 1888.
- An der Weltenwende: Gedichte. (To Turn the World: Poems) Cleveland: Windsor Avenue Publishing Co., 1910.
- Liebesglück und Liebesleid: Lyrische gedichte. (Love, happiness and suffering love: Lyrical poems) Cleveland: Windsor Avenue Publishing Co., 1916.
- Die Macht des Aberglaubens: Lustspiel in einem Auszuge. (The power of superstition: A comedy in one act) Cleveland: Windsor Avenue Publishing Co., n.d. [1910s].

== See also ==
- Socialist Labor Party of America
- Social Democratic Federation (U.S., 1889)
