= Rudolf Katz =

German politician and judge (1895–1961)

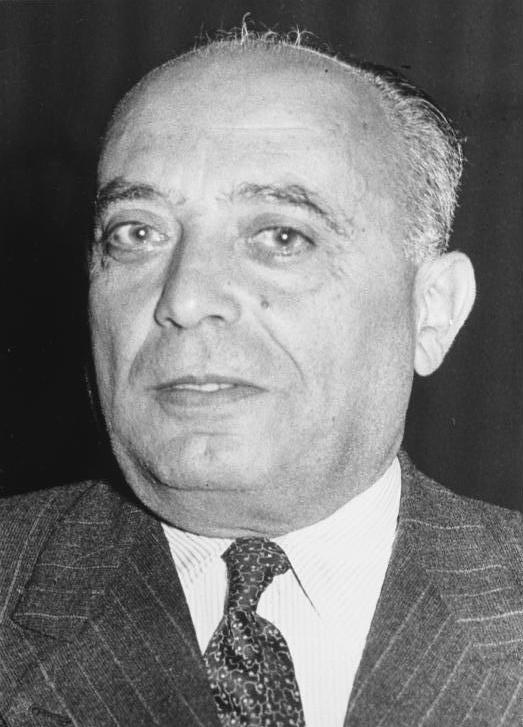

Minister of Justice of Schleswig-Holstein
- In office 1947–1950
- Preceded by: Gottfried Kuhnt
- Succeeded by: Otto Wittenburg

Minister of Education of Schleswig-Holstein
- In office 1948–1949

Member of the Landtag of Schleswig-Holstein
- In office 1950–1951

1st Vice-president of the Federal Constitutional Court of Germany
- In office 7 September 1951 – 23 July 1961
- Preceded by: none
- Succeeded by: Friedrich Wilhelm Wagner

Personal details
- Born: 23 November 1895 Falkenburg, Province of Pomerania, German Empire
- Died: 23 July 1961 (aged 65) Baden-Baden, Germany
- Party: SPD
- Occupation: lawyer

Rudolf Katz (23 November 1895 – 23 July 1961) was a German politician and judge. He was Vice President of the Federal Constitutional Court of Germany.

== Biography ==
Katz was born in Falkenburg, Farther Pomerania (modern Złocieniec, Poland), to Leopold Katz, a teacher and Jewish Kantor, and Hulda Katz. The family moved to Kiel in 1897, where Katz grew up. He began to study law at the University of Kiel in 1913, but volunteered for the German Army in World War I. Katz served as a Lieutenant and was wounded several times, he finished his studies in 1919 and gained his doctorate in 1920.

Katz joined the Social Democratic Party of Germany in 1920 and the Reichsbanner Schwarz-Rot-Gold in 1924. Katz was elected a member of the city council of Altona in 1929 and became its chairman in 1932. He worked as a lawyer (1924–1933) and notary (1929–1933) in Altona. In 1930, he left the Jewish Parish. Katz pleaded for communist defendants in the aftermath of the Altona Bloody Sunday of July 1932.

After Hitler took over power in Germany Katz fled to France in March 1933. Along with Max Brauer, a Social Democrat and mayor of Altona, Katz became an envoy for municipal administration of the League of Nations in Nanjing in October 1933. In 1935 he moved to the United States and worked at the Columbia University's Institute for Public Administration and as a journalist for the Neue Volkszeitung, a German-language newspaper of Social Democrat emigrants. Katz was a director of the Rand School of Social Science in New York and of The New Leader newspaper, he was active in the German Labour Delegation, part of the American Federation of Labor, and the "German-American Council for the Liberation of Germany from Nazism".

After Katz had lost his German citizenship because of the racialist Nazi laws, he became a United States citizen in 1941.

In July 1946 Katz returned to Germany along with Max Brauer and became Minister of Justice (1947–50) and Education (1948–49) in the State of Schleswig-Holstein. He regained his German citizenship in November 1947 and represented Schleswig-Holstein in the Parlamentarischer Rat, ("Parliamentary Council"), the predecessor of the West German Bundestag. In the negotiations of the German constitution Katz successfully proposed the invention of the Constructive vote of no confidence, while his suggestion to limit the number of members of the Bundestag to 300 and to implement a minimum threshold of 10 percent of votes failed.

In 1951 Katz became the Chairman of the second Senate and Vice President of the Federal Constitutional Court of Germany. He was elected a member of the executive board of the International Commission of Jurists at the New Delhi Congress in 1959.

Katz was married to Agnes Kühl in 1933. He died in Baden-Baden.
