= Sergei Shevitch =

Russian newspaper editor and socialist political activist

Sergei Shevitch, socialist newspaper editor and political activist.

Sergei Egorovich Shevitch (spelled variously, c. 1847–1911) (Russian: Сергей Егорович Шевич) was a Russian newspaper editor and socialist political activist who achieved his greatest fame in the United States of America. As editor of the New Yorker Volkszeitung (New York People's News) from 1879 to 1890, Shevitch emerged as arguably the most important leader of the Socialist Labor Party of America. In 1889, Shevitch was the leader of a split of the Socialist Labor Party of America, emerging victorious and serving for a short while as the National Secretary of the organization.

Shevitch and his wife, the former Helene von Racowitza, returned to Russia in 1890 to avoid loss of his estate lands to the crown owing to emigration. Following several years on his estate, Shevitch emigrated again, this time to Germany, where he would die by his own hand in 1911.

== Biography ==
=== Early years ===
Sergei E. Shevitch was born in Russia in approximately 1848. Of noble birth and radical political proclivities, Shevitch attended university in Russia before emigrating to Paris. It was there that he met and married the former Helene von Racowitza, over whom socialist leader Ferdinand Lassalle lost his life in a duel in 1864. The pair emigrated to the United States in 1877.

=== American period ===
Shortly after Shevitch's arrival in America, the socialists of New York launched a daily newspaper, the New Yorker Volkszeitung, and were in search of a professional editor. Shevitch was appointed to this role in which he would remain for more than a decade — this being, it is to be remembered, a time in which about 80% of the organized American socialist movement was German-speaking. Shevitch developed fluency and oratorical skill in English as well, which was demonstrated in his debate against Henry George held at the Cooper Union.

As editor of the Volkszeitung, Shevitch took the position that the participation of the tiny Socialist Labor Party of America (SLP) in electoral politics was premature and that effort should instead be spent on the building of the trade union movement. This brought Shevitch and the privately owned Volkszeitung into conflict with the leadership of the SLP, which advanced its views through a pair of publications, the English-language Workmen's Advocate and the German Der Sozialist. The disagreement festered with the party leadership charging the Volkszeitung with disloyalty and the Volkszeitung countering with accusations of official incompetence.

Matters came to a head in September 1889 when the majority of SLP Section New York came down on the side of the Volkszeitung, recalling pro-political action national secretary Wilhelm Rosenberg and the members of the party's governing NEC. Shevitch was selected to replace Rosenberg as head of the SLP. A party crisis ensued, with the deposed leadership refusing to stand down and the Sections of the SLP lining up in approximately even numbers between the parallel pro-trade union Shevitch and pro-political action Rosenberg factions. The party's Control Committee was forced to intervene, temporarily suspending both leaderships and moving back the scheduled 7th National Convention of the SLP from October 2, 1889 to October 12.

Ultimately the Rosenberg faction refused to accept this decision of the SLP Control Committee, based in Philadelphia, and rival conventions were held. This group was ultimately excluded from the party and the Rosenberg wing established itself as a new group called the Social Democratic Federation. The Shevitch-led faction, which also included such prominent New York leaders as Lucien Sanial and Alexander Jonas, assumed the mantle of the official Socialist Labor Party of America. A period of organizational growth followed.

=== Return to Russia ===
In 1890 Shevitch and his wife returned to Russia, their decision forced by rules that would have ceded the substantial landed estate which Shevitch had inherited to the crown in the case of protracted absence from the country. The pair lived on the estate for several years before successfully selling it.

=== German period ===
Thereafter the couple moved to Munich. Shevitch was prohibited from political participation by the German government owing to his radical views and he lived out the rest of his live in relative quiet, where he waited his time for a constitutional order to be established in his native Russia.

== Works ==
- "Russian Novels and Novelists of the Day". North American Review. 128 (268): 326–334. March 1879. JSTOR 25100736.
- Coauthored with Luigi Donato Ventura: Misfits and Remnants. Boston: Ticknor and Co. 1886.
- Elena Prawdin. Drama in fünf Aufzügen [Elena Prawdin. A drama in five acts] (in German). Berlin: Felix Bloch Erben. 1896. (published under the pseudonym Serge Lensky).
- Ein Krieg auf Actien – für Actien. Der Burenkrieg als sociales Symptom unserer modernen Kultur; Vortrag gehalten und gedruckt zum Besten der „Deutschen Centrale für Bestrebungen zur Beendigung des Burenkrieges“ in München [A War by Shares – for Shares. The Boer War as a Social Symptom of Our Modern Culture; a Lecture Delivered and Published for the Benefit of the “German Center for Efforts To End the Boer War” in Munich] (in German). Munich: August Schupp. 1901.
