= Richard Realf =

American poet

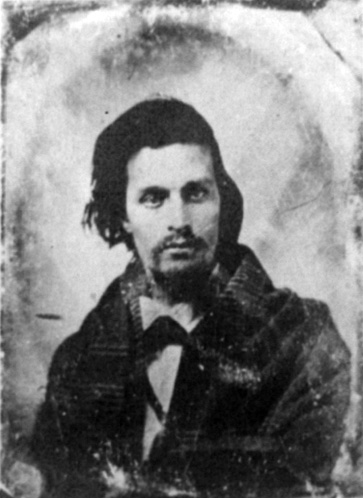
Richard Realf

Richard Realf (14 June 1832, Framfield, East Sussex, England – 28 October 1878, Oakland, California) was a poet who lived in many places throughout the United States, and whose work was informed by these travels. An obituary called him "a singularly unhappy man".

== Early success ==
At the age of fifteen he began to write verses, and two years later he became amanuensis to a lady in Brighton. A traveling lecturer on phrenology recited some of young Realf's poems, as illustrations of ideality. Thereupon several literary people in Brighton sought him out and encouraged him, particularly Lady Byron, widow of the poet. Under their patronage a collection of his poems was published, entitled "Guesses at the Beautiful" (London, 1852). Realf spent a year in Leicestershire, studying scientific agriculture with a relative of Lady Byron, Charles Noel and in 1854 came to the United States after a doomed love affair with Noel's young daughter Alice. Upon this being discovered Lady Byron arranged for Realf to go to America and given a teaching post at a school, Five Points Mission.

== Life in the U.S. ==
After arriving in the U.S., Realf explored the slums of New York City, became a Five Points missionary, and assisted in establishing there a course of cheap lectures and a self-improvement association. In 1856 he accompanied a party of free-state emigrants to Kansas, where he became a journalist and correspondent of several Eastern newspapers. He made the acquaintance of John Brown, accompanied him to Chatham, Ontario, Canada, and was to be Secretary of State in the provisional government that Brown projected. The movement being deferred for two years, Realf made a visit to England and a tour in the Southern states. When Brown made his attack on Harpers Ferry in October 1859, Realf was in Texas, where he was arrested and sent to Washington, D.C., being in imminent danger of lynching on the way.

Early in 1862 he enlisted in the 88th Illinois Volunteer Infantry Regiment, with which he served through the American Civil War. Some of his best lyrics were written in the field, and were widely circulated. After the war he was commissioned in the United States Colored Troops, whose officers were all white, and in 1866 was mustered out with the rank of Captain and Brevet Lieutenant-Colonel. In June 1865 he had married Sophia Emery Realf, née Graves, at Valparaiso, Indiana.

In 1868 he established a school for freedmen in South Carolina, and a year later was made assessor of internal revenue for Edgefield district. He resigned this office in 1870, returned to the North and became a journalist and lecturer, residing in Pittsburgh, Pennsylvania. He was an editorial writer for the Pittsburgh Commercial newspaper from 1870 to 1876. In 1873, he delivered a poem before the Society of the Army of the Cumberland and in 1874 wrote one for the Society of the Army of the Potomac. He was a described as a brilliant talker and a fine orator. Among his lectures were "Battle-Flashes" and "The Unwritten Story of the Martyr of Harpers Ferry". His most admired poems are "My Slain", "An Old Man's Idyll", "Indirection", and the verses that he wrote just before he took the poison that ended his life.

== Suicide ==
After a failed attempt the previous evening, Realf killed himself by taking chloral hydrate and laudanum at the Windsor House in Oakland, California, on October 28, 1878. He committed suicide in consequence of an unfortunate marriage and an imperfect divorce. He appointed as his literary executor Colonel Richard J. Hinton, who, after an initial gathering of the poet's scattered fragments performed by Ina Coolbrith, completed the collection of Realf's poems for publication, together with a biographical sketch, in 1888. Realf is buried in Section OSA, Row 72, Grave #4 of the San Francisco National Cemetery located in the Presidio of San Francisco, California.
