= Gerhart Seger =

German politician (1896–1967)

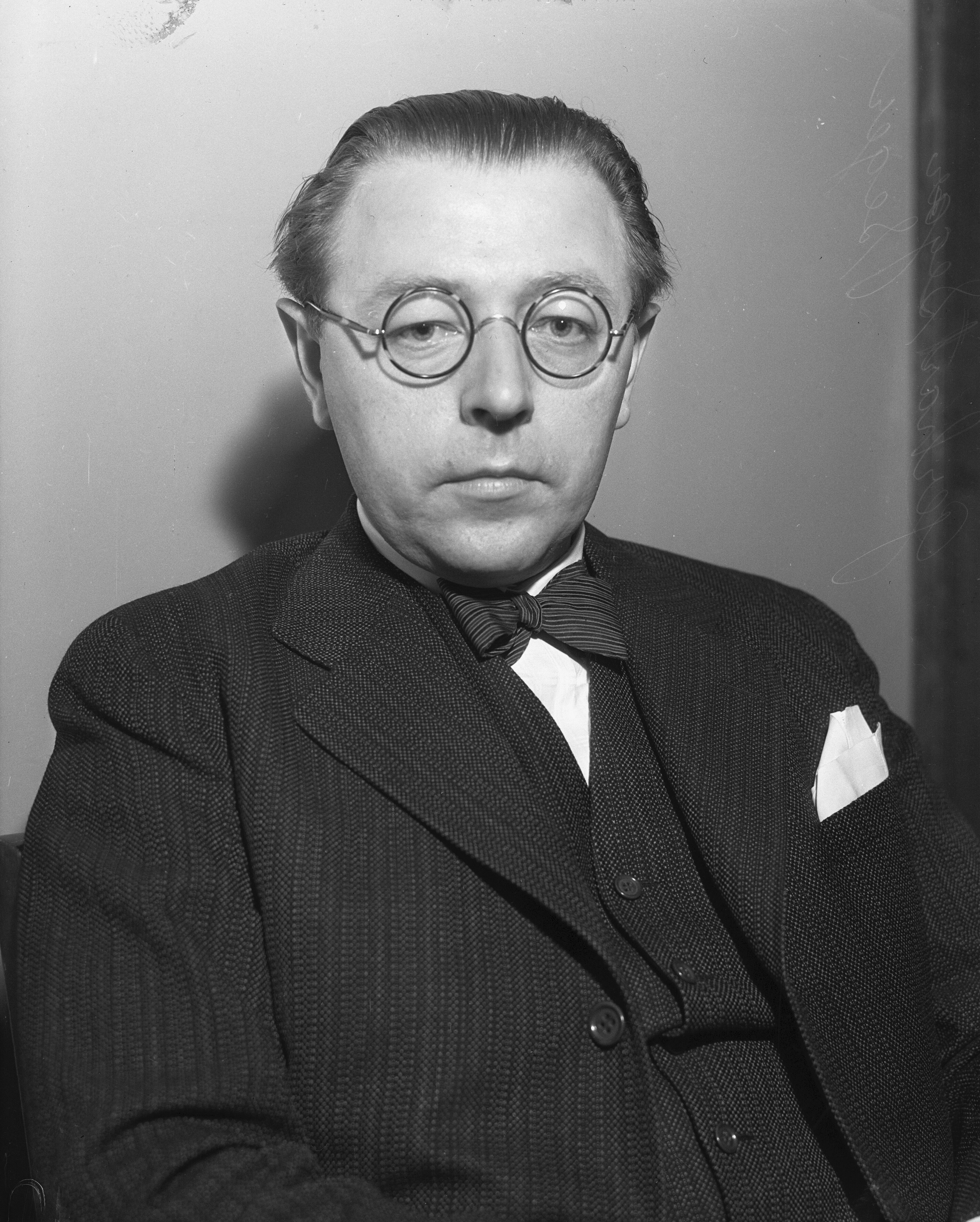
- Seger in 1935

Member of the Reichstag for Magdeburg
- In office 13 October 1930 – 12 March 1933
- Preceded by: Multi-member district
- Succeeded by: Constituency abolished

Personal details
- Born: 16 November 1896 Leipzig, Kingdom of Saxony, German Empire
- Died: 21 January 1967 (aged 70) New York City, U.S.
- Party: SPD (before 1917, after 1922); USPD (1917–1922)
- Spouse: Elisabeth
- Children: Renate
- Occupation: Newspaper publisher, politician

Gerhart Seger (16 November 1896 – 21 January 1967) was a German social democratic newspaper publisher, politician and pacifist. From October 1930 to March 1933 he was a member of the Reichstag. Due to the rejection of the Enabling Act by the Social Democrats, he was among those Reichstag deputies who were persecuted by the Nazis, arrested and sent to concentration camps. In 1934 he fled to Prague, where he wrote a sensational account of his experiences in the Oranienburg concentration camp. Shortly afterwards he emigrated to the United States, where he became politically active and known as a lecturer.

== Biography ==
Seger came from a family of tailors and learned the lithography trade in Leipzig. He was the son of the longtime Leipzig SPD functionary and Reichstag member Friedrich Seger and Hedwig Winkler. In his youth he joined the Socialist Workers' Youth. During the First World War he was a soldier. In 1917 he joined the USPD. In 1919 Seger did an internship at the University of Leipzig in the subjects of journalism and art history. In 1920 and 1921 he worked as a lecturer at the adult education center in Kiel and in 1921 he became editor of the USPD newspaper Die Freiheit in Berlin.

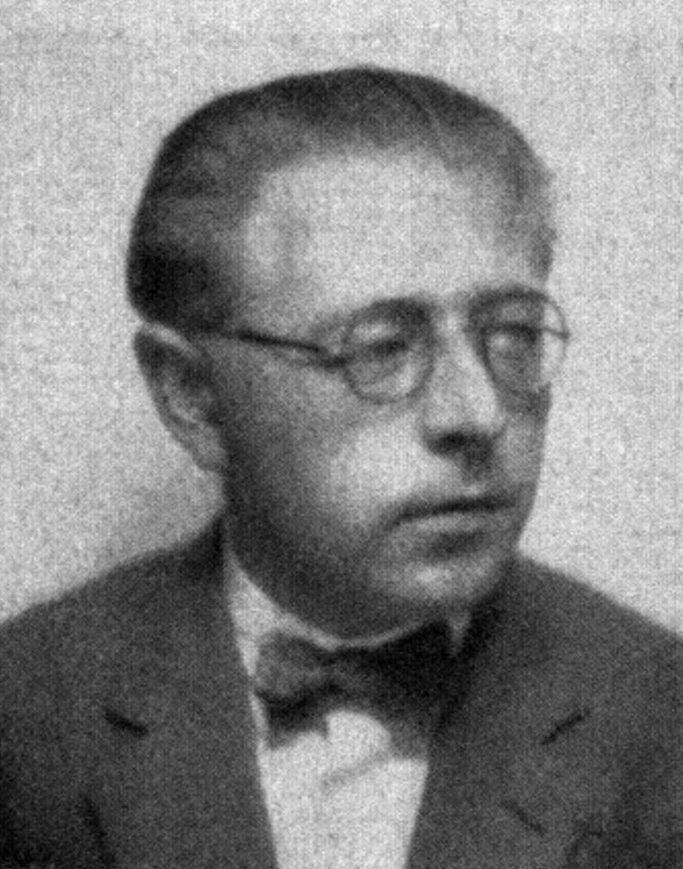
Seger's official Reichstag portrait, 1930

After the unification of the USPD and MSPD in 1922, Seger rejoined the SPD and became editor of the Volkszeitung für Südwestsachsen in Plauen. A year later, he gave up this position for a full-time position as General Secretary of the German Peace Society. In 1928, he became editor of the Volksblattes für Anhalt in Dessau until he was elected to the Reichstag for constituency 10 (Magdeburg) in 1930.

After Adolf Hitler came to power and passed the Enabling Act in March 1933, Seger was one of the first Reichstag deputies to be taken into "protective custody" by the Nazis. Initially he was held in the court prison in Dessau before being transferred to the Oranienburg concentration camp with other political prisoners on June 14, 1933. He was one of the few to escape in December 1933. In exile in Prague, he wrote his Oranienburg Report. With a foreword by Heinrich Mann, the report on the beginning of the Nazi era attracted international attention. In retaliation, the Gestapo took Seger's wife and young daughter hostage in early 1934. Only protests from abroad led to the family's release from prison and enabled them to leave the country.

Seger and his family emigrated to the United States in October 1934. There he helped found the German Labour Delegation. He worked as an editor for their New York-based newspaper Neue Volkszeitung. He also wrote for other German-language newspapers and gave lectures on the Nazi regime. On November 3, 1934, the Deutscher Reichsanzeiger published the third expatriation list of the German Reich, through which he was denaturalized.

Seger served as an advisor to the American government and remained in America after the war, working as a freelance journalist from 1950 onwards. He became known primarily through his lectures; in the U.S. alone he gave more than 11,000 lectures.

Seger died of cancer in his home in Ozone Park, Queens on January 21, 1967.

== Awards ==
- 1960: Order of Merit of the Federal Republic of Germany

== Works ==
- Art and historical materialism. An example of a new approach to art. Leipzig, 1920.
- Proletarian youth and theater. A guide for working youth by Gerhart Seger. Berlin, 1921.
- The intellectual liberation of the working class. Remarks on the educational work of Gerhart Seger. Leipzig, 1922.
- The Workshop of the Mind. Berlin, 1922.
- What is historical materialism? An attempt at a systematic presentation. Berlin, 1923.
- Workers and Pacifism. Leipzig, 1924.
- (Ed.): The Quidde Case. Facts and Documents. Compiled and introduced by Gerhart Seger, Secretary of the German Peace Society. Berlin, 1924.
- Workers/War/League of Nations. Hamburg, 1925.
- Defensive Republic? Berlin, 1926.
- Germany – a second Switzerland? Neutralization as war prevention. A foreign policy proposal by Gerhart Seger. Dessau, 1929.
- Oranienburg: First authentic report from an escapee from the concentration camp. With a foreword by Heinrich Mann. Karlsbad, 1934.
- A Nation Terrorized. With a Foreword by Heinrich Mann. Chicago: Reilly & Lee Co., 1935.
- Travel diary of a German emigrant. Zurich, Europa-Verlag, 1936.
- With Siegfried K. Marck: To be or not to be? New York, 1943.
- Life in Germany. Grand Rapids, 1955.
- Dictatorship - War -Disaster. New York, 1956.
- USA. Munich, n.d.
- Come along to Germany. Minneapolis, 1966.
