= Richard J. Hinton =

Richard Josiah Hinton (November 26, 1830 – December 20, 1901) was a journalist, author, abolitionist, and military officer with the rank of colonel. He was the commander of African-American soldiers in the American Civil War, Freedmens Bureau official, and U.S. government official.

== Biography ==
Born in England, he came to the United States in 1851, and became an important witness to events leading to the Civil War and its aftermath. He was an abolitionist who moved to Kansas in 1856 to help stop the spread of slavery. During the Civil War he helped recruit units of the new United States Colored Troops, and served as an officer of one (all the officers were white). He wrote about Abraham Lincoln, John Brown, and poet Richard Realf.

He reported from Haiti for James Redpath's Pine and Palm newspaper. He served as an officer with the 1st Kansas Colored Infantry Regiment in 1862 and then as captain of Company B, 2nd Kansas Colored Infantry Regiment. (All the "colored" regiments had white officers.) He subsequently served in various federal government positions: United States Commissioner of Emigration in Europe in 1867; inspector of U.S. consulates in Europe; special agent to President Ulysses S. Grant to Vienna in 1873; special agent to the Departments of Treasury and State on the frontier and in Mexico in 1883; irrigation engineer to the U.S. Geological Survey from 1889-1890; and special agent in charge of the U.S. Department of Agriculture from 1890 to 1892. In 1900 he wrote "I am glad also I was able to do other work, both as writer and fighter, in a small way, and, among Kansas soldiers, and many others by far more important than myself, to make the union secure and the whole of the state free from the curse of chattelism."

In 1897 he played a prominent role in a new political movement, Social Democracy of America. The founding convention of the Social Democracy of America established a three member “Colonization Commission” consisting of Richard J. Hinton, and two journalists, Cyrus Field Willard and socialist propagandist W.P. Borland of Bay City, Michigan. Hinton, Willard and Borland helped lead an affiliated initiative, the Brotherhood of the Cooperative Commonwealth, whose goal was to concentrate progressive thinkers in one state. They chose Washington State as the most suitable for the purpose. The Equality Colony was founded as part of this initiative.

When he died in 1901, he was survived by his wife Isabella H. Hinton, and two sons, George F. and Ralph Hinton. The Kansas Historical Society has a collection of his papers.

== Publications (chronologically) ==
- ''The Life and Public Services of Hon. Abraham Lincoln, of Illinois, and Hon. Hannibal Hamlin, of Maine (with Lincoln's speeches)'. Boston: Thayer and Eldridge. 1860.
- Rebel invasion of Missouri and Kansas, and the campaign of the army of the border against General Sterling Price, in October and November, 1864 (2nd ed.). Chicago: Church & Goodman. 1865.
- English radical leaders. New York: G.P. Putnam's Sons. 1877.
- The Hand-book to Arizona : Its Resources, History, Towns, Mines, Ruins and Scenery. San Francisco: Payot, Upham & Co. 1878.
- (With Frank A. Burr) "Little Phil" and his troopers : the life of Gen. Philip H. Sheridan : its romance and reality, how an humble lad reached the head of an army. Providence, Rhode Island: J.A. & R.A. Reid. 1888.
- Irrigation in the United States (2nd ed.). Washington D.C.: Government Printing Office. 1890.
- A report on irrigation and the cultivation of the soil thereby, with physical data, conditions, and progress within the United States for 1891, accompanied by maps, illustrations, and papers. Vol. 1. Washington, D.C.: U. S. Senate (Government Printing Office). 1892.
- John Brown and his men; with some account of the roads they traveled to reach Harper's Ferry. New York and London: Funk & Wagnalls Company. 1894. In 1899 he published a summary.
- Poems by Richard Realf, poet, soldier, workman : With a memoir by Richard J. Hinton. New York: Funk & Wagnalls. 1898.
- Richard Realf's Free-state Poems : with personal lyrics written in Kansas. Edited, with historical notes, by Col. RIchard J. Hinton. Topeka, Kansas: Crane & Company. 1900. Contains a 14-page introduction on Hinton, by William E. Connelley.
