= Johanna Greie =

German-American socialist (1864-1911)

- Born: Johanna Greie; January 6, 1864; Dresden, Germany
- Died: October 1911 (aged 47)
- Occupation(s): Writer, lecturer
- Spouse: Emile Greie

Johanna Greie (1864–1911), also known as Johanna Greie-Cramer, was a German-American writer, socialist, and reformer.

== Biography ==
Born in Dresden on January 6, 1864 to middle-class parents, her formal education ended after primary school. She met and married Emile Greie, a lathe-turner devoted to the free-thought and Social Democratic movements.

A friend of her husband's, the writer Karl Schneidt, discovered her literary ability and urged her to write for his paper, the Neue Magdeburger Tageblatt, where she worked for some years.

Forced to leave Germany as a result of the political convictions of her husband, whose views she shared, the couple moved to America in 1887. She "flowered virtually overnight into a leading Socialist writer and lecturer", becoming an editorialist in Der Sozialist, the party's weekly national newspaper; her major essay on the subject, "Is It Necessary For Women to Organize Themselves?," was published in early 1888 there and soon reprinted as the first major political treatise on women's organization from within the German-American Socialist movement. She wrote for the Chicagoer Arbeiter-Zeitung and started a women's page in the New Yorker Volkszeitung, making it her explicit aim to familiarize women with socialist class theory. In 1889 she was elected to the Committee on Credentials of the Socialist Labor Party of America.

Her biography is sketched out in the New Yorker Volkszeitung, Feb 26, 1911.

== Legacy ==
During her lecture circuit on the subject of the Haymarket affair, Greie met Emma Goldman, who was deeply affected by her lecture in Rochester and went on to become a notable anarchist and political activist. Goldman wrote on meeting Greie in her autobiography.

As I turned towards them, I saw Greie motioning to me. I was startled, my heart beat violently, and my feet felt leaden. When I approached her, she took me by the hand and said: "I never saw a face that reflected such a tumult of emotions as yours. You must be feeling the impending tragedy intensely. Do you know the men?" In a trembling voice I replied: "Unfortunately not, but I do feel the case with every fibre, and when I heard you speak, it seemed to me as if I knew them." She put her hand on my shoulder. "I have a feeling that you will know them better as you learn their ideal, and that you will make their cause your own."

— Emma Goldman, Living My Life (1970)

== Bibliography ==
- Is It Necessary For Women to Organize Themselves?
- The Woman and the Labor Press
