= Isaac Hourwich =

Jewish-American economist and statistician

Isaac Hourwich, American economist and labor statistician.

Isaac Aronovich Hourwich (Russian: Исаак Аронович Гурвич; April 26, 1860 – July 9, 1924) was a Jewish-American economist, statistician, lawyer, and political activist. Hourwich is best remembered as a pioneer in the development of labor statistics for the American mining industry and as a prominent public intellectual among the Yiddish-language community in the United States.

== Biography ==
=== Early years ===
Isaac Aronovich Hourwich was born April 26, 1860, in Vilna, Lithuania, then part of the Russian Empire. The Hourwich family was of the middle class, his father Aaron Hourwich was a well-educated employee in a bank who provided a quality secular education to his children.

Hourwich graduated from a classical gymnasium in the Belarusian city of Minsk in 1877. Upon graduation he first tried to study medicine at the St. Petersburg Academy of Medicine and Surgery but did not find that conducive. Thereafter he attended the University of St. Petersburg, where he studied mathematics. It was during this interval that Hourwich first became involved in the Russian revolutionary movement, with his first arrest for revolutionary activity coming in 1879. Hourwich sat in jail in St. Petersburg for an extended period of time before being exiled without trial to Siberia in 1881.

Subsequent events are unclear in the historical record, but it is known that by 1886 he was back in Minsk coordinating a Jewish Workers' Circle there. Hourwich then moved to Yaroslavl where in 1887 he passed the examination at the Demidov Law Institute and was admitted to the Russian bar. During this interlude Hourwich also studied the economy and social relations of the Siberian peasantry and wrote a book on the topic, The Peasant Immigration to Siberia, published in 1888.

Hourwich remained active in the underground revolutionary movement even as a lawyer and was instrumental in establishing radical study circles among Jewish workers.

=== Emigration to America ===
In 1890 Hourwich was forced to flee Russia to avoid arrest, leaving behind his first wife and their four children. On 30 September 1890, he sailed from the Port of Goteborg, Sweden, and arrived at the Port of Hull, England, in the month of October; he next departed from the Port of Liverpool on a ship bound for New York. Hourwich settled in New York City, where he successfully made a return to academia when he was awarded an academic fellowship to attend Columbia College in New York City. Hourwich earned his doctorate from Columbia after successfully defending a pioneering dissertation on the economics of the Russian village. This dissertation was published in book form in 1893 by Columbia College and in Russian translation in Moscow in 1896.

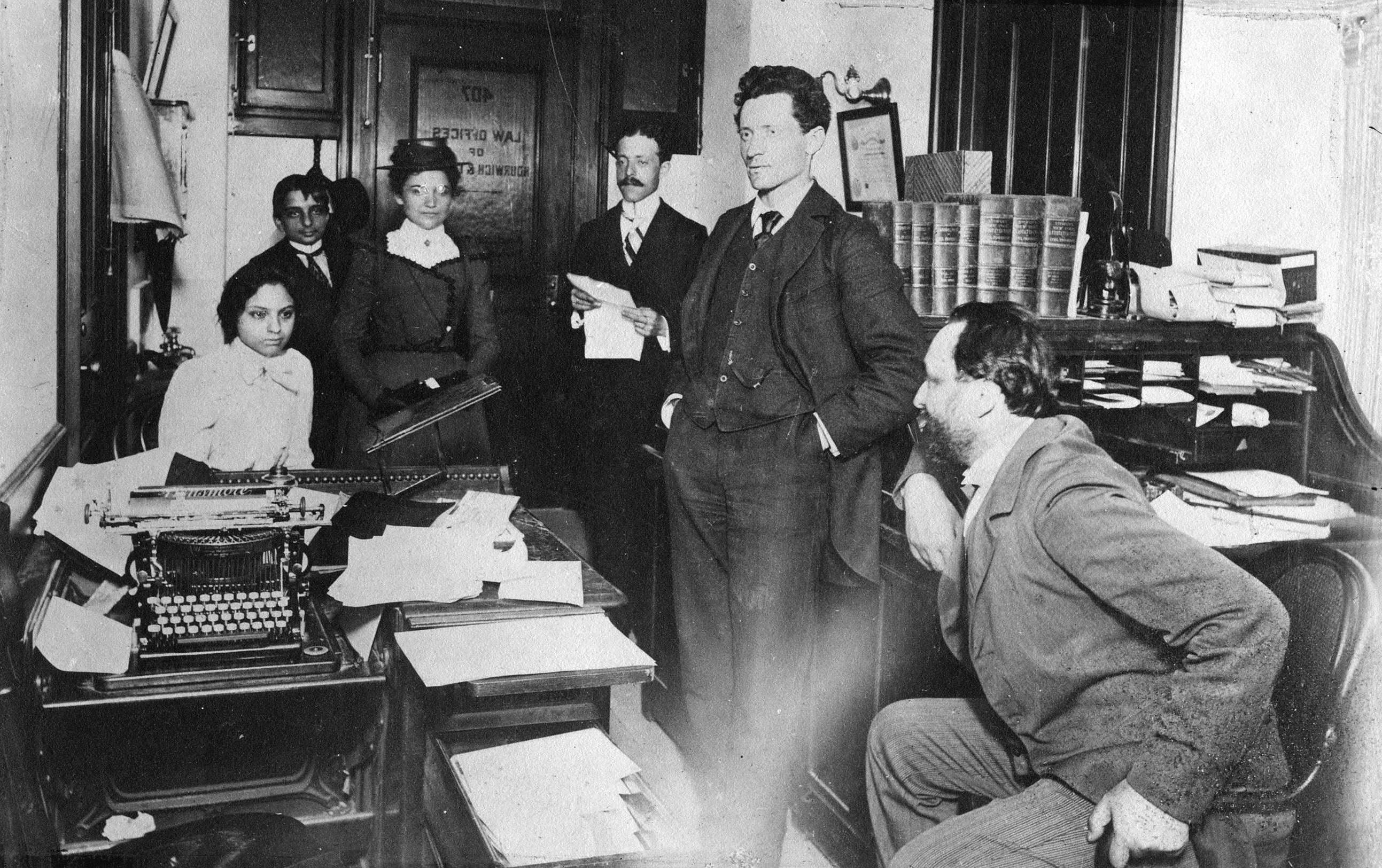
Meyer London (standing, right) and his wife visit Hourwich's law office c. 1893–1900

Settling in Chicago, Hourwich was admitted to the Illinois state bar association in 1893. He also lectured at the University of Chicago for about a year. He contributed a number of articles to academic journals of the day, including the Yale Review, Journal of Political Economy, and Political Science Quarterly.

A committed socialist from his early years, in the United States Hourwich first joined the Socialist Labor Party of America, leaving it in 1897 to join the Social Democratic Party of America (SDP) headed by Eugene V. Debs. In 1901 he declined to follow the SDP into the Socialist Party of America, however, despite the fact that the Chicago-based SDP was one of the main initiators of the new group.

In 1900 Hourwich began a career working in the American government. He was initially employed as a translator at the Bureau of the Mint until 1902, before moving to the Bureau of the Census as a specialist on mining. Hourwich remained with the Census Bureau compiling statistical material relating to American mines and quarries until 1906.

=== Return to Russia ===
In 1905 revolution broke out in Russia. Hourwich made his return across the Atlantic in 1906 to attempt to win election to the Russian State Duma. Somewhat surprisingly, Hourwich did not run for Duma as a Social Democrat, but rather sought office as a member of the centrist Constitutional Democratic Party headed by Pavel Miliukov. Hourwich won the election, only to see the results annulled by the Tsarist government.

=== Second American period ===
Following the annulment of the election and the defeat of the revolution Hourwich returned to America, working once again for the Bureau of the Census in compiling a massive volume on mine statistics in association with the 1910 census.

Back in America, Hourwich continued to stand outside the Socialist movement, supporting the Progressive Party ("Bull Moose") ticket of Theodore Roosevelt in the Presidential election of 1912. In 1913 Hourwich himself became a candidate of the Bull Moose Party, running for an open seat in Congress to fill a vacancy. Although personally respected for his independence, honesty, and intelligence in the Russian colony in America, this alignment with the capitalists proved a bridge too far for the Russian-language Marxists of New York, who accused him of "instability" and of having gone over to the capitalists in the pages of the weekly newspaper Novyi Mir (New World). Moreover, as was the case in his earlier run for the Russian Duma, Hourwich was unsuccessful in his effort to win a seat in Congress.

Hourwich learned to write in Yiddish only at the age of 35. Thereafter he became a prolific writer in that language, writing for a variety of publications under various pseudonyms, including "Isaac Halevy" and "Yitzchok Isaac."

Hourwich joined the Socialist Party of America for the first time during World War I.

In his later years Hourwich became involved in the Zionist movement and in 1917 he was among those who helped to organize the American Jewish Congress. He remained active in the socialist movement as well, publishing a Yiddish translation of Das Kapital by Karl Marx in 1919 and publishing fragments of his uncompleted Yiddish autobiography, Memoirs of a Heretic, in the Socialist The Jewish Daily Forward and the anarchist Fraye Arbeter Shtimme (Free Worker's Voice).

In 1919 Hourwich became involved with the semi-official mission of Soviet Russia in America, the Russian Soviet Government Bureau, as its legal advisor. Hourwich would visit briefly Soviet Russia in 1922 but he was thoroughly disillusioned by the experience, and he emerged as a critic of the tactics of the Bolshevik Party of V.I. Lenin.

=== Death ===
Isaac Hourwich died of pneumonia on July 9, 1924. He was 64 years old at the time of his death.

Hourwich was remembered by his friend, journalist William M. Feigenbaum, as "a man of charm and genuine brilliance" with a tendency to intentionally hold contrarian opinions. "People disagreed with him but he made them think to justify their position," Feigenbaum recalled.

== Legacy ==
Hourwich's son, Nicholas Hourwich was an important member of the Russian Federation of the Socialist Party and a leader of the Left wing section which emerged early in 1919. The younger Hourwich later became a founding member of the Communist Party of America and later emigrated to the Soviet Union.

Isaac Hourwich's papers, available to researchers on 13 reels of microfilm, reside at the Yivo Institute for Jewish Research in New York City.

== Works ==
- The Russian Judiciary," Political Science Quarterly, vol. 7, no. 4 (Dec. 1892), pp. 673-707. In JSTOR.
- The Economics of the Russian Village. Studies in History, Economics, and Public Law, vol. 2, no. 1. New York: University Faculty of Political Science of Columbia College, 1892.
- "Russia in the International Market," Journal of Political Economy, vol. 2, no. 2 (March 1894), pp. 284–290. In JSTOR.
- "The Rate of Profits Under the Law of Labor-Value," Journal of Political Economy, vol. 2, no. 2 (March 1894), pp. 235–250. In JSTOR.
- Trade Unions and the Law. n.c.: n.p., n.d. [1900s].
- "The Jewish Laborer in London," Journal of Political Economy, vol. 13, no. 1 (Dec. 1904), pp. 89–98. In JSTOR.
- "The Social-Economic Classes of the Population of the United States," In two parts. Journal of Political Economy, vol. 19, No. 4 (April 1911), pp. 309–337.
  - In JSTOR: Part I | Part II
- "The Economic Aspects of Immigration," Political Science Quarterly, vol. 26, no. 4 (Dec. 1911), pp. 615–642. In JSTOR.
- Immigration and Labor: The Economic Aspects of European Immigration to the United States. New York: G.P. Putnam's Sons, 1912. Revised Second Edition, New York: B.W. Huebsch, 1922.
- Immigration and Crime. Chicago: n.p., 1912.
- Thirteenth Census of the United States Taken in the Year 1910: Volume XI: Mines and Quarries, 1909: General Report and Analysis. Washington, DC: Government Printing Office, 1913.
- "The Evolution of Commercial Law," American Bar Association Journal, vol. 1, no. 2 (April 1915), pp. 70–76. In JSTOR.
- Oysgevehlṭe shrifṭen (Selected Writings in 4 volumes, In Yiddish). New York: Yitsḥaḳ Ayziḳ Hurviṭsh's Publiḳatsyons Ḳomiṭeṭ, 1917.
  - Vol. 1: Immigration | Vol. 2: The Jewish Question | Vol. 3: Socialism | Vol. 4: Socialism
