= Global Love Day =

Global observance day on 1 May

Global Love Day is a minor observance day celebrated on 1 May around the world. It is celebrated in various countries, but primarily in the United States. A number of American Governors, Mayors, and officials have proclaimed 1 May as "Global Love Day", mostly noted by officials in Florida, Nevada, Maine, Illinois, Wisconsin, Hawaii, Alabama, and Canada.

== History ==
Harold W. Becker, the founder of "The Love Foundation", a United States non profit organization created Global Love Day, which was launched on 1 May 2004. The annual observance was created to encourage unity among people, communities, nations, and to celebrate humanity through unconditional love.

This international event is intended to be a symbolic day of unconditional love.

== Observances ==
=== Events ===
Since 2004, Global Love Day events takes place yearly around the world, including the United States, among the U.S. Hmong Community, England, India, and others. The holiday encourages individuals, groups, and organizations to host gatherings and celebrations according to their unique inspiration, while also being inclusive of other cultures and social considerations.

=== Proclamations ===
As of May 2026, more than 1005 official proclamations have been issued by Governors, Mayors, and Councils from North America and Europe, recognizing 1 May as "Global Love Day". A noteworthy addition in 2019 was a proclamation from the Dalai Lama honoring the day.

=== Popular culture ===
In 1998 writers for The Simpsons created a cynical holiday called Love Day, for the express intent of selling merchandise. This new holiday ultimately leads to the abandonment of Springfield after it is overwhelmed with garbage.

In recent years, Global Love Day has been referenced in popular cultures, social media, newspapers on daily events calendars, blogs and well-known persons such as LeAnn Rimes.
