= German Labour Delegation =

The German Labour Delegation (GLD) was a social-democratic organisation of German emigrants in the United States during the time of Nazi Germany.

The GLD was founded on 10 March 1939 in New York City, with the support of the Jewish Labor Committee, the Social Democratic Federation (United States), and the American Federation of Labour. Its goal was to build contact between the German social-democratic emigrants and the American labor movement. Amongst other things, it was to try to secure financial support in America for the work of Sopade, the exile organization of the Social Democratic Party of Germany (the SPD). The former Prussian Minister of the Interior Albert Grzesinski was elected the first chairman, and Rudolf Katz became the secretary, who would later become a minister in the government of Schleswig-Holstein. Other founding members included the former mayor of Altona Max Brauer, Hedwig Wachenheim, the Austrian Social Democrat Alfred Braunthal, Gerhart Seger (a former member of the Reichstag), and the economist Alfred Kähler. People who later became members of the committee included Friedrich Stampfer, the former editor of Vorwärts, the trade unionist Siegfried Aufhäuser, Erich Rinner and Wilhelm Sollmann. In 1943 Brauer and Aufhäuser took over the chairmanship.

The German Labour Delegation published the Neue Volkszeitung, which was at first a daily, then later a weekly newspaper. The organisation did not have a large membership. Its members were those who in the Weimar Republic had generally belonged to the right wing of the SPD. The organisation was therefore strongly against any cooperation with the Communist Party of Germany, the KPD. However, its effectiveness was also constrained by internal conflicts. Amongst these were the dispute over Grzesinski's work in the Council for a Democratic Germany, which saw itself as a gathering point for all the German emigrants, including members of the KPD. There was also very little success in securing financial donations. The GLD was only able to maintain an office with the support of the Jewish Labor Committee. However, the GLD did manage to contribute to saving several hundred endangered Social Democrats from arrest by the German authorities and getting them out of France in 1940. The GLD also worked on developing plans for the reconstruction of the workers' movement and the introduction of democratic structures in post-Nazi Germany. Due to its small size and its activities in planning, the organization is sometimes seen by scholars as a research institution.

== Founding members ==
- Gerhart Seger escaped from the Oranienburg concentration camp in 1933 and wrote a book about his prison life.
