= Neue Volkszeitung =

German language newspaper

The Neue Volkszeitung (New People's Newspaper) was a German-language newspaper issued from New York City, United States. The paper had a moderate social democratic orientation and is remembered as a leading anti-Nazi American publication in the German language during the years of World War II.

== History ==
Neue Volkszeitung was launched in New York City in December 1932 as the successor of the New Yorker Volkszeitung. The bulk of the paper's readers were inherited from that recently defunct long-running publication. Average circulation in 1934 stood just shy of 22,000 copies per issue.

Initially, the newspaper sought to portray itself as an organ of German-American labor organizations, but gradually it became closely linked to the exile organization of the Social Democratic Party of Germany, serving as that organization's semi-official voice in America. The paper was published by a company known as the Progressive Publishing Association, Inc.

The Neue Volkszeitung pursued a moderate social democratic political line that stood in opposition both to Nazism and Communism. Content included political news from Germany and the United States, coverage of the international labor movement, sports news, a women's section, travel reports, and coverage of theater and the arts.

Neue Volkszeitung continued publication until the first week of August 1949.

== See also ==
- New Yorker Volkszeitung
