= New Yorker Volkszeitung =

Defunct German-language daily newspaper in the United States

New Yorker Volkszeitung was the longest-running German language daily labor newspaper in the United States of America, established in 1878 and suspending publication in October 1932 during the Great Depression. At the time of its demise, the Volkszeitung was one of the oldest radical left newspapers in the nation.

== History ==
=== Background ===
During the 19th century Germans were the second-largest immigrant group to the United States, behind only the ethnic Irish. The wave of German immigration began slowly, averaging about 20,000 people per year during the decades of the 1830s and early 1840s, before exploding after the economic crisis of 1847 and the failure of the Revolution of 1848 in the German states. When the first wave of mass emigration peaked in 1854, some 220,000 Germans left their fatherland for a new home in America.

Immigration centered in a number of major American cities of the East and Midwest, including St. Louis, Chicago, Cincinnati, Milwaukee, Philadelphia, and New York City — urban areas which retained this Germanic influence for many decades, or in some cases, for generations.

A second mass wave of emigration from Germany to America began in 1866, following the conclusion of the American Civil War and running until the economic collapse associated with the Panic of 1873. During this second flurry of departures more than a million more Germans were added to the population of the United States.

=== Termination and legacy ===
The New Yorker Volkszeitung began as a daily in 1878. It was edited by Sergei Shevitch from 1879 to 1890. It was later reorganized by Dr. Siegfried Lipschitz, an American correspondent of the Sozialistischer Pressedienst of Berlin, Germany. He succeeded Ludwig Lore as the newspaper's editor. Afterwards the publication was endorsed by the Socialist Party of the United States and the Social Democratic Party of Germany.

Its publisher was the Socialist Cooperative Publishing Association which had offices at 47 Walker Street in New York City.

The financial crisis of the 1930s prevented members of the Socialist Cooperative Publishing Association from meeting regularly, which made it necessary to shut down printing. Its thirty employees were not released. Two months after the closure of New Yorker Volkszeitung, a new publication, Neue Volkszeitung, was launched as its successor.

== See also ==
- New York Call
- Neue Volkszeitung
- Johanna Greie, wrote a women's section in the newspaper
