= 1932 New York City special mayoral election =

1932 New York City mayoral election
- November 8, 1932
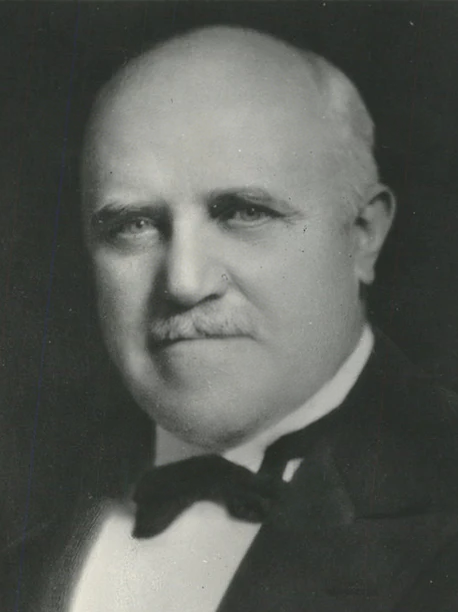

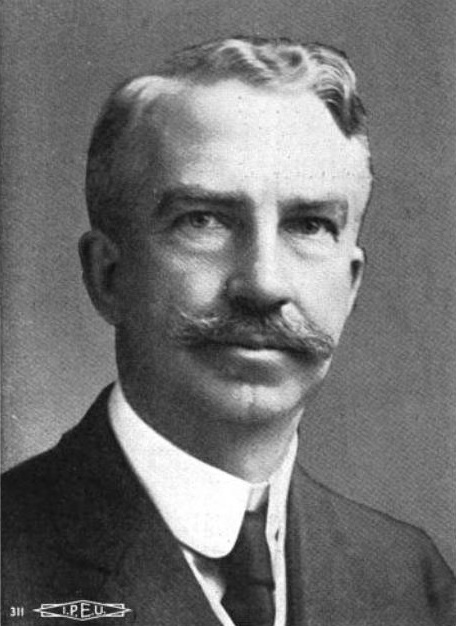

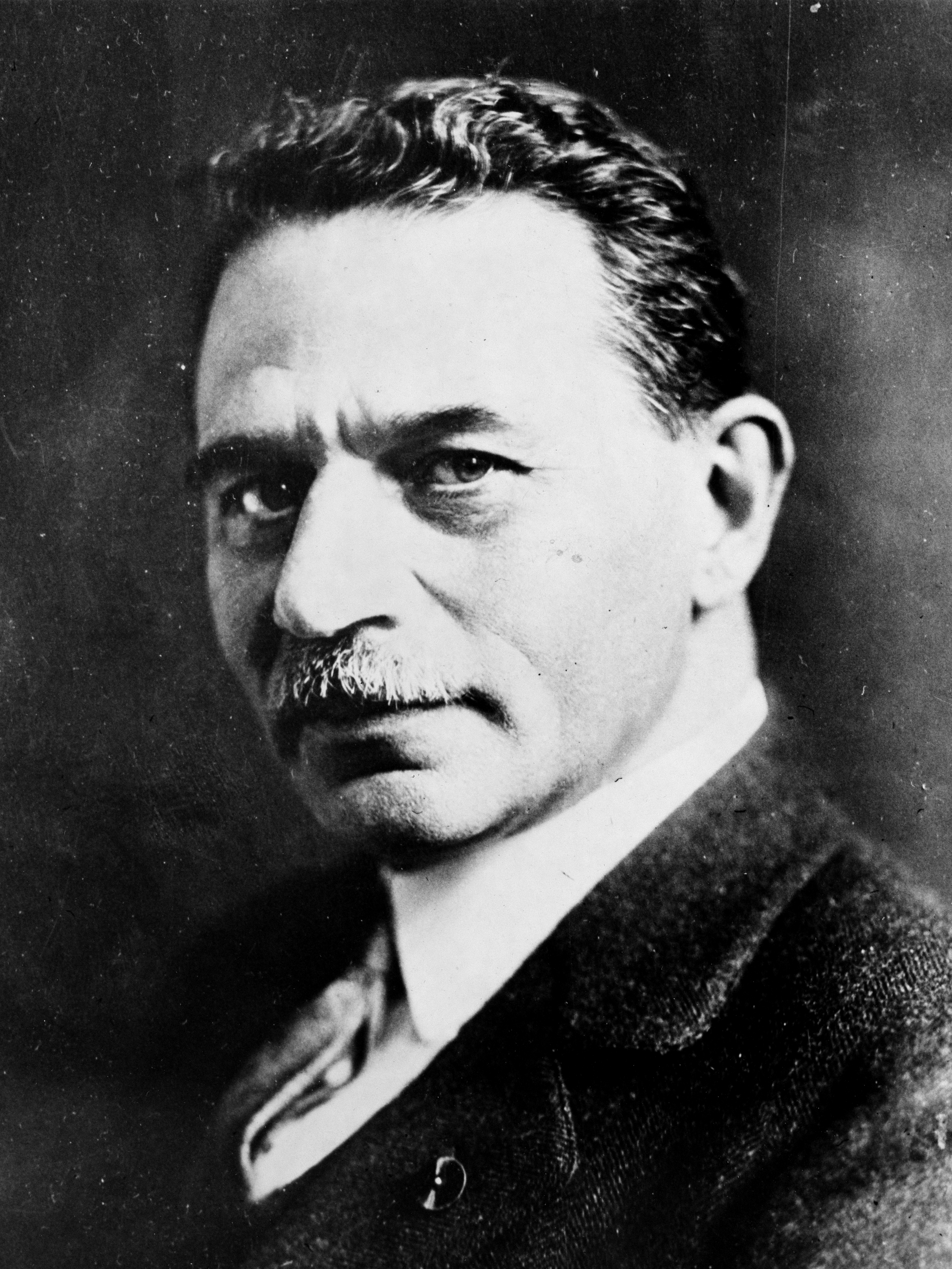

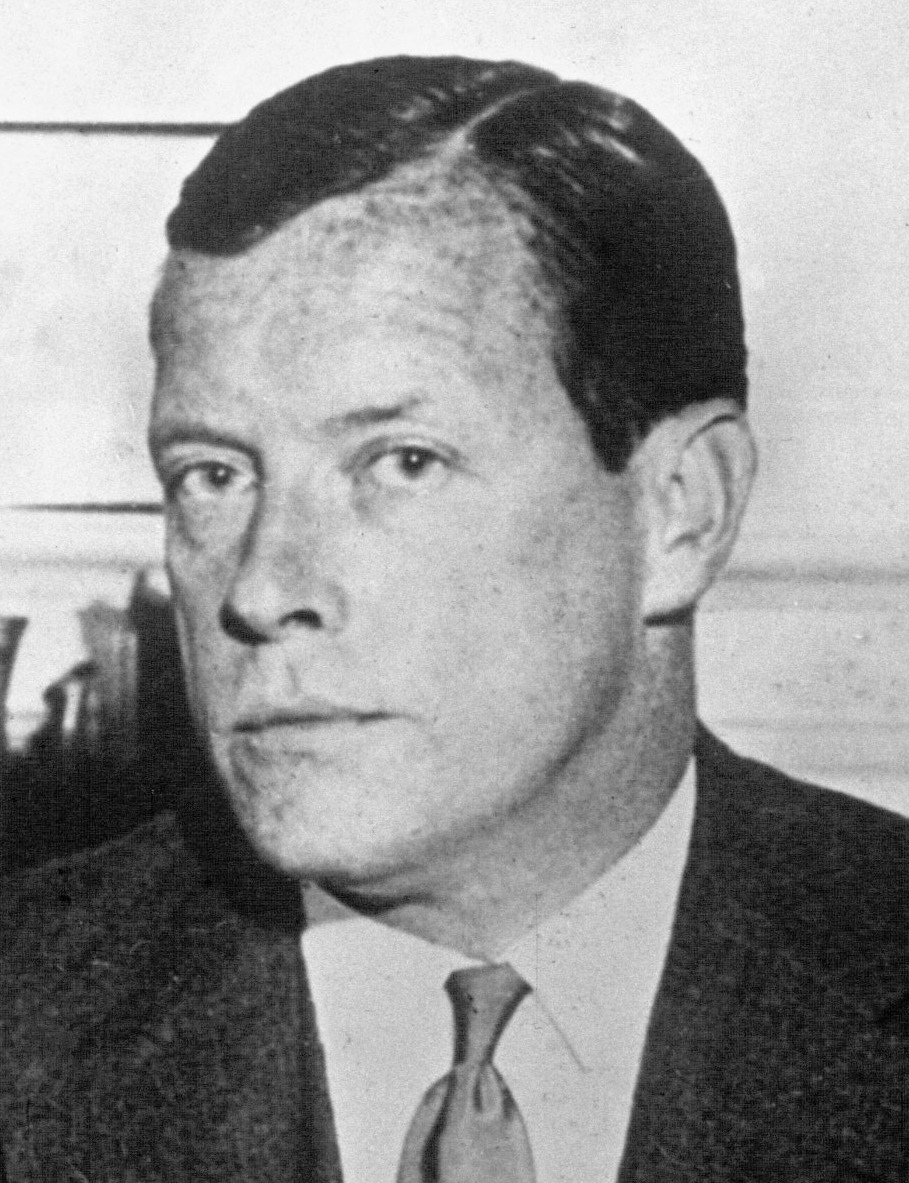
Nominee	John P. O'Brien	Lewis H. Pounds
Party	Democratic	Republican
Popular vote	1,056,115	443,901
Percentage	52.3%	22.0%
Nominee	Morris Hillquit	Joseph V. McKee (write-in)
Party	Socialist	Independent
Popular vote	249,887	234,372
Percentage	12.4%	11.6%
- Borough results O'Brien: 40–50% 50–60% 60–70%
Mayor before election
Joseph V. McKee
Democratic
Elected mayor
John P. O'Brien
Democratic

The 1932 New York City special mayoral election was held on November 8. It was triggered by the resignation of incumbent Democratic Mayor Jimmy Walker on September 1, after his administration had become embroiled in scandal. Democratic nominee John P. O'Brien easily defeated Republican Lewis H. Pounds and Socialist Morris Hillquit. Acting Mayor Joseph V. McKee also featured as a write-in candidate. Minor candidates included Communist William L. Patterson and Socialist Labor candidate Olive Johnson.

== Background ==
Mayor Jimmy Walker, who was supported by Tammany Hall, resigned on September 1, 1932, following investigations into corruption by the Hofstadter Committee under the leadership of Samuel Seabury.

== General election ==
=== Candidates ===
- Morris Hillquit, labor lawyer and nominee for mayor in 1917 (Socialist)
- Olive M. Johnson, editor of The Weekly People (Socialist Labor)
- Joseph V. McKee, president of the New York City Board of Aldermen and acting mayor (write-in; draft)
- John P. O'Brien, New York City Corporation Counsel (Democratic)
- William L. Patterson, radical attorney and head of International Labor Defense (Communist)
- Lewis H. Pounds, former New York State Treasurer and Brooklyn Borough President (Republican)

Acting mayor Joseph V. McKee did not seek the office, but a movement led by Roy W. Howard and the New York World-Telegram called for voters to write him in.

=== Results ===
O'Brien won with a majority of the vote, but underperformed Franklin D. Roosevelt's result in the presidential election by 399,061 votes and Herbert H. Lehman's results in the gubernatorial election by 475,050 votes. O'Brien also received a smaller percentage of the vote than Walker had in the 1929 election while Morris Hillquit had received a record high result for the Socialist Party of America in New York City's mayoral elections.

McKee received 249,372 write-in votes, despite not seeking the office.

1932 special mayoral election
Party	Candidate	Votes	%	±%
Democratic	John P. O'Brien	1,056,115	52.29%	▼8.41
Republican	Lewis H. Pounds	443,901	21.98%	▼3.75
Socialist	Morris Hillquit	249,887	12.37%	▼0.06
Independent	Joseph V. McKee (inc.) (write-in)	234,372	11.60%	N/A
Communist	William L. Patterson	24,014	1.19%	▲0.78
Socialist Labor	Olive M. Johnson	11,379	0.56%	▲0.09
Total votes		2,019,668	100.00%	

== Works cited ==
- Mann, Arthur (1965). La Guardia Comes To Power 1933. J. B. Lippincott & Co.
