= Workers' International Industrial Union =

Revolutionary Industrial Union

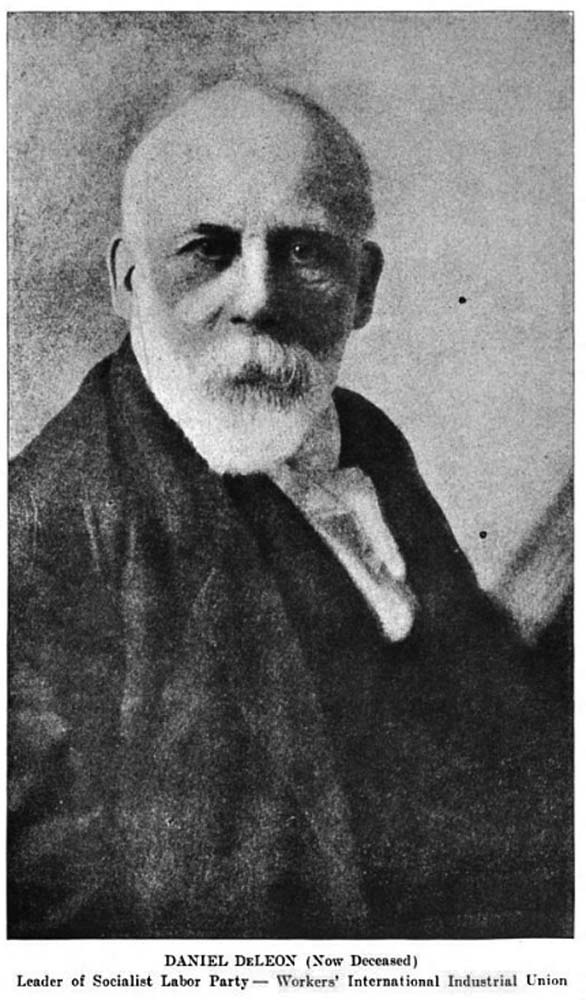
Daniel DeLeon, IWW founder and Marxist political leader who was the leading light of the WIIU

The Workers' International Industrial Union (WIIU) was a Revolutionary Industrial Union headquartered in Detroit in 1908 by radical trade unionists closely associated with the Socialist Labor Party of America, headed by Daniel DeLeon. The organization was formed when it broke with the main faction of the Industrial Workers of the World (IWW) over the question of political action.

After seven years of parallel existence as the so-called "Detroit IWW," the dissident organization changed its name to Workers' International Industrial Union in 1915. The WIIU maintained a presence in the United States, Canada, Britain and Australia before its ultimate dissolution in 1925.

== Organizational history ==
=== Background ===
The 4th Convention of the Industrial Workers of the World (IWW) was convened in Chicago on September 21, 1908, attended by 26 delegates. Despite the small size of the gathering, factional disagreement was already deep within the organization and two delegates were denied their seats at the convention – including one Daniel DeLeon of New York City. DeLeon, powerful editor of the newspaper of the Socialist Labor Party of America (SLP), The People, had already emerged as a sharp critic of IWW leader Vincent St. John and the orientation of the union, which was based upon direct action and tilted towards largely unskilled labor in the Western United States.

Although he had been denied his seat on the technicality of belonging to an incorrect union, supporters of the Socialist Labor Party charged that the failure to seat DeLeon was a crass political maneuver by St. John and his factional ally, William Trautmann, in order to stifle dissent over policy and consolidate their own control of the organization.

DeLeon was granted the floor at the convention to state his case and the resulting dispute was bitter and long-winded. For four days the convention did little more than debate the merits of the Socialist Labor Party and question of whether its intellectual leader, DeLeon, was attempting to take over and control the IWW, subverting the union's interests to those of the SLP. DeLeon's supporters responded with the charge that the ultra-proletarian St. John–Trautmann faction with trying to transform the IWW into a "purely physical force body," dismissing political action altogether.

The fight took the form of an attempt by the anti-parliamentary St. John–Trautmann faction to remove reference to the word "political" from the Preamble of the IWW, a seminal manifesto of the organization. This was met with the epithet by the politically oriented SLP supporters that the St. John–Trautmann group were little more than "veiled dynamiters."

Following protracted debate the anti-political faction won the day at the 4th Convention, electing Vincent St. John the General Secretary-Treasurer of the IWW and William E. Trautmann the organization's General Organizer. A 5-member General Executive Board supportive of the anti-political orientation was also installed, over charges of the SLP faction that the victory of the St. John group was illegitimate.

=== Establishment ===
The dissident supporters of the SLP and political action immediately launched a new rival organization at a conference convened at Paterson, New Jersey on November 5, 1908. Some 18 delegates were in attendance at this rival conference, including representatives from local organizations in Philadelphia, Boston, Brooklyn, and Bridgeport, Connecticut. This gathering declared the regular 4th Convention of the IWW to be an illegal gathering and expelled the so-called "anarchist usurpers" from the IWW organization – of which they claimed exclusive control.

The Paterson conference took steps to reduce per capita dues levied by the national office to just 5 cents per member per month, with a view to keeping more dues money for work at the local level. National Headquarters were temporarily located in New York City, long the base of operations of the SLP. Headquarters were relocated within a few months, however, with the booming industrial city of Detroit, Michigan chosen as the new national center for the political actionists styling themselves as the IWW.

C.H. Chase of New York City was elected as the first General Secretary-Treasurer of the so-called "Detroit IWW," and a governing 5-member Executive Board similarly chosen by the Paterson gathering.

This split between the direct actionist "Chicago IWW" and the political actionist "Detroit IWW" was replicated in Canada, Australia, New Zealand and Britain.

=== Size ===
The number of locals affiliated with the "Detroit IWW" is a matter of some dispute. Of about 200 IWW locals in 1907, St. John's "Chicago IWW" claimed 17 groups defected to the Detroit organization; for its part Detroit claimed the allegiance of 22 local groups at the time of its formation in November 1908. These groups were clustered in the Eastern United States, according to pioneer IWW historian Paul Frederick Brissenden. Other local IWW groups vanished amidst the organizational chaos, with the "Chicago IWW" claiming about 100 locals in 1909 and the "Detroit IWW," just 23.

The WIIU shared much of its membership with the SLP, and struggled after DeLeon's death in 1914.

=== Publications ===
While the SLP's newspaper, The People, would serve as the official organ of the so-called "Detroit IWW" until January 1912, when a new monthly magazine called Industrial Union News would be launched.

=== Ideology ===
Unlike the IWW, which from 1908 onwards constitutionally restricted itself from political alliances, the WIIU advocated political associations, and maintained a close association with the SLP, although (as of 1922) it declined to openly affirm this association. Robert Hoxie, author of Trade Unionism in the United States, referred to the Detroit IWW as socialistic, and the Chicago IWW as quasi anarchistic.

WIIU called for a general lockout of the capitalist class. Instead of leaving means of production to the capitalists and their scabs, the WIIU calls for workers to take possession of the means of production and begin operating them in the interests of society.

The WIIU was criticized for focusing more on propaganda than on organizing workers.

=== Dissolution ===
The WIIU was invited to attend the first conference of the Comintern in 1919, but did not affiliate.

The WIIU never did conduct a strike of any importance.

In 1916, the WIIU claimed a membership of 2,500, while its rival, the Industrial Workers of the World, claimed a total membership of 70,000.

By the 1920s the WIIU was practically – and kindly – overlooked; where it was noticed it was criticized sharply, a ghost from a much more hazy past. The organization was finally disbanded in 1925.
