= Morris Hillquit =

American lawyer and politician (1869–1933)

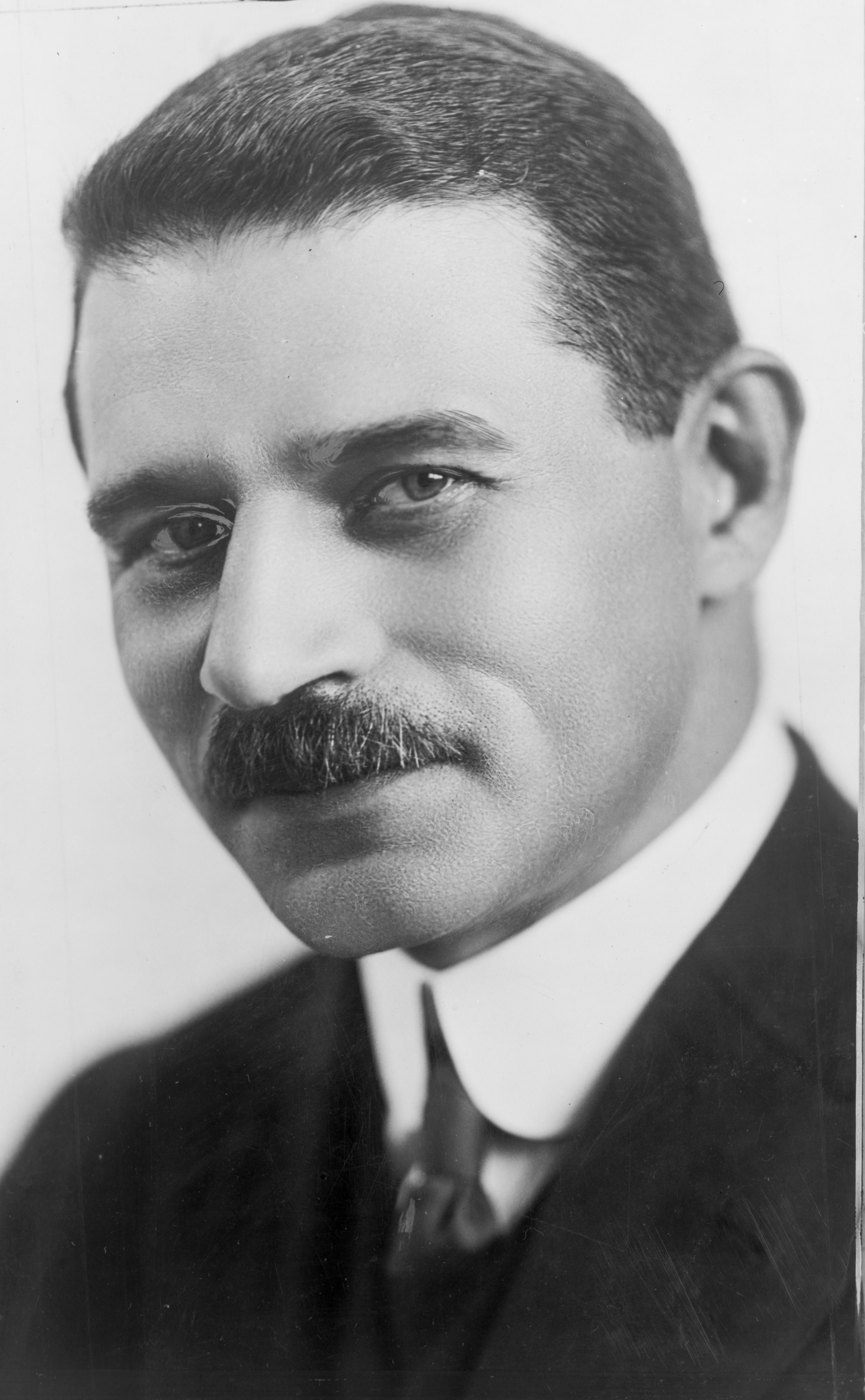
- Hillquit in 1917

National Chairman of the Socialist Party of America
- In office August 7, 1929 – October 8, 1933
- Preceded by: Victor L. Berger
- Succeeded by: Leo Krzycki

Personal details
- Born: Moishe Hillkowitz; August 1, 1869 Riga, Governorate of Livonia, Russian Empire
- Died: October 8, 1933 (aged 64) New York City, New York, U.S.
- Party: Socialist Labor (1887–1899); Social Democratic (1899–1901); Socialist (1901–1933)
- Spouse: Vera Levene (m. 1893)
- Children: Nina; Leonard; Walter
- Occupation: Lawyer, political activist
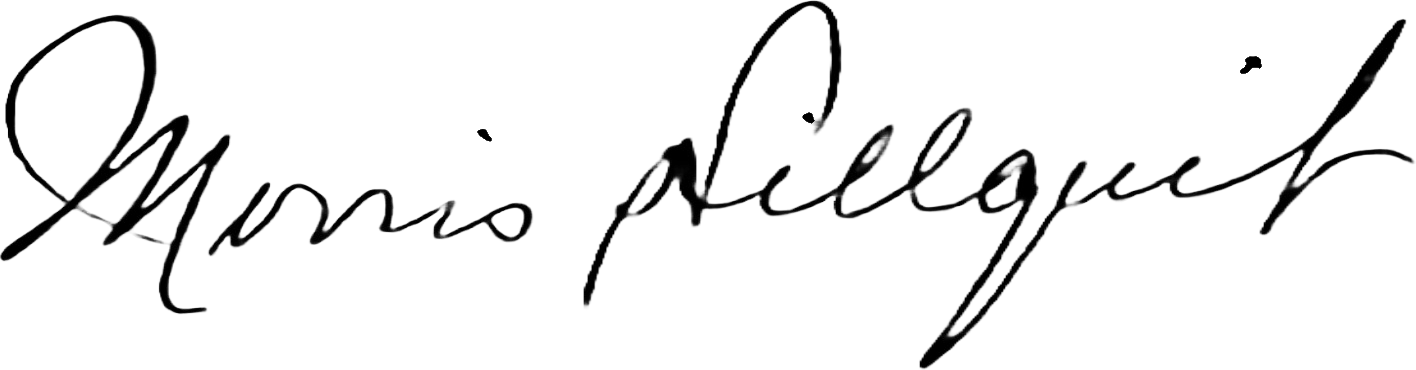
- Signature

Morris Hillquit (August 1, 1869 – October 8, 1933) was a founder and leader of the Socialist Party of America and prominent labor lawyer in New York City's Lower East Side. Together with Eugene V. Debs and Congressman Victor L. Berger, Hillquit was one of the leading public faces of American socialism during the first two decades of the 20th century.

In November 1917, running on an anti-war platform, Hillquit garnered more than 100,000 votes as the Socialist candidate for mayor of New York City. Hillquit again ran for mayor of New York in 1932. He also stood as a candidate for the United States Congress five times over the course of his life, however, he never won election to any of these public offices.

== Early years ==
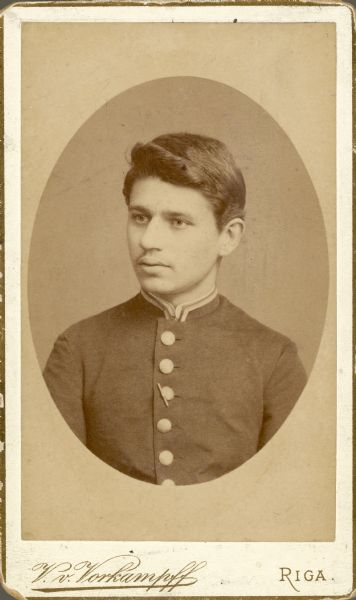
Hillquit in 1886

Hillquit was born Moishe Hillkowitz on August 1, 1869, in Riga, Russian Empire, the second son of German-speaking ethnic Jewish factory owners. From the time he was age 13, young Moishe attended a non-Jewish secular school, the Russian language Alexander Gymnasium. In 1884 when Moishe was 15, his father, Benjamin Hillkowitz, lost his factory in Riga and decided to leave for America to improve the family's financial situation. Together with his oldest son, he set out for New York City, where he procured a two-room apartment in a tenement house.

In 1886, Benjamin sent for the rest of the family, and they joined him in New York. The family remained poor, living in a tenement in a predominantly Jewish area of the Lower East Side. Then he worked on various short-term jobs in the New York City textile industry and as a picture frame maker in a factory. Morris later remembered his family as "frightfully poor," with his older brother and sisters working to help support the family.

Hillquit felt compelled to get a job to help alleviate the family's difficult financial situation. Since his English was poor and his body frail, employment options were limited. He joined other young intellectual émigrés from Tsarist Russia as a shirt-maker, repetitiously stitching cuffs of garments. In his posthumously published memoirs, Hillquit recalled that cuff-making was "the simplest part and required least skill and training," involving the simple stitching of square pieces of cut cloth. The young Hillquit never progressed past that entry-level task as a shirtmaker.

== First political activity ==
Hillquit's biographer, Norma Fain Pratt, remarks that Moishe was quickly drawn to the socialist movement in America:

Almost as soon as he settled in New York, Hillquit was drawn into East Side Jewish radical circles. He was then a small (5'4"), slightly built, frail adolescent with dark hair, dark oval-shaped eyes, and a gentle charming manner. He was immediately attracted to other young Jewish immigrants, mostly former students, now shop workers, who considered themselves intellectuals — a new radical intelligentsia ... For the most part their radicalism was rooted in their experiences in the European socialist and anarchist movements. But emigration and economic hardships in the United States also contributed to their further radicalization. As foreigners in America they were situated far enough outside the society to observe its failings. As frustrated but literate people, they were ambitious enough to participate in it. The young intellectuals were interested in finding alternatives to their present circumstances; their solution was to transform them.

On his 18th birthday in August 1887, the future Hillquit joined the Socialist Labor Party of America, brought into the ranks by a fellow garment worker and Russian language socialist newspaper editor, Louis Miller. Moishe became a member of Section New York's Branch 17, a Russian-speaking unit established by Jewish émigrés from tsarist Russia not long before his joining.

Hillquit used his original surname through 1897.

Within a year or so of joining the SLP, biographer Pratt notes, Moishe became one of the party's leading crusaders against anarchism, publishing a lengthy article "Sotzializm un anarchizm" in the Arbeter Zeitung [Workers' News], a Yiddish newspaper that he helped to establish. Hillkowitz contrasted the individualism of anarchism with the communalism of socialism in the piece. During that time the 19-year-old Hillkowitz worked as the business manager of the Arbeter zeitung, a paper that was jointly founded with Abraham Cahan, Louis Miller, and Morris Winchevsky in an effort to reach the city's Yiddish-speaking immigrant working class about socialism in their own idiom. Hillkowitz, ironically, was not fluent in Yiddish, having been raised with the German and Russian languages.

He helped to found the United Hebrew Trades, a garment workers' union formed in 1888, while writing for the Arbeiter Zeitung. He graduated from New York University Law School in 1893. He was admitted to the New York State Bar Association in November of that same year.

== Early socialist movement ==
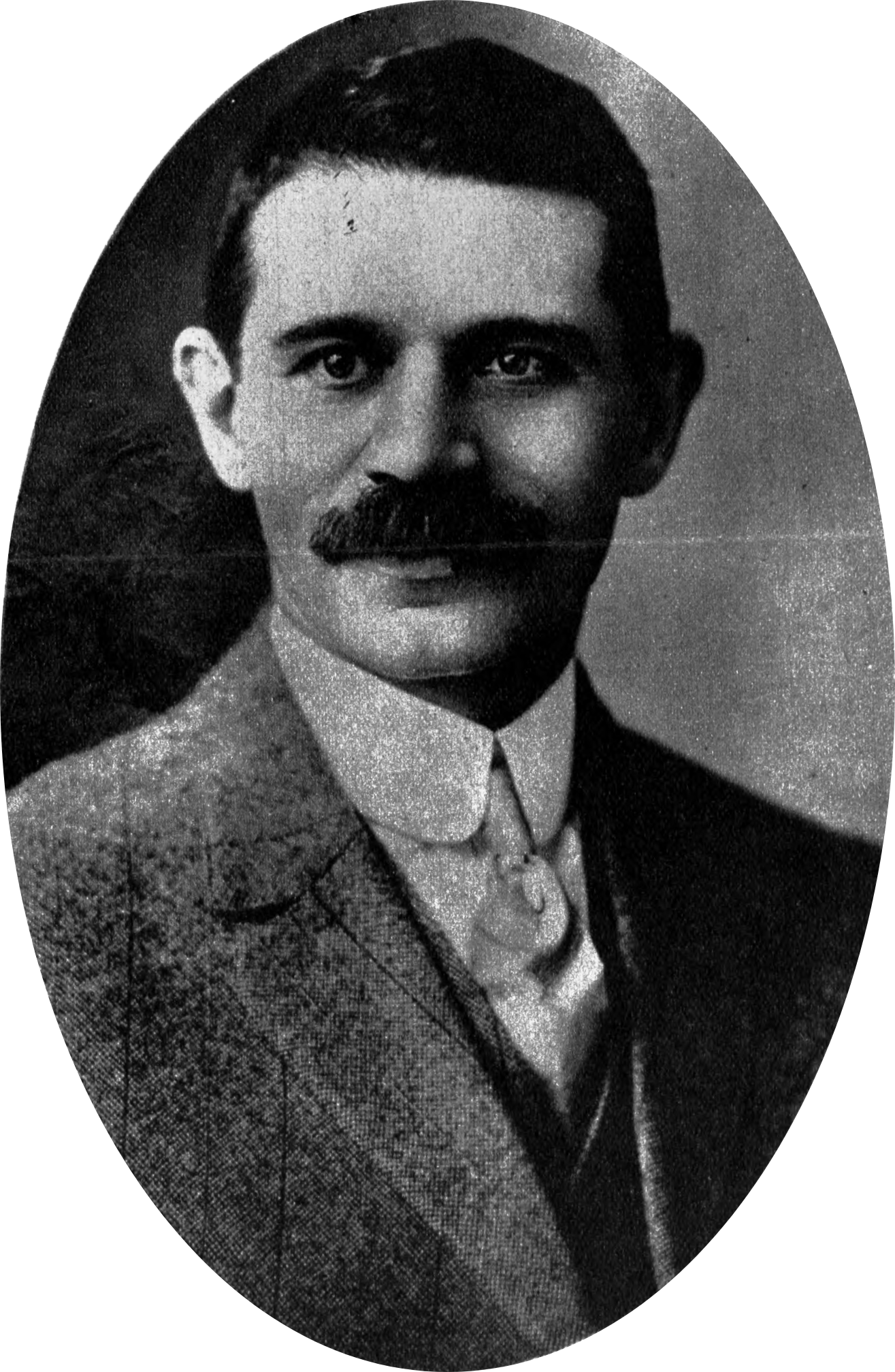
Hillquit in 1900

Hillquit led the departure of a dissident faction from Daniel De Leon's Socialist Labor Party in 1899 and was a delegate to the group's convention at Rochester, New York, in 1900. He was a strong supporter of unity with the Chicago-based Social Democratic Party of Victor Berger and Eugene V. Debs. In August 1901, the two groups managed to bury their differences and come together to form the Socialist Party of America (SPA) at a convention in Indianapolis, which Hillquit also attended.

Morris Hillquit remained one of the paramount political leaders of the Socialist Party for the rest of his life.

Hillquit was a pioneer historian of the American radical movement, publishing a broad scholarly survey in 1903 entitled History of Socialism in the United States. The book would be issued in five English-language editions during Hillquit's lifetime and would be translated into a number of the primary languages of the American socialist movement, including German, Russian, Yiddish, Finnish, and Polish.

In 1904, Hillquit attended the International Socialist Congress at Amsterdam and was involved with the proposed Anti-Immigration Resolution, which opposed any legislation that forbade or hindered the immigration of foreign workingmen, some forced by misery to migrate. The resolution read:

In further consideration of the fact that WORKINGMEN OF BACKWARD RACES (CHINESE, NEGROES, ETC.) are often imported by capitalists in order to keep down the native workingmen by means of cheap labor, and that his cheap labor, which constitutes a willing object for exploitation, live in an ill-concealed state of slavery, — the Congress declares that the Social Democracy is bound to combat with all its energy the application of this means, which serves to destroy the organizations of Labor, and thereby to hamper the progress and the eventual realization of Socialism.

Hillquit ran for U.S. Congress on the Socialist ticket in the New York 9th Congressional District in 1906 and 1908. In the latter campaign, Hillquit garnered 21.23% of the vote in a losing effort against a Democratic incumbent.

== Battle with syndicalist left wing ==
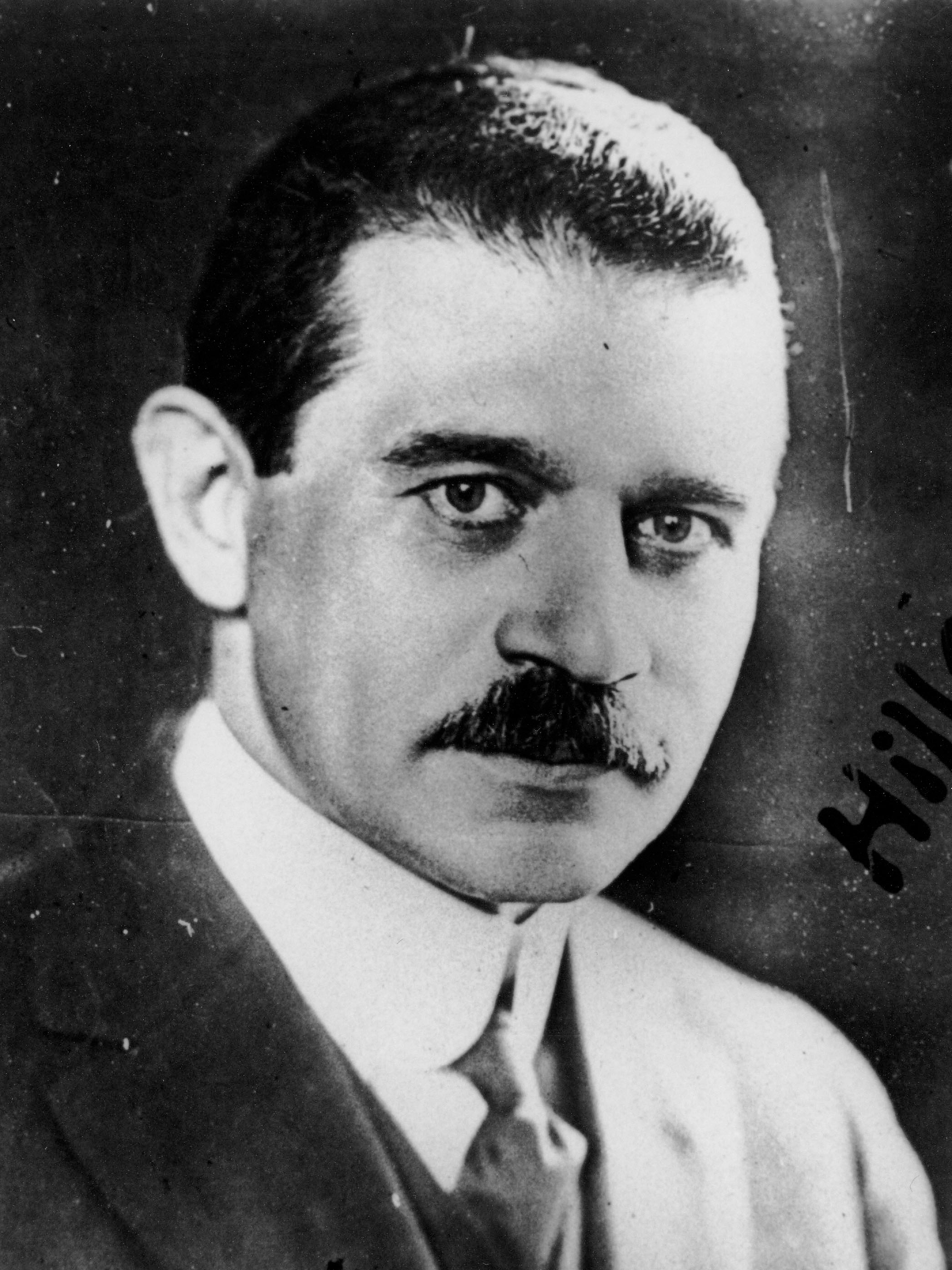
Along with orator Eugene V. Debs and Congressman Victor L. Berger, Hillquit was one of the more recognized public faces of the Socialist Party.

After the campaign, Hillquit turned his attention to inner-party affairs, which brought him into conflict with the SPA's syndicalist Left Wing. His biographer notes at least four serious points of departure between Hillquit and the Industrial Workers of the World wing of the party: a disbelief in the stability and the efficacy of industrial unions, a distaste for the strike-oriented tactics of the IWW as opposed to collective bargaining, a belief in the separation of functions between the political and labor wings of the workers' movement, as opposed to the IWW's desire to make industrial organization primary, and the radical tone of IWW propaganda, which Hillquit believed alienated much of society from the socialist movement and marginalized the left. His biographer declares:

His leadership fanned the fires of Party disagreement, and although [Hillquit] was not alone in causing the break in 1913 with an important segment of its left wing, he certainly made a major contribution towards this unfortunate rupture.

In 1911, IWW leader William "Big Bill" Haywood was elected to the National Executive Committee of the Socialist Party, on which Hillquit also served. The syndicalist and the electoral socialist squared off in a lively public debate in New York City's Cooper Union on Jan. 11, 1912. Haywood declared that Hillquit and the socialists ought to try "a little sabotage in the right place at the proper time" and attacked Hillquit for having abandoned the class struggle by helping the New York garment workers negotiate an industrial agreement with their employers. Hillquit replied that he had no new message rather than to reiterate a belief in a two-sided workers movement, with separate and equal political and trade union arms. "A mere change of structural forms would not revolutionize the American labor movement as claimed by our extreme industrialists," he declared.

Hillquit's battle against the syndicalist left of the party continued at the 1912 National Convention, held in May in Indianapolis. Hillquit's biographer notes that

As chairman of the Committee on Constitution he more than likely authored the amendment to the Party's Article II, Section 6, which provided for the expulsion from the Party of "any member of the party who opposes political action or advocates crime, sabotage, or other methods of violence as a weapon of the working class to aid in its emancipation ..." He voiced his justification for the anti-sabotage amendment by reassuring the convention that "if there is one thing in this country that can now check or disrupt the Socialist movement, it is not the capitalist class; it is not the Catholic Church; it is our own injudicious friends from within."

The issue of "syndicalism vs. socialism" was bitterly fought over the next two years, consummated by "Big Bill" Haywood's recall from the SP's NEC and the departure of a broad section of the left wing from the organization. The radical wing never forgave Hillquit for his anti-IWW orientation and made him a major whipping boy in the big split that was to come.

== War years ==
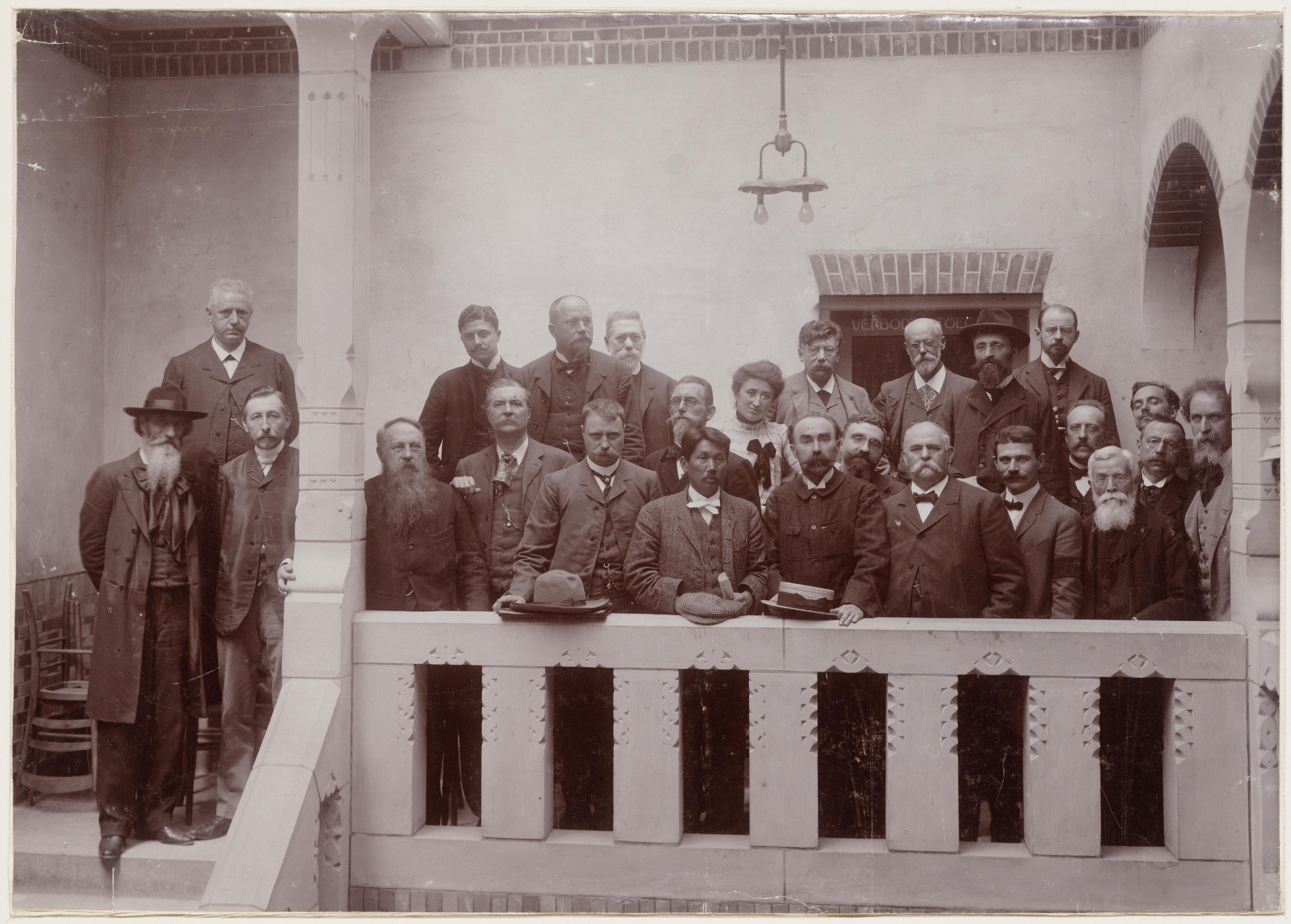
Hillquit among other prominent socialists at the International Socialist Congress in Amsterdam, 1904

As a staunch internationalist and antimilitarist, Hillquit represented the ideological center of the Socialist Party during the years of World War I, which controlled the organization in coalition with the more pragmatist right wing exemplified by such locally oriented leaders, politicians, and journalists as Victor Berger, Daniel Hoan, John Spargo, and Charles Edward Russell. He was elected to the SP's governing National Executive Committee on multiple occasions and was a frequent speaker at national conventions of the party. Due to his foreign birth, however, Hillquit was not constitutionally eligible to serve as president or vice president of the United States and thus never was a candidate of the party for national office.

Hillquit was a principal co-author of the resolution against the US' entry into World War I, which was passed overwhelmingly both by an emergency Socialist Party convention held just after the April 6th, 1917 declaration of war and by a subsequent membership vote. Despite official repression, popular patriotic pressure and vigilante action against the SP of A's organization, members and press, Hillquit never wavered on the issue of intervention, staunchly backing Debs, Berger, Kate Richards O'Hare and other socialists charged under the Espionage Act for opposing the war effort.

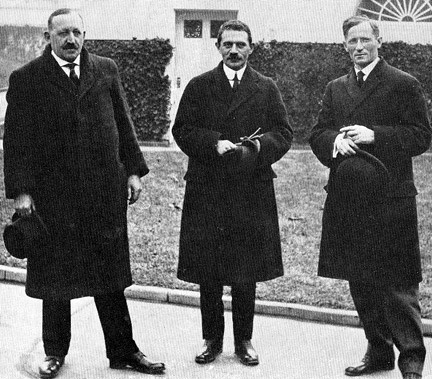
From left to right: Jim Maurer, Morris Hillquit, and Meyer London after their meeting with President Woodrow Wilson, January 1916

On January 26, 1916, Hillquit was part of a three-person delegation to Woodrow Wilson to advocate part of the Socialist Party's peace program, which proposed that "the President of the United States convoke a congress of neutral nations, which shall offer mediation to the belligerents and remain in permanent session until the termination of the war." A resolution had been offered in the House of Representatives by Meyer London of New York, the party's lone representative, and Wilson received Hillquit, London, and socialist trade unionist James H. Maurer at the White House, along with various other delegations. Hillquit later recalled that Wilson was at first "inclined to give us a short and perfunctory hearing" but as the Socialists made their case to him, the session "developed into a serious and confidential conversation." Wilson told the group that he had already considered a similar plan but chose not to put it into effect because he was not sure of its reception by other neutral nations. "The fact is," Wilson claimed, "that the United States is the only important country that may be said to be neutral and disinterested. Practically all other neutral countries are in one way or another tied up with some belligerent power and dependent on it."

Beginning in June 1917, Hillquit served as chief defense lawyer in a series of high-profile cases on behalf of various socialist magazines and newspapers. The Wilson administration, headed in the matter by Postmaster General Albert Burleson, began to systematically ban specific issues or entire publications from the mail, or to force publications into financial peril by denying them access to low-cost periodical rates. Hillquit argued cases on behalf of a number of important radical publications, including Max Eastman's radical artistic and literary magazine, The Masses; the two socialist dailies — the New York Call and the Milwaukee Leader; the SP's official weekly, The American Socialist; the popular monthly Pearson's Magazine; and the Yiddish language The Jewish Daily Forward. In each case, Hillquit argued that the socialist press was truly "American" and that a socialist definition of "patriotism" included the freedoms of press and speech and the right to criticize in a democratic society. Hillquit was unsuccessful in winning access to the mails for the papers he represented, but he did manage to keep the proprietors of The Masses out of prison.

== First mayoral campaign ==
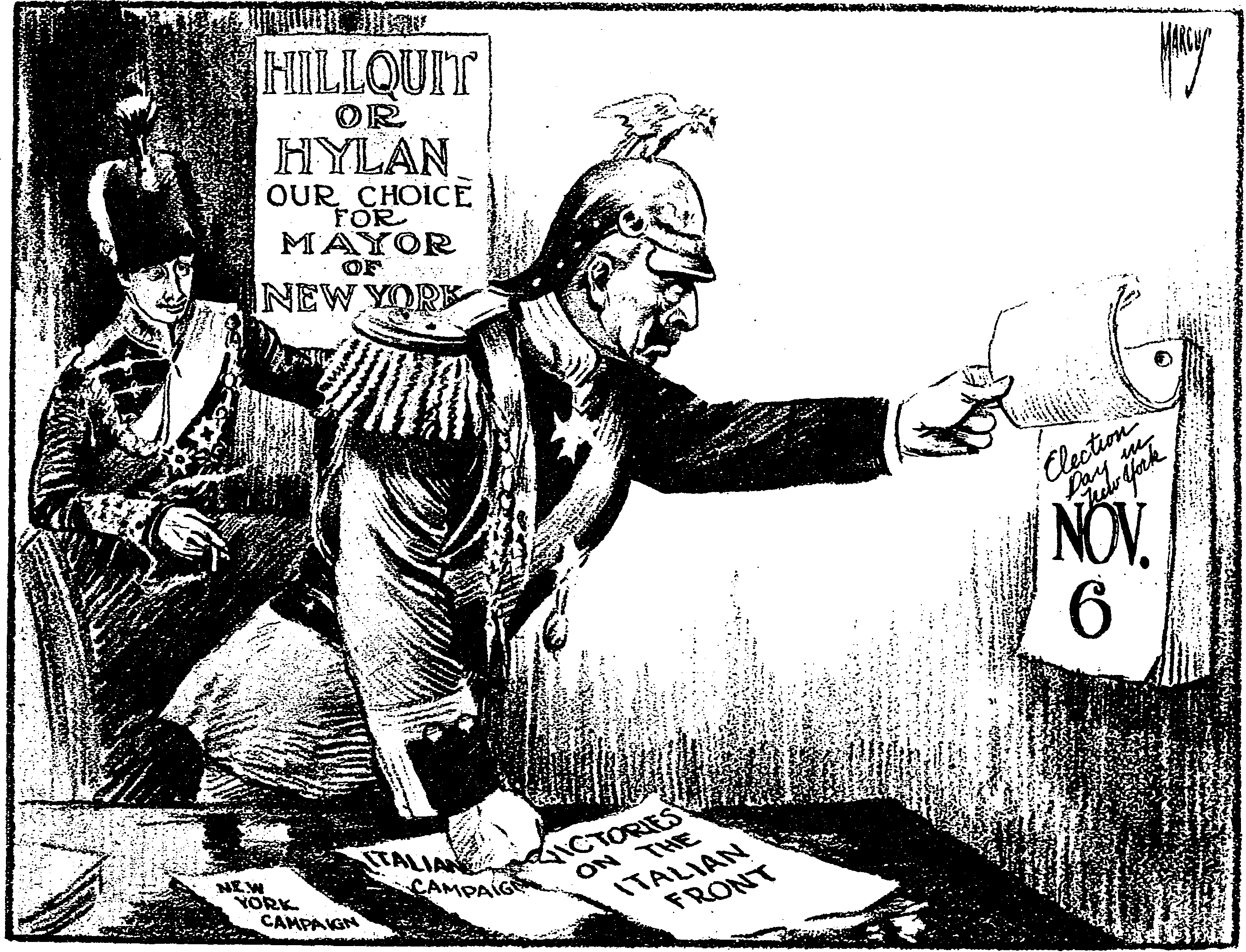
"The New Western Front", a New York Times cartoon implying Kaiser Wilhelm II favored Hillquit and Hylan. The caption read, "Crown Prince: 'Any more victories, Papa?' - Kaiser: 'I can't tell until Tuesday.'"

In the summer of 1917, with nationalism and pro-war sentiment sweeping the nation, Hillquit ran for Mayor of New York City. Hillquit's campaign was based on an anti-war platform and commitment to economical public services and drew the diverse support both of committed socialists, pacifists and other anti-war activists, and pro-war liberals endorsing his campaign as a protest against the government's "sedition" policy, which effectively served to curb freedoms of speech and press. Hillquit seems to have been largely immune from attack by the Socialist Party's left wing or other radicals during the high-profile campaign, which ended with Hillquit collecting an impressive 22% of the citywide vote. That campaign, combined with the ongoing electoral success of Congressman Meyer London (elected as a Socialist in 1914, 1916, and 1920), marked the high point for Socialist Party politics in New York City.

As a member of the SP's National Executive Committee Hillquit worked closely with National Secretary Adolph Germer and James Oneal to defend the party from what in modern parlance might be described as an "unfriendly takeover" by its revolutionary socialist left wing. However, due to ill health Hillquit did not participate in the pivotal 1919 Emergency National Convention at Chicago, which formalized the split of the left wing from the Socialist Party to form the Communist Labor Party of America and the Communist Party of America. Instead, Hillquit was ensconced in a sanitorium in upstate New York, recovering from another bout of tuberculosis, and was informed about the events of the convention after the fact.

== Later career ==
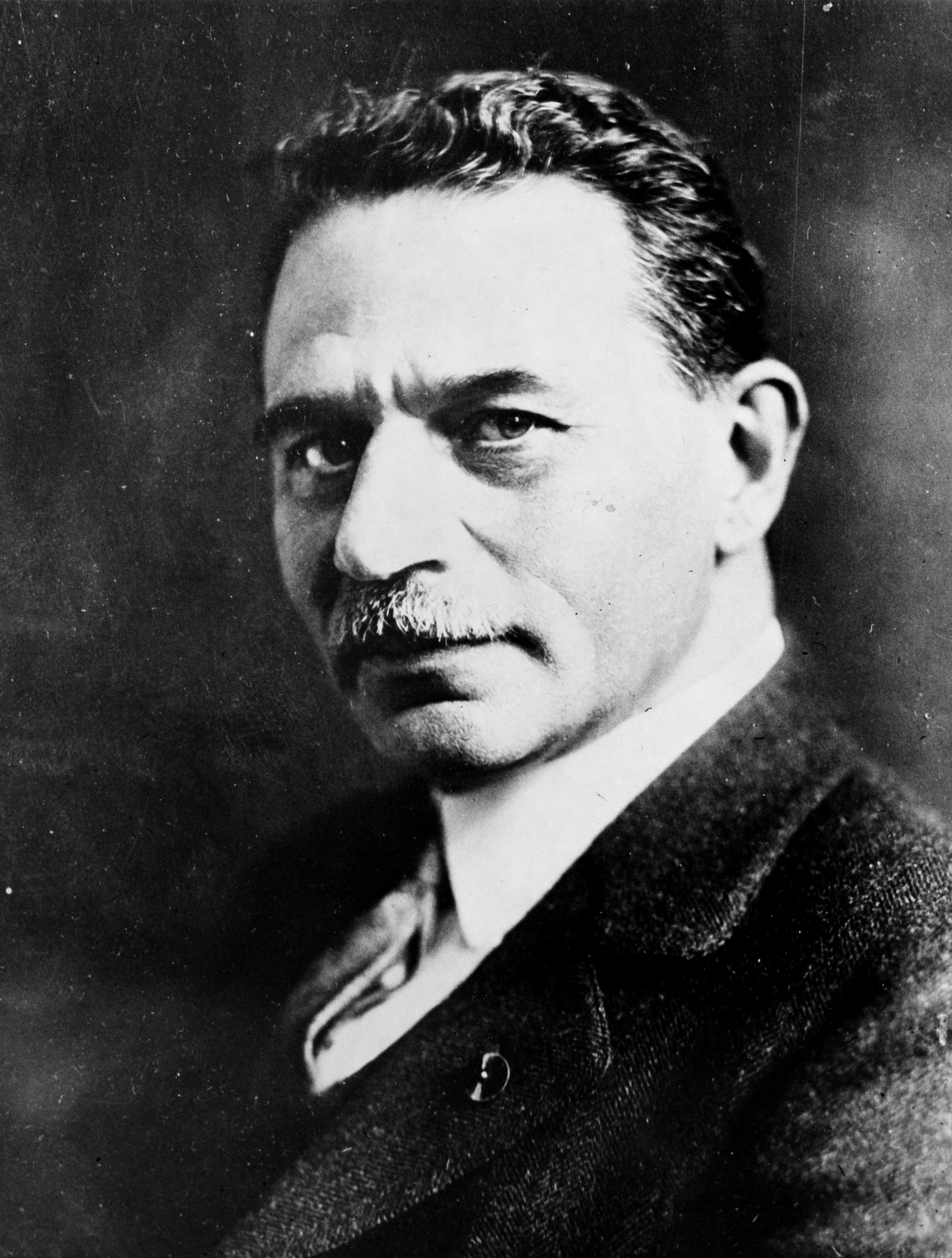
Hillquit in September 1929, shortly after being elected National Chairman of the Socialist Party of America.

In 1920 Hillquit served as the lead attorney in the unsuccessful defense of the five democratically elected Socialist assemblymen expelled from the New York State Assembly. Hillquit's efforts to see Assemblymen Orr, Claessens, Waldman, DeWitt, and Solomon restored to office was ultimately unsuccessful.

Hillquit was elected chairman of the 1920 Convention of the Socialist Party of America, fending off a challenge from the left by J. Louis Engdahl.

From 1922 through the election of 1924, Hillquit was a leading advocate of Socialist Party participation in the Conference for Progressive Political Action (CPPA).

As a celebrated leader of American Marxism and acculturated Jew, Hillquit never became closely associated with the specifically Jewish left wing, but he played a role in the Jewish trade union movement, being for a time the lawyer of the ILGWU. He also never became a Jewish nationalist of any kind; quite the contrary, he was ideologically disposed against it, but in 1926 he confessed, "Zionism makes a strong emotional appeal to me, chiefly as a manifestation of awakening national self respect of the Jewish people." He quickly added however that Zionism, like all other national movements, must guard itself against the dangers of degeneration into jingoism—"If it ever developed in that direction, it will forfeit all claims to Socialist sympathy."

Hillquit became national chairman of the Socialist Party upon the death of Victor L. Berger in 1929, holding the office until his own death in 1933.

In 1932, shortly before his death from tuberculosis, Hillquit received over one-eighth of the vote in his second campaign for Mayor of New York City. That proved to be Hillquit's final electoral run; during his life, he had been twice a candidate for mayor of New York City and five times a nominee for the United States Congress.

== Personal life and death ==
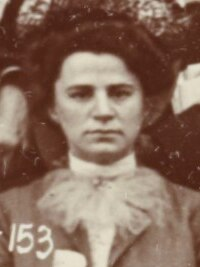
Hillquit's wife Vera at the first Socialist Party of America convention in Chicago, 1904

Hillquit married his first cousin, Vera Levene, on New Year's Eve, 1893. They had three children together: Nina, Leonard, and Walter.

Hillquit died of tuberculosis "a few minutes past midnight on October 8th" of 1933. He was aged 64 at the time of his death.

== Legacy ==
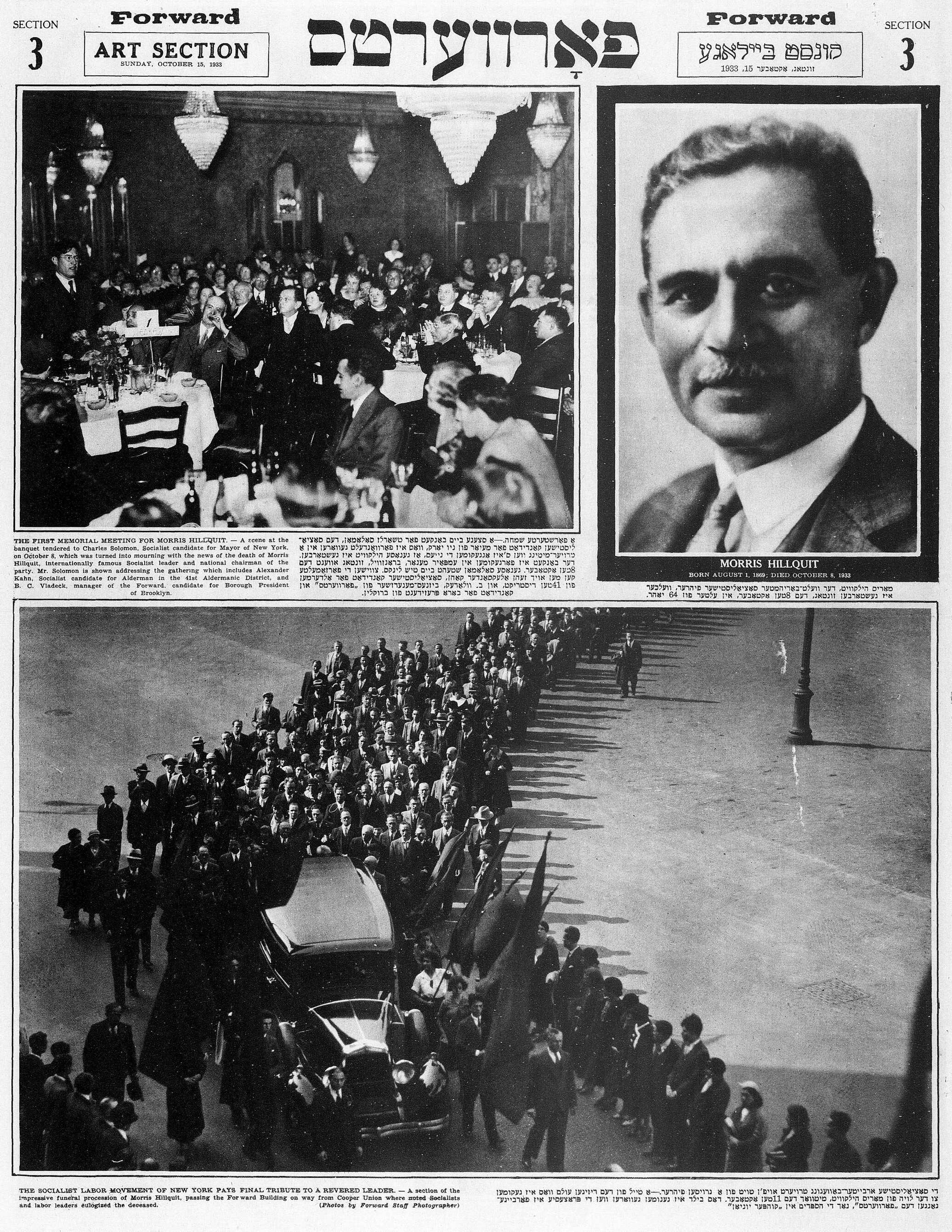
The front page of The Jewish Daily Forward's art section, October 15, 1933, depicting Hillquit, his funeral, and a eulogy delivered by fellow socialist Charles Solomon.

Hillquit was first and foremost an orator, delivering a torrent of public talks on socialist themes to various audiences throughout his life. In his memoirs, Hillquit conservatively estimates the total number of such speeches to have been "at least 2,000." He often appeared in public debates taking up the socialist banner. He wrote frequently for popular magazines and the party press but fairly infrequently for publication in leaflet or pamphlet form.

Despite the fact that Hillquit was not a prolific pamphleteer, he did author a number of substantial books, including a serious academic history of socialism, History of Socialism in the United States (1903, revised 1910 — translated into Russian, German, and Yiddish); works of popularization, such as Socialism in Theory and Practice (1909) and Socialism Summed Up (1912); a short theoretical piece, From Marx to Lenin (1921), as well as a posthumously published memoir, Loose Leaves from a Busy Life (1934).

Hillquit's papers are housed at the State Historical Society of Wisconsin in Madison, Wisconsin, and are available on microfilm.

One of the buildings of the East River Housing Corporation, a housing cooperative started by the International Ladies' Garment Workers' Union in Cooperative Village on the Lower East Side, was named in Hillquit's honor.

== Works ==
=== Books and pamphlets ===
- The People, July 16, 1899, issue
- History of Socialism in the United States. [1903] New York: Funk & Wagnalls, Revised and Expanded (5th) edition, 1910.
- Recent Progress of the Socialist and Labor Movements in the United States: Report of Morris Hillquit, Representative of the Socialist Party at the International Socialist Bureau, to the International Socialist Congress, Held at Stuttgart, Germany, August 18, 1907. Chicago: Charles H. Kerr & Co., 1907.
- Socialism in Theory and Practice. New York: Macmillan, 1909.
- Socialism Summed Up. New York: H.K. Fly, 1912.
- The Immediate Issue. New York: The Socialist, 1919.
- Socialism on Trial. New York: B.W. Huebsch, 1920.
- Present-day Socialism The Socialist Party of the United States, 1920.
- From Marx to Lenin. New York: Hanford Press, 1921.
- Vorläufer des neueren Sozialismus, With Hugo Lindemann. Berlin: Dietz, 1922.
- Foundations of Socialism. Chicago: Socialist Party, National Office, 1934. -Published posthumously.
- Loose Leaves from a Busy Life. New York: Macmillan, 1934. -Published posthumously.

=== Debates ===
- One Big Union or Transformed AF of L? With William D. Haywood. Serialized in Chicago Daily Socialist, Jan. 18–25, 1912.
- Socialism: Promise or Menace? With John A. Ryan. New York: Macmillan, 1914. -Debate with Father John Ryan, a leading Catholic social justice theorist.
- The Double Edge of Labor's Sword, With Samuel Gompers and Max S. Hayes. Chicago: Socialist Party, National Office, 1914.

=== Articles and leaflets ===
- "Farewell to DeLeon," The People [dissident edition, New York], vol. 9, no. 30 (Oct. 22, 1899), pg. 2.
- "The Soldier of the Revolution," The Comrade [New York], vol. 1, no. 1 (October 1901), pp. 16–18. —Short biography of Wilhelm Liebknecht.
- "Moderation, Comrades!" The Socialist [Toledo, Ohio], whole no. 241 (May 6, 1905), pg. 5.
- "The Labor Movement Here and Abroad." Chicago: National Office, Socialist Party, 1911.
- "The Civic Federation and Labor." Chicago: National Office, Socialist Party, 1911.
- "Who are the Peacemakers?" With William Harrison Short. Chicago: National Office, Socialist Party, 1911.
- "Government by the Few." Chicago: National Office, Socialist Party, 1911.
- "The 'Collapse' of the International," The American Socialist [Chicago], v. 1, no. 42, whole no. 130 (May 1, 1915), pg. 3.
- "America's Possible Contribution to a Constructive Peace," Annals of the American Academy of Political and Social Science, vol. 61 (Sept. 1915), pp. 239–242. In JSTOR.
- "Keynote Address to the 1917 Emergency National Convention of the Socialist Party," The World [Oakland, CA], whole no. 578 (April 20, 1917), pg. 6.
- "As to Treason," New York Call, vol. 10, no. 116 (April 26, 1917), pg. 6.
- "Out-Scheidemanning Scheidemann," New York Call, vol. 10, no. 139 (May 19, 1917), pg. 2.
- "The Right of Criticism: Address in Defense of The Call Before Assistant Postmaster General Dockery, Washington, DC -- October 15, 1917." The New York Call, vol. 10, no. 294 (Oct. 21, 1917), pp. 8, 5.
- "The Socialist Task and Outlook," New York Call, vol. 10, no. 141 (May 21, 1919), pg. 8. —So-called "Clear the Decks" article.
- "Socialist Russia Against the Capitalist World," New York Call, vol. 12, no. 312 (Nov. 7, 1919), pg. 8.
- "Radicalism in America," The Socialist World [Chicago], vol. 1, no. 4 (Oct. 15, 1920), pp. 18–19.
- "Moscow and London," The Socialist World [Chicago], vol. 4, no. 7 (July 1923), pp. 6–7.
- The Story of the British Labor Party. Chicago: Socialist Party, n.d. [1923]. First published in The Socialist World [Chicago], vol. 4, no. 9 (September 1923), pp. 3–4.
- "Ferdinand Lassalle (A May Day Reflection)," The Socialist World [Chicago], vol. 6, no. 5 (May 1925), pp. 9–10.
- "A Tribute to Debs," The New Leader [New York], Oct. 23, 1926, pg. 1.
- "Marxism Essentially Evolutionary," Current History, vol. 29, October 1928.
