= Lucien Sanial =

American newspaper editor, economist and activist

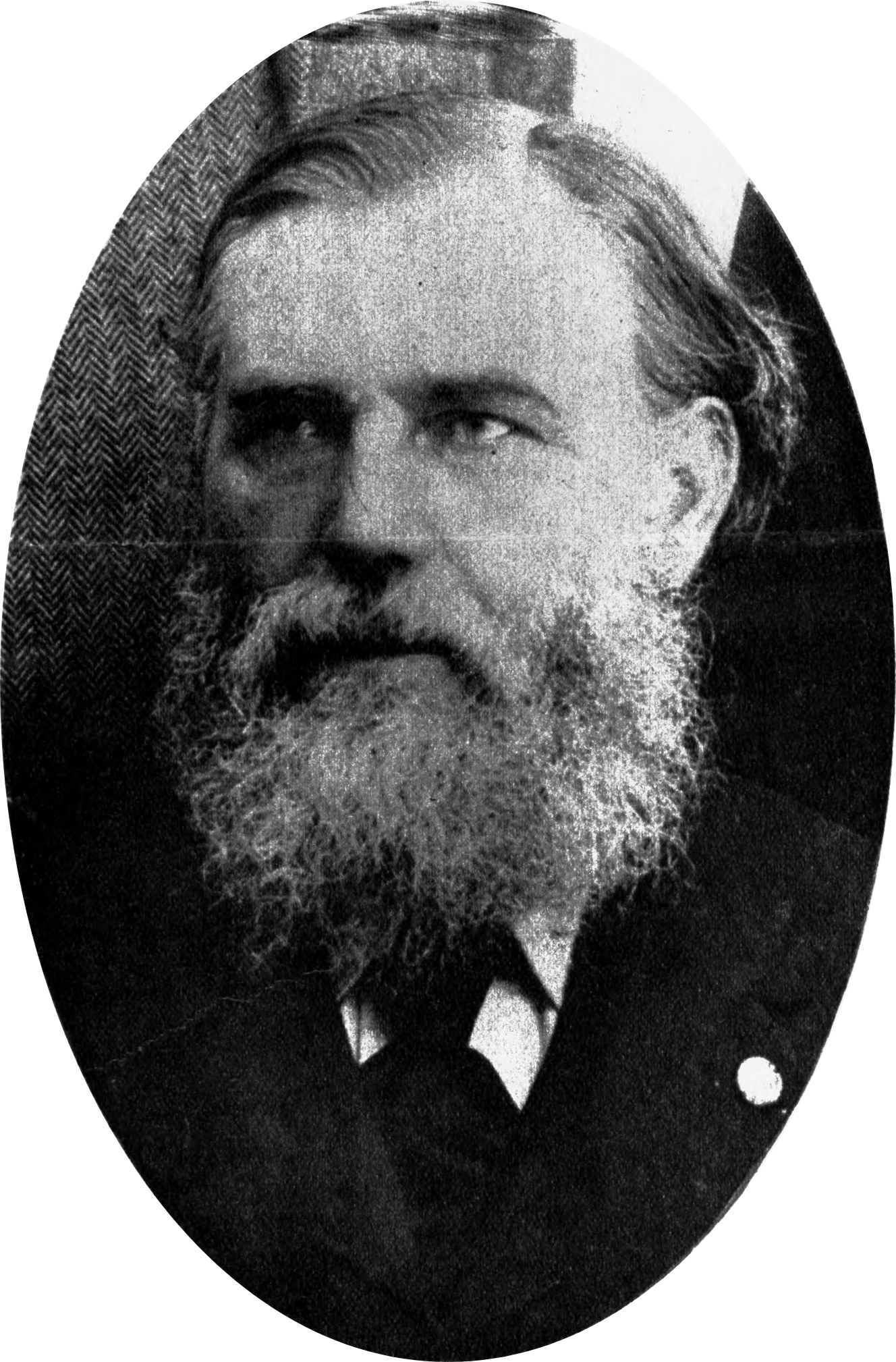
Lucien Sanial

Lucien Delabarre Sanial (12 September 1835 – 7 January 1927) was a French-American newspaper editor, economist, and political activist. A pioneer member of the Socialist Labor Party of America, Sanial is best remembered as one of the earliest economic theorists to deal with the Marxian concept of imperialism.

== Biography ==
=== Early years ===
Lucien Sanial was born September 12, 1835 in France, the son of a man who was a medical doctor and scientist. Sanial attended secondary school in France before enrolling in the Polytechnical School of the University of Charlemagne.

Sanial first came to the United States in 1862, when he was sent by the Paris Temps (Paris Times) as a war correspondent during the American Civil War. Sanial subsequently chose to take up permanent residence in America.

=== First political activities ===
Sanial joined the fledgling Socialist Labor Party of America (SLP), one of the first Marxist political parties in the United States in 1877, just one year after its formation.

Sanial pursued a career in journalism, working as the editor of a series of politically oriented newspapers, including The Toiler, The Issue, and the Daily Telegraph.

In 1886 Sanial became active in the political campaign of Henry George in his effort to become Mayor of New York City. Together with his future comrades in the Socialist Labor Party, Hugo Vogt and Daniel DeLeon, Sanial served on the Organization Committee for the United Labor Party—the political entity back of George's mayoral bid.

The SLP suffered an organizational split in 1889 over the matter of tactics, pitting a group dedicated to political action headed by Wilhelm Rosenberg against others favoring an orientation based upon the development of socialist influence in the trade unions. Sanial emerged as a prominent leader of the latter orientation, which won the day in the factional war. For the next decade Sanial would stand alongside DeLeon, Vogt, and Executive Secretary Henry Kuhn as one of the most influential figures of the SLP.

Sanial played a lasting role as the primary author of the SLP's 1889 party platform, a document which broke from previous tradition of presenting a short summary of socialist principles including instead the favor of colorful oratory basing its case upon the arguments advanced in the Declaration of Independence. Sanial's language would be readopted with only minor revisions by SLP conventions for decades after.

Sanial was also active in the formation of the New York Nationalist Club, an organization organized to promote the ideas regarding the nationalization of industry advanced by the utopian socialist writer Edward Bellamy in his best-selling novel, Looking Backward. Also participating in the formation of the New York Nationalist Club was the 35-year-old DeLeon, employed at the time as a lecturer at Columbia University.

Cover of Sanial's seminal 1901 pamphlet on imperialism, Territorial Expansion.

Following the victory of the trade union faction in 1889, Sanial was named the editor of the SLP's English-language official organ, The Workmen's Advocate, and its successort, The People. He would remain in this position for about two years, stepping down as editor in August 1891, ostensibly for reasons of failing eyesight and so he could attend the Brussels Congress of the Second International on behalf of the SLP. Sanial was succeeded by his pugnacious associate editor, Daniel DeLeon—a man who would famously remain in the role of SLP newspaper editor until his death more than two decades later.

=== Battles with Gompers ===
New York's socialists and left wing trade unionists were deeply dissatisfied with the Central Labor Union (CLU) of New York, which they believed to be dominated by conservatives, and in February 1889 established a rival Central Labor Federation (CLF), which included 38 trade unions and the Section New York of the SLP, whose delegate was Sanial. This group received a charter from the American Federation of Labor (AF of L), headed by Samuel Gompers, as a constituent member of that organization. This schism was settled, and in December 1889 the Central Labor Union and Central Labor Federation united under the name of the former organization.

A spirit of uneasiness remained, however, as the left wing unionists came to feel the moderates showed insufficient zeal towards the movement for an 8-hour day and suspected corruption, while the moderates felt the union movement was being manipulated by socialists for political ends. In June 1890, the left wing again decided to bolt the organization, reestablishing the Central Labor Federation.

This time, however, Gompers and the AF of L refused to issue a charter to the CLF, using its decision to allow admission of Section New York SLP as a pretext for this denial. DeLeon and Sanial became bitter critics of the AF of L and its leadership, battling with the Gompers majority at successive AF of L annual conventions from 1890 to 1894. In 1895 the SLP admitted defeat in its effort at boring from within in an effort to radicalize the AF of L and established a new socialist labor federation of its own, the Socialist Trade and Labor Alliance.

=== Further SLP activities ===
Sanial was twice a political candidate of the SLP for Mayor of New York, standing for election to that post in the campaigns of 1894 and 1897. He also ran as the SLP's candidate for United States Congress in the 16th District of New York state in 1896.

Sanial was chosen several times as a delegate of the Socialist Labor Party to international congresses of the world socialist movement.

During the last years of the 19th Century Sanial would become involved with the question of imperialism, intrigued by the pattern of American expansion in the era of the Spanish–American War. Sanial would publish on the theme in 1901 in a seminal pamphlet entitled Territorial Expansion, anticipating the work of John A. Hobson (1902) and Vladimir Ul'yanov (Lenin) (1916).

In 1893 Sanial was tapped to write the annual report of the United States government's Bureau of Labor Statistics.

=== The Socialist Party and after ===
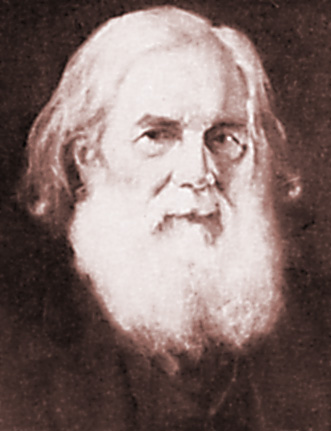
Sanial later in life

In 1899 the trade union-oriented SLP split again, this time pitting party regulars seeking to continue the party's dual unionist approach of supporting the Socialist Trade and Labor Alliance against those who favored the support of the established unions affiliated to the American Federation of Labor. While he did remain in the SLP until about 1902, Sanial eventually decided to cast his lot with the departing elements, becoming a member of the Socialist Party of America, and organization which the former SLP dissidents had helped establish.

During the years of World War I, Sanial broke with the Socialist Party over its opposition to American intervention in the European war on behalf of the Entente powers. Sanial found himself teaming up with his old nemesis Samuel Gompers as an active member of the American Alliance for Labor and Democracy, a political pressure group established by the AF of L in order to build support among the working class for the American war effort.

=== Death and legacy ===
Lucien Sanial died on January 7, 1927, in the village of Northport in Suffolk County on Long Island, New York. He was 91 years old at the time of his death.

== Works ==
- The True American Policy: Protect Labor: An Address to the Working Men by the Editor of "America.' New York: National Chamber of Industry and Trade, 1882.
- Land and Machinery: A Lecture Delivered before the New York American Section of the Socialist Party. New York: New York Labor News Co., n.d. [c. 1885].
- The Socialist Almanac and Treasury of Facts. (Editor.) New York: Socialistic Cooperative Publishing Association, 1898.
- I. Taxation; II. Genesis of Religion : III. The SLP Vote in Greater New York. New York: National Executive Committee, Socialist Labor Party, 1899.
- "The New Trusts," in I. The New Trusts. II. The Middle Class, Its Origin, Its Rise, Its Decline. III. The Foreign Trade of the United States in 1880 and 1898. IV. German Trade Unionism. V. Socialist Labor Party of Canada; Socialist Vote of California. New York: Socialistic Cooperative Publishing Association, 1899.
- Territorial Expansion: Together with Statistics on the Growth of Socialism in America. New York: New York Labor News Co., 1901.
- General Bankruptcy or Socialism: Facts and Figures Heretofore Withheld from the Public Eye and Showing the Futility of Any Legislative "Reform" Having for its Object to Prevent Panics and the Final Collapse of the Banking Power. New York: Cooperative Press, 1913.
- Report of Lucien Sanial as a Member of the Committee on Banking, Bank Credit, Currency and Monetary Systems of the United States to the National Committee of the Socialist Party, in Meeting Assembled at Chicago, Ill., on May 9th, 1915. Chicago: Socialist Party of America, 1915.
