= Olive M. Johnson =

Swedish-American socialist, newspaper editor, and political activist

Olive M. Johnson, editor of The Weekly People from 1918 to 1938.

Olivin "Olive" Malmberg Johnson (March 14, 1872 – June 16, 1954) was a Swedish-American socialist, newspaper editor and political activist. She is best remembered as a long-time editor of the weekly English-language newspaper of the Socialist Labor Party of America.

== Biography ==
Olivin Malberg was born March 14, 1872, in Lund, Sweden, the daughter of a merchant. The family emigrated to the United States in the 1890s, with Olive graduating high school in Minneapolis, Minnesota.

Olive joined the Socialist Labor Party of America (SLP) in 1895. She acted as a lecturer and speaker on behalf of the party beginning in 1898. She worked variously as a retail clerk, restaurant worker, office worker, housekeeper, and teacher.

Malmberg was married to another member party member by the name of Johnson, took his name, and moved with him to California. The Johnsons' marriage eventually ended, but as was the custom of the day, Olive kept her former husband's surname after its dissolution. She never remarried.

Johnson attended Hunter College in New York City, from which she obtained a bachelor's degree in 1916, at the age of 44. She later did graduate course work at Columbia University and New York University.

=== Political career ===
Johnson was a close friend and trusted political associate of party leader Daniel DeLeon (1852–1914). She was first elected a member of the governing National Executive Committee of the SLP in 1904, remaining in that capacity until 1912. She joined DeLeon as a delegate of the SLP to the 1910 Copenhagen Congress of the Second International and was a delegate to many of the SLP's quadrennial national conventions, beginning in 1904.

Johnson was also close to Arnold Petersen (1885–1976), the Danish-born successor to Daniel DeLeon's mantle as top leader of the Socialist Labor Party. In 1918, Johnson became editor of the SLP's official newspaper, The Weekly People, replacing Edmund Seidel, who had begun advocating a merger with the leftward tilting Socialist Party of America. She remained in that position for 20 years, also writing many articles and pamphlets on behalf of the party. A number of Johnson's pamphlets were translated into Swedish, Hungarian, Ukrainian, and Croatian by the various foreign language federations of the SLP.

As editor of the SLP's official organ, Johnson continued to advocate a harsh line towards other political organizations on the left. Historian Ben Perry notes:

"Her editorial positions were especially hostile to the Communist and Socialist parties and the anti-political Industrial Workers of the World, but she also condemned the CIO as well as non-revolutionary movements such as the cooperative movement and the New Deal. She was very active during this period, not only as editor, but also as a pamphlet writer, speaker, and candidate for public office."

On the SLP ticket, Johnson ran for Governor of New York in 1918, for Mayor of New York City in 1929, and for U.S. Senator from New York in 1934.

Johnson was elected by the SLP as its fraternal delegate to the 3rd World Congress of the Communist International in 1922, but was refused a passport to travel by the American government.

In the early 1930s Johnson contracted tuberculosis, a disease which sapped her vitality, and she was forced to handle the editorial tasks of The Weekly People more and more from her home. In 1938 she retired from editing the newspaper.

=== Death and legacy ===
Olive M. Johnson died in Malibu, California, on June 16, 1954, at 82 years of age. Her ashes were scattered at Topanga Canyon, California where she had lived with her brother Nils Malmberg for several years.

== Works ==
- Woman and the Socialist Movement: Published Under the Auspices of the Socialist Women of Greater New York. New York: New York Labor News Co., 1908. (Reissued 1919).
- Americanism: An Open Letter to the Board of Education, New York. New York : Socialist Labor Party, 1920.
- Revolution: "Dictatorship" and "Suppression" Incidental to Social Progress. New York: Socialist Labor Party, 1923.
- Daniel De Leon, American Socialist Pathfinder. New York: New York Labor News Co., 1923.
- The Cooperative Movement: An Infantile Disorder and an Old-Age Disease. New York: New York Labor News Co., 1924.
- The Socialist Party: A Quarter Century Later: From the Kangaroo Exodus to La Follette. New York: Socialist Labor Party, 1924.
- Karl Marx: Forty years After (1883-1923). With Daniel DeLeon. New York: Socialist Labor Party, 1924.
- The Soviet Revolution, 1917-1927: A Historical Comparison. New York: Socialist Labor Party, 1927.
- Russia in Revolution: Selected Editorials. With Daniel DeLeon. New York: New York Labor News Co., 1927.
- The Reform Vote versus the Revolutionary Vote: The Socialist Party - Workers (Communist) Party: Petty Bourgeois Twins Contrasted with the Revolutionary Socialist Labor Party. New York: Socialist Labor Party, 1929.
- The Spy in the Labor Movement: Essays. With Paul LaFargue. New York: Socialist Labor Party, 1929.
- Industrial Government: Industrial Feudal Autocracy versus Industrial Democracy. With Arnold Petersen. New York: New York Labor News Co., 1930.
- The Socialist Labor Party during Four Decades: 1890-1930. With Henry Kuhn. New York: New York Labor News Co., 1931.
- The School To The Teacher. New York: New York Labor News Co., 1932.
- Americanism: Reaction Subverting the Constitution and the American Tradition. New York: Socialist Labor Party, 1935.
- Industrial Unionism. With Thomas Grady. New York: New York Labor News Co., 1935.
- The Virus of Anarchy: Bakuninism vs. Marxism. With Arnold Petersen. New York: New York Labor News Co., 1935.
- May Day vs. Labor Day: A Comparison of the Social Significance of the Two Days of Labor Celebration. New York: New York Labor News Co., 1936.
- Revolution. With Arnold Petersen. New York: New York Labor News Co., 1936.
