= Solon De Leon =

American labor activist (1883–1975)

Solon De Leon Lobo (September 2, 1883 – December 3, 1975) was an American author and editor who documented and was active in the American Labor movement. Perhaps his greatest and most lasting contribution was The American Labor Who's Who which is a registry or directory of people involved in the American labor movement.

== Biography ==
=== Early life and academic career ===
Solon De Leon was born in New York City on September 2, 1883. He was the son of Daniel De Leon, an early leader in the American Labor movement. He graduated from New York City College in 1902. After that he worked in Connecticut as a carpenter, a house painter, and a teacher. De Leon received an MA in economics from Columbia University, where his father had gone to school, in 1912 and a degree in social work from the New School of Social Work, which was then called the New York School of Philanthropy, in 1913 at the age of 30.

=== Later career ===
During the 1930s, he taught science and shop at the Walden School, a private progressive school in New York. He was also a nature and shop counselor at children's summer camps. De Leon wrote under pseudonyms at times. As Bert Grant, he wrote a science and nature column for the New Pioneer. From 1943 to 1964 De Leon was assistant research director for the National Maritime Union and there is documentation of correspondence between him and the president of the union regarding his termination. He was also active in the Labor Research Association during the 1960s, and was a regular contributor of articles and book reviews to its publication “Economic Notes.” De Leon also worked as a librarian and French instructor at Kittrell Junior College, a Historically Black College in North Carolina from 1965 to 1967.

=== Political career ===
He was employed by the American Association for Labor Legislation as a field investigator, writer, and researcher, 1912-1920, while continuing to contribute to Socialist Labor Party of America (SLP) publications under the pseudonym, Braset Marteau, but became politically and personally estranged from his father and from the SLP and was expelled from the Party in 1918. He was briefly a member of the Socialist Party of America, joining the Workers' Council group that became part of the Communist party in 1920. Ideological conflicts between him and his father, and other members of the Socialist labor party eventually led to his estrangement from his father and the party. De Leon contributed to and helped to edit the Advance, the Amalgamated Clothing Workers of America's newspaper from 1919 to 1922. He was the director of the labor research department, Rand School of Social Science, during the 1920s, and edited the “American Labor Year Book” published by the Rand School. As a member of the Communist Party, he was a member of the National Advisory Council, and on the executive committee for the New York branch of the Young Pioneers of America from its founding in 1924.

=== Writings ===
Solon De Leon returned to New York in 1905 to work on the SLP publications Daily People and Weekly People as a reporter and assistant editor. He translated several works from French including The Brass Bell and The Sword of Honor by Eugene Sue and Patriotism and the Worker by Gustave Herve for publication by the SLP publishing house and the New York Labor News Company. In addition to the American Labor Yearbook, Solon De Leon was the editor of the American Labor Who's Who, a registry of those who were involved and influential in the American Labor movement, including in unions, immigrant rights and civil liberties organizations, and progressive political leaders of the working class struggle in general. Published in 1925, the work created a portrait of the American Labor Movement.

=== Family ===
His father Daniel De Leon, a Marxist theoretician, a leading figure of the Socialist Labor Party (SLP) and forefather of industrial unionism with his own brand of revolutionary industrial unionism. His mother Sarah Lobo was part of a prominent Jewish family of Caracas, Venezuela. She died in childbirth in 1887 when Solon was just four years old. Although his parents were Jewish, he was unaware of this until he was an adult.

=== Death ===
Solon De Leon died in Ellenville, N.Y., on December 3, 1975.
