= Socialist Trade and Labor Alliance =

Former trade union of the United States

Logo of the ST&LA, circa 1898

The Socialist Trade and Labor Alliance – commonly abbreviated STLA or ST&LA – was a revolutionary socialist labor union in the United States closely linked to the Socialist Labor Party (SLP), which existed from 1895 until becoming a part of the Industrial Workers of the World at its founding in 1905. During its existence, the STLA essentially operated as the revolutionary, "dual union" wing of the SLP.

== History ==
The idea to found the Socialist Trade and Labor Alliance likely came from Daniel DeLeon, a leader in the Socialist Labor Party. Before 1895, DeLeon and the SLP had worked within the Knights of Labor, but then they were driven out.

The STLA was formally founded at a meeting at Cooper Union Hall on Friday, December 13, 1895. Attendees to the meeting included officials from District Assembly 49 of the Knights of Labor, which had been 'bored' into by the SLP, women distinguished in East Side (NYC) labor activities, and delegates from the recent American Federation of Labor (AFL) convention. Speakers included William Brower, John F. Tobin, J. Mahlon Barnes, Lucien Sanial, and Daniel DeLeon.

At the following convention of the SLP in 1896, it formally endorsed the Socialist Trade and Labor Alliance. Hugo Vogt represented the labor union at the convention and promised that it would "not be affiliated with any capitalist party and will not support any political action except that of the Socialist Labor Party."

The organization of the STLA was very similar to that of the Knights of Labor. It differed from the American Labor Union and the IWW, which it would later become a part of, in that it was not structured industrially. It radically resented the established trade unions, like the American Federation of Labor; its Declaration of Principles asserted that "the methods and spirit of labor organization are absolutely impotent to resist the aggressions of organized capital".

The union was, however, never able to reach a mass following. Its on-paper membership total likely never eclipsed 30,000. It did not organize or control any large factories and was only able to organize one significant strike – in Slatersville, Rhode Island (now part of North Smithfield), which was, however, a great failure. In 1905, at that union's founding convention, the STLA became a part of the Industrial Workers of the World, an industrial union. Some in the IWW feared that DeLeon, who became an important leader in the organization, would attempt to make it a shadow of the SLP, as the STLA had been. In 1908, the IWW was split and DeLeon and some of his fellow STLA members left it.

== Conventions ==
Number	Dates of convention	Location	Delegates
First	July 5–?, 1896	New York City	
Second	July 5–?, 1897	Boston	
Third	July 4–7, 1898	Buffalo	
Fourth	Sept. 18–?, 1899	New York City	
Fifth	Sept. 19–?, 1900	Pittsburgh	55
Sixth?	Dec. 4, 1902	Hartford	

== Archives ==
- Guide to the Socialist Labor Party Records, 1877–1907. Collection Number: 5168. Kheel Center for Labor-Management Documentation and Archives, Cornell University Library. Consist of the official records of the Socialist Labor Party from its organization in 1877 until 1907. Retrieved September 19, 2006.

== See also ==
- Labor federation competition in the U.S.
