= The People (American newspaper) =

Newspaper in New York City, New York

- Type: Daily (1900–1914), Weekly (1914–?), Monthly (2003–2008)
- Publisher: Socialist Labor Party
- Editor: Lucien Sanial (1891), Daniel De Leon (1892–1914), Edmund Seidel (1914–1918), Olive M. Johnson (1918–1938), Emil Teichert (1938), Eric Hass (1938–1980)
- Founded: 1891
- Ceased publication: 2008 (print) 2011 (online)
- Relaunched: 2008 (online only)
- Political alignment: Socialist
- Language: English
- Website: http://www.slp.org/

The People was an official organ of the Socialist Labor Party of America (SLP), a weekly newspaper established in New York City in 1891. The paper is best remembered as a vehicle for the ideas of Daniel DeLeon (1852–1914), the dominant ideological leader of the SLP from the 1890s until the time of his death. The paper became a daily in 1900, reverting to weekly publication in 1914 for budgetary reasons. Publication of the paper was moved to Palo Alto, California, during its later years, finally terminating publication in 2008. Its 117 years of continuous publication make The People the longest running socialist newspaper in the history of American political radicalism.

== Publication history ==
=== Forerunners ===
The privately owned Workmen's Advocate of the Socialist Labor Party was the direct antecedent of the party-owned broadsheet, The People.

The Workingmen's Party of the United States was established in August 1876 and renamed itself as the Socialist Labor Party of America at its National Congress in Newark, New Jersey a year later. The members of the organization were predominantly immigrants from Germany throughout its earliest years, although the SLP did maintain 7 English-speaking Sections by the end of 1877.

Bolting trade union-oriented Marxists established a newspaper called The Labor Standard in 1877, although no official English-language publication existed until the governing National Executive Committee established The National Socialist in Cincinnati, Ohio in May 1878. This publication was in existence only a short time before budgetary concerns forced its abrupt termination, with a Chicago newspaper called The Socialist emerging as the main English-language organ of the organization. The party's German-speaking majority were served by a privately owned daily, the New Yorker Volkszeitung (New York People's News), which first saw print in 1878.

The SLP's English-speaking membership atrophied during the first half of the 1880s and the organization had no official English paper for several years. Instead, the organization launched and briefly maintained an official organ in German, Der Sozialist (The Socialist), published in New York City from 1885 to 1887. It was not until a privately owned weekly, The Workmen's Advocate, debuted in New Haven, Connecticut by the Trades Council of New Haven on September 8, 1883, that the SLP's English-speaking members again had access to a party-oriented newspaper in their own language. It would be this publication from which The People would emerge.

=== Establishment ===
Volume 1, number 1 of The People was unveiled on April 5, 1891, as the first party-owned English weekly since termination of The National Socialist. The large broadsheet was produced on the press owned by the association which published the Volkszeitung and Sunday was initially chosen as the weekly publication day. First editor of the publication was Lucien Sanial (1835–1927), a French-born veteran of the socialist movement.

Sanial was soon shunted aside however, resigning as editor in 1892 to make way for the rising star of the SLP's firmament, a university lecturer recently converted to Marxism named Daniel DeLeon. Although Sanial's leaving was ostensibly related to failing eyesight and other physical difficulties associated with old age, few active in the party doubted that the actual reason for Sanial's removal related to a simple need to seat the energetic and intense DeLeon in the editorial chair. DeLeon would remain at the post until his death in May 1914.

DeLeon proved to be a highly effective editor of the 4-page weekly, contributing a stream of articles which aggressively excoriated purported systemic defects of capitalism, while expounding the benefits of the socialist system. DeLeon's consistent and confrontational leftism in the pages of the party weekly soon propelled him to a position of high authority among the SLP's rank-and-file membership, even exceeding that of the nominal political chiefs of the organization.

=== 1899 split ===
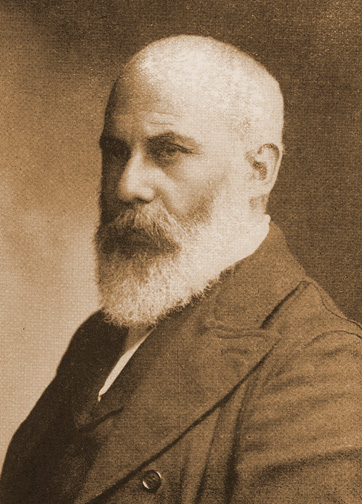
Editor Daniel DeLeon as he appeared around the turn of the 20th century

As the decade of the 1890s progressed, the Socialist Labor Party became deeply divided over the relationship of the party to the trade union movement, with Daniel DeLeon and his co-thinkers supportive of dual unionism through the SLP's 1896 establishment of a socialist rival to the American Federation of Labor and Knights of Labor called the Socialist Trade and Labor Alliance. The organization's division over the matter converged around the party press, with The People and the SLP's official German paper, Vorwärts, filled with attacks upon so-called "pure and simple labor unions" and their allegedly corrupt officers.

An Anti-DeLeon "opposition faction" headed by Morris Hillquit and Henry Slobodin emerged, grouping themselves around the widely circulated New Yorker Volkszeitung. These insurgents expressed critical support for the AF of L and its unions, seeking to radicalize these through the tactic of boring from within. In July 1899 matters came to a head with the anti-DeLeon insurgents of New York calling a special meeting at which the offices of Executive Secretary, the members of the National Executive Committee, and editorship of The People were declared vacant.

There followed a period of organizational dualism, in which two groups both claimed for themselves the mantle of the Socialist Labor Party, each with their own officers and their own official English-language newspaper called The People. The paper changed to a daily frequency in 1900, thereby becoming The Daily People, ultimately reverting to the previous name in 1914 when financial concerns forced a retreat to weekly status. This name was maintained for decades.

Ultimately the DeLeon regulars won rights to the name of the paper in the courts and the dissident edition of The People was supplanted in April 1901 by the establishment in New York City of The Worker — lineal forerunner of the New York Call. That same year the anti-DeLeon dissidents of the so-called "Springfield Social Democratic Party" became one of the primary components of a new organization called the Socialist Party of America.

=== Early 20th century ===
The first two decades of the 20th century proved to be the period of greatest political influence for The People. In conjunction with the SLP's publishing house, the New York Labor News Company, an array of Marxist articles and pamphlets saw print, including the first American publication of Marx's Critique of the Gotha Program in the pages of The People on January 7, 1900. In addition to translations by DeLeon of the so-called Marxist classics, new speeches and writings by DeLeon himself were published, such as The Burning Question of Trade Unionism (1904) and Flashlights of the Amsterdam Congress (1906).

A sharply critical and at times venomous rhetorical tone was maintained in the pages of The People against the perceived opponents and rivals of the SLP. In 1911 a series of 30 articles were published in the paper's pages analyzing the day-to-day activities of Victor L. Berger, elected as the first Socialist to the U.S. Congress in the fall of the previous year. These articles were later collected in pamphlet form in a tract entitled Berger's Hit and Misses. Similarly, a series of 19 articles by DeLeon in The People written against the ideas of a popular anti-socialist priest, Thomas Gasson, were later gathered into pamphlet form as Father Gassoniana.

=== Later years ===
Following the death of Daniel DeLeon in 1914, the editorial helm of The People was turned over to Edmund Seidel, an advocate of merger between the Socialist Labor Party with the rival Socialist Party of America. The proposition was controversial within both organizations and such unification was not to be. Seidel was replaced in 1918 by Olive M. Johnson, a consistent opponent of the SPA in the tradition of DeLeon. Johnson was re-elected to the post by the membership of the SLP at its conventions of 1920, 1924, 1928, 1932, and 1936 without opposition.

Johnson retired from the editorial chair in 1938, following a case of tuberculosis which sapped her strength. Some historians believe her to have been forced out by Arnold Petersen, the powerful National Secretary of the organization. Following Johnson's retirement in February 1938, Emil Teichert took over as editor of The People on a temporary basis.

A membership referendum vote was held in 1938 to elect a new permanent editor for the paper, pitting Teichert against Eric Hass, one of the party's National Organizers who had recently completed journalism course work at the University of Kansas. This balloting was won by Hass, who thereby became the 5th official editor of The People.

In the subsequent three decades, the publication maintained a relatively stable weekly circulation, hitting a low of 9,000 in 1925 to a high of 11,450 in 1945, including individual subscriptions and bundle orders for free distribution.

=== Termination and legacy ===
As the membership of the SLP declined in the late 20th century, The People moved from a weekly to a monthly production cycle. In 2003, the paper began to be published every other month, finally terminating in print form effective with the issue of March–April 2008. Thus ended a print run of 117 years — by far the longest continuous run of any socialist or communist publication in the history of American radicalism.

A short-lived effort to revitalize the publication as an on-line quarterly followed, commencing in the Summer of 2008 and ending in the fall of 2011, at which time the publication ceased publication indefinitely.

The People remains readily available to activists and scholars of labor history and radical politics on microfilm, the master negative of which is held by the Wisconsin Historical Society in Madison.

== Socialist Studies ==
The organization published a series called Socialist Studies from 1981 to 1983 The series was inaugurated in 1981. Many of the titles in the series were articles reprinted from the SLP's official journal, The People. The series titles are:

1981

- On Reformism (No. 81-1)
- On the Transition to Socialism (No. 81-2)
- Women and the Socialist Movement (No. 81-3)
- Socialists and Abortion Rights (No. 81-4)
- Morality and Class Struggle (No. 81-5)
- Productivity and Inflation (No. 81-6)
- Unity on the Left (No. 81-7)
- The History Behind the Holocaust (No. 81-8)
- How Socialism Would Solve Unemployment (No. 81-9)
- Capitalism and Capital Punishment (No. 81-10)
- The Class Struggle in Poland (No. 81-11)
- The Labor Movement and El Salvador (No. 81-12)
- The Abortion Issue: A Socialist View (No. 81-13)
- Reform in the UMWA (No. 81-14)
- The Middle East Conflict (No. 81-15)
- The Polish Crisis (No. 81-17)
- Socialism Means Workers' Control (No. 81-18)
- What Is Class Consciousness? (No. 81-19)
- On the 'Law of Value' (No. 81-20)

1982

- Class Strategy Needed for ERA (No. 82-1)
- Origins of Women's Oppression (No. 82-2)
- Poland and the American Left (No. 82-3)
- Economics of Militarism (No. 82-4)
- The Role of a Socialist Party (No. 82-5)
- Imperialism and World Hunger (No. 82-6)
- Inequalities Within the Working Class (No. 82-7)
- What Is 'Dual Unionism'? (No. 82-8)
- The SLP and the Unions (No. 82-9)
- Automation and Unemployment (No. 82-10)
- Why Factories Close Down (No. 82-11)
- Why Capitalism Can't Care for the Elderly (No. 82-12)
- Arms Control: A History of Futility (No. 82-13)
- The Changing Composition of the Working Class (No. 82-14)

1983

- On Women and Work (No. 83-3)

Unknown

- The Socialist Labor Party and the Law of Value
- The History Behind the Holocaust
- Nationalism: Working Class Nemesis
- Earth Day & May Day: Two Views of the Future
- Stand Up and Be Counted!
- Workers and the 'Workerless' Economy
- Is Cuba Socialist?
