= Daniel De Leon =

Curaçaoan-American unionist and socialist (1852–1914)

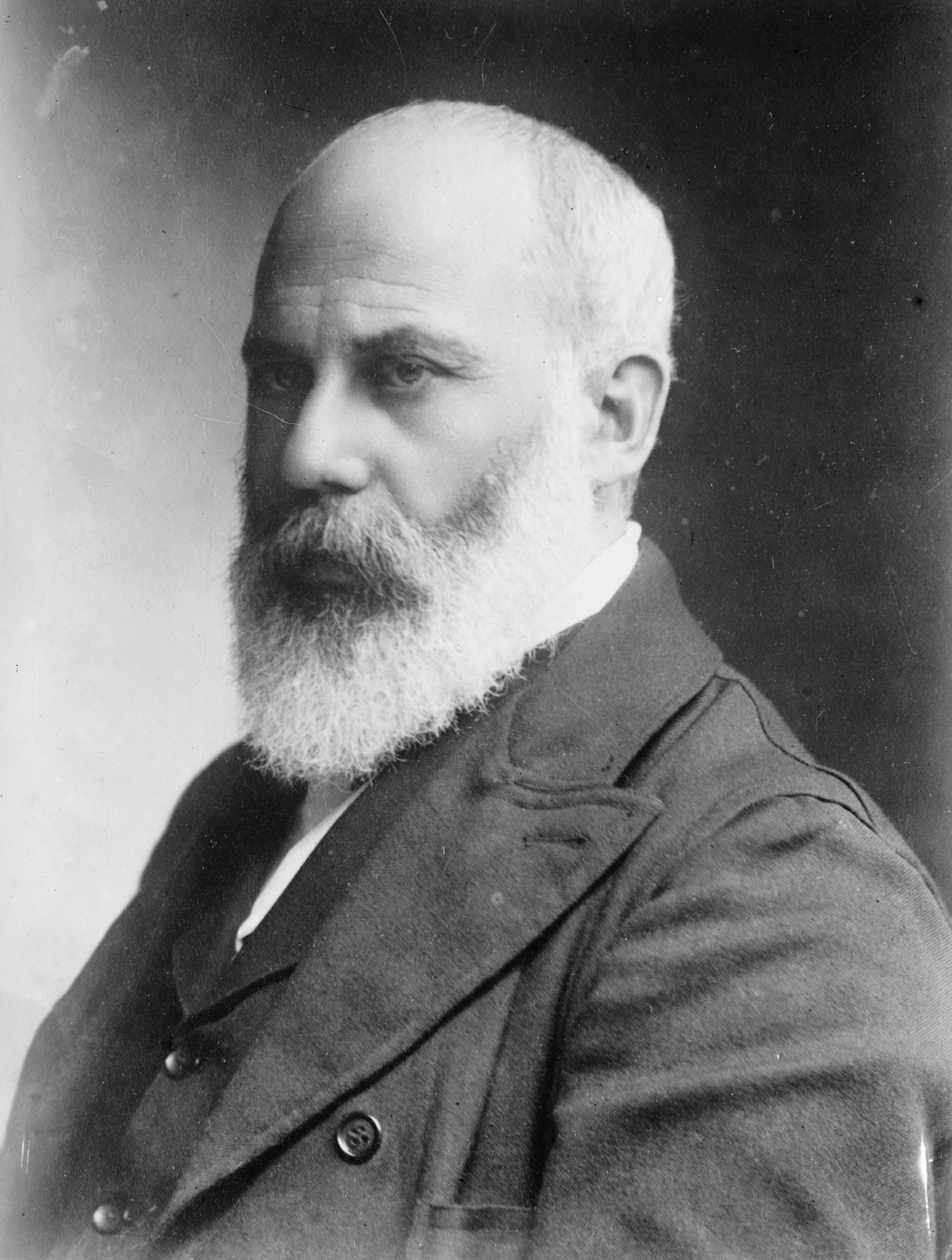
- De Leon in 1902
- Born: December 14, 1852; Curaçao, Curaçao and Dependencies (Note: Given De Leon was born in a Dutch colony, he was Dutch by birth and became a naturalized American.)
- Died: May 11, 1914 (aged 61); New York City, U.S.
- Other name: Daniel de León
- Education: Leiden University; Columbia University (LLB)
- Occupations: Editor; Marxist theoretician; union organizer
- Organizations: Knights of Labor; Industrial Workers of the World; Workers' International Industrial Union
- Known for: Marxism–De Leonism
- Height: 5 ft 5 in (165 cm)
- Political party: Socialist Labor Party
- Movement: American Labor Movement
- Spouses: Sarah Lobo (died 1887) Bertha Canary (m. 1892)
- Children: 9, including Solon

Daniel De Leon (/dəˈliːɒn/; December 14, 1852 – May 11, 1914), alternatively spelled Daniel de León, was a Curaçao-born American socialist newspaper editor, politician, Marxist theoretician, and trade union organizer. He is regarded as the forefather of the idea of revolutionary industrial unionism and was the leading figure in the Socialist Labor Party of America from 1890 until the time of his death. De Leon was a co-founder of the Industrial Workers of the World and much of his ideas and philosophy contributed to the creations of Socialist Labor parties across the English-speaking world, including: Australia, the United Kingdom, Canada, and the Socialist Trade and Labor Alliance.

== Early life and education ==
Daniel De Leon was born December 14, 1852, in Curaçao, the son of Salomon de Leon and Sarah Jesurun De Leon. His father was a surgeon in the Royal Netherlands Army and a colonial official. Although he was raised Catholic, his family ancestry was Dutch Jewish of the Spanish and Portuguese community; "De León" is a Spanish surname, oftentimes toponymic, in which case it can possibly indicate a family's geographic origin in the Medieval Kingdom of León.

His father lived in the Netherlands before coming to Curaçao when receiving his commission in the military. Salomon De Leon died on January 18, 1865, when Daniel was twelve and was the first to be buried in the new Jewish cemetery.

De Leon left Curaçao on April 15, 1866, and arrived in Hamburg on May 22. In Germany he studied at the Gymnasium in Hildesheim and in 1870 began attending the University of Leiden in the Netherlands. He studied medicine at Leiden and was a member of the Amsterdam student corps, but did not graduate. While in Europe he had become fluent in German, Dutch, French, English, ancient Greek and Latin, in addition to his first language Spanish. Sometime between 1872 and 1874 he emigrated to New York, with his wife and mother. There he found work as an instructor in Latin, Greek and mathematics at Thomas B. Harrington's School in Westchester, New York. In 1876 he entered Columbia College, now Columbia University, earning a Bachelor of Laws (LLB) with honors 1878.

== Early career ==
From 1878 to 1882, he lived in Brownsville, Texas, as a practicing attorney, then returned to New York. While he maintained an attorney's office until 1884 he was more interested in pursuing an academic career at his alma mater, Columbia. A prize lectureship had been created in 1882. To be eligible a candidate had to be a graduate of Columbia, a member of the Academy of Political Science and read at least one paper before the academy. The three year appointment came with a $500 annual salary ($17,000 in 2025 terms) and required the lecturer to give twenty lectures a year, based on original research, to the students of the School of Political Science. De Leon devoted his lectures to Latin American diplomacy and the interventions of European powers in South American affairs. He received his first term in 1883 and his second term in 1886. In 1889 he was not kept on. Some allege that the university officials denied him a promised full professorship because of his political activities, while other believe that his subject was too esoteric to be a permanent part of the curriculum.

De Leon published no papers about Latin America during this period, but he did contribute an article to the debut issue of the academy's Political Science Quarterly on the Berlin West Africa Conference. He also wrote reviews on Franz von Holtzendorff's Handbuch des Völkerrechts in June 1888 and its French translation in March 1889 for the same publication.

== Political career ==
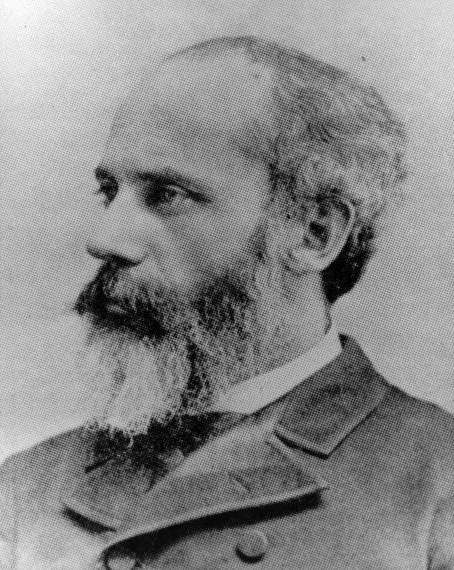
De Leon in 1895

De Leon settled in New York City, studying at Columbia University. He was a Georgist socialist during the 1886 Mayoral campaign of Henry George and in 1890 joined the Socialist Labor Party, becoming the editor of its newspaper, The People. He quickly grew in stature inside the party and in 1891, 1902, and 1904 he ran for the governorship of the state of New York, winning more than 15,000 votes in 1902, his best result.

De Leon became a Marxist in the late 1880s, and argued for the revolutionary overthrow of capitalism, trying to divert the SLP away from its Lassallian outlook. Some argue that his famous polemic with James Connolly showed him to have been an advocate of Ferdinand Lassalle's subsistence theory of wages. Others question this assertion because by the same logic Marx and Engels could be described as advocates of the Iron Law because language in The Communist Manifesto and Value, Price and Profit pertaining to the level of wages and temporary effect of union activity on working conditions is similar to the language used by De Leon in his answer to Connolly, and the 'iron law of wages' is a Malthusian theory which De Leon did not indicate any support for.

De Leon was highly critical of the trade union movement in America and described the craft-oriented American Federation of Labor as the "American Separation of Labor". At this early stage in De Leon's development, there was still a considerable remnant of the general unionist Knights of Labor in existence, and the SLP worked within it until being driven out. This resulted in the formation of the Socialist Trade and Labor Alliance (ST&LA) in 1895, which was dominated by the SLP.

DeLeon was the editor of the official newspaper of the Socialist Labor Party from 1890 until his death in 1914.

By the early 20th Century, the SLP was declining in numbers, with first the Social Democratic Party and then the Socialist Party of America becoming the leading leftist political force in America (as these splinter groups embraced capitalist reforms). De Leon was an important figure in the US labor movement, and in 1904 he attended the International Socialist Congress, held in Amsterdam. Under the influence of the American Labor Union (ALU), he changed his politics around this time to put more focus on industrial unionism, and the ballot as a purely destructive weapon, in contrast to his earlier view of political organization as 'sword' and industrial union as 'shield'. He worked with the ALU in the founding of the Industrial Workers of the World (IWW) in 1905. His participation in this organization was short-lived and acrimonious.

De Leon later accused the IWW of having been taken over by what he called disparagingly 'the bummery'. De Leon was engaged in a policy dispute with the leaders of the IWW. His argument was in support of political action via the Socialist Labor Party while other leaders, including founder Big Bill Haywood, argued instead for direct action. Haywood's faction prevailed, resulting in a change to the Preamble which precluded "affiliation with any political party." De Leon's followers left the IWW to form a rival Detroit-based IWW, which was renamed the Workers' International Industrial Union in 1915, and collapsed in 1925.

== Personal life ==
De Leon traveled back to Curaçao to marry the 16-year-old Sarah Lobo from Caracas, Venezuela. The Lobos were a prominent Jewish family in the area that lived in both the Dutch Antilles and Venezuela. After a traditional Jewish wedding in Caracas the family moved to a Spanish speaking area of Manhattan, at 112 West 14th street where their first son, Solon De Leon would be born on September 2, 1883. By the mid to late 1880s the family was living on the Lower East Side. In 1885 or 1886 another child, Grover Cleveland De Leon was born but only lived a year and a half. On April 29, 1887, Sarah Lobo De Leon died in childbirth while delivering stillborn twins; it was the same year that Grover had died. After this the De Leons left the Lower East Side and moved in with their housekeeper Mary Redden Maguire at 1487 Avenue A.

In 1891, while on a speaking tour around the country for the SLP, De Leon found himself in Kansas when he learned that a planned speaking engagement in Lawrence had been canceled. He decided to head to Independence, Kansas, where he had been advised there was some sympathy for the socialist movement. He arrived on April 23 and was hosted by a 26-year-old school teacher, Bertha Canary, who was the head of a local Bellamyite group, the Christian Socialist Club. Canary was familiar with De Leon, having read some of his articles in the Nationalist Club movement press, and the two apparently became infatuated with each other. She was a member of a Congregational Church and in 1892 they were married in South Norwalk, Connecticut. They had five children: Florence, Gertrude, Paul, Donald and Genseric. He named the latter, according to Solon De Leon, after the medieval king Genseric, a Vandal who made the Pope kiss his toes.

== Death and legacy ==
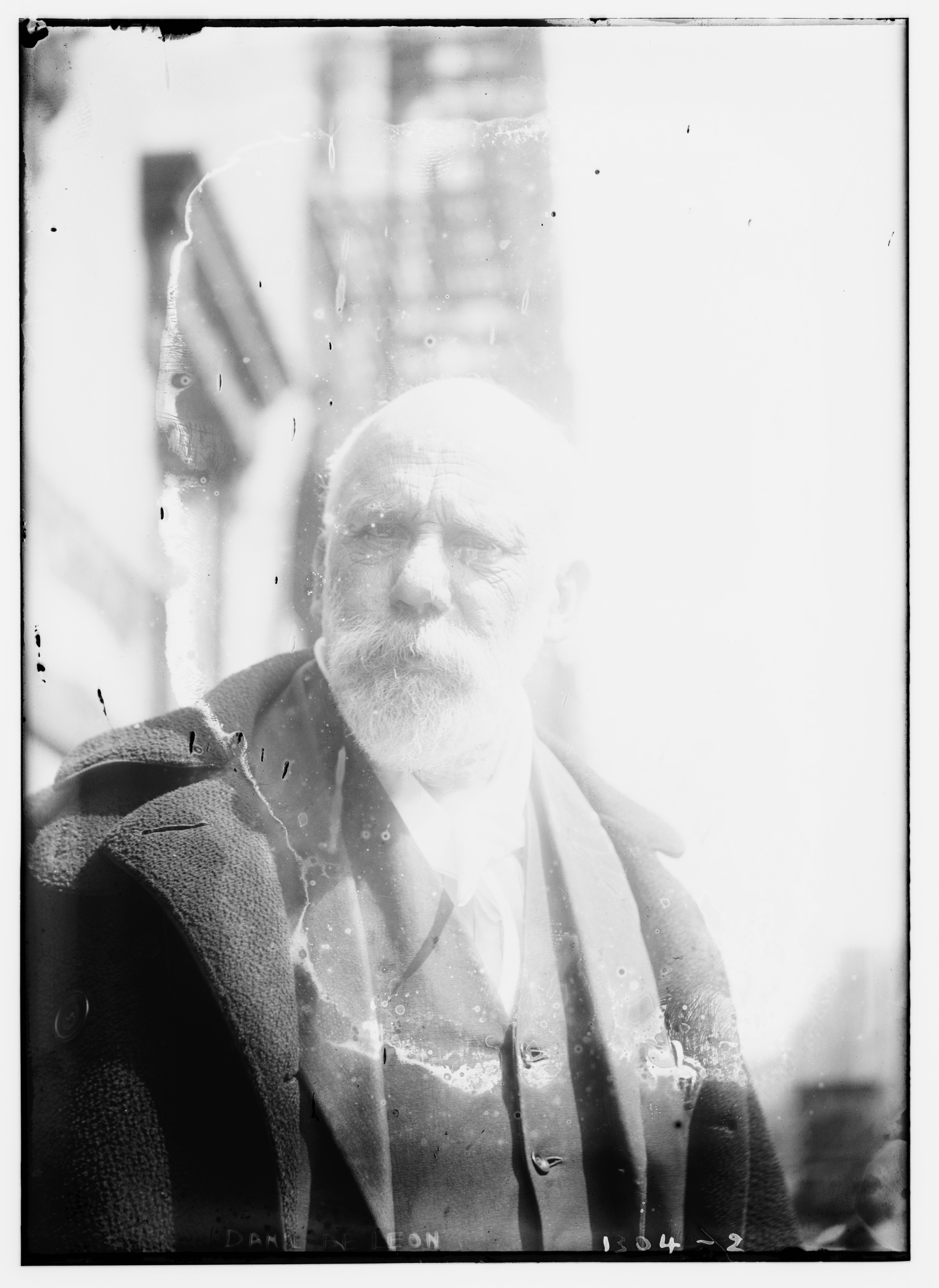
De Leon later in life

De Leon was formally expelled from the Chicago IWW after calling proponents of that organization "slum proletarians".

De Leon died on May 11, 1914, of septic endocarditis at Mount Sinai Hospital in Manhattan, New York. The Socialist Labor Party continues to advocate De Leon's ideas.

Daniel De Leon proved hugely influential to other socialists, also outside the US. For example, in the UK, a Socialist Labour Party was formed. De Leon's hopes for peaceful and bloodless revolution also influenced Antonio Gramsci's concept of passive revolution. George Seldes quotes Lenin saying on the fifth anniversary, November 7 1922 celebrations, "... What we have done in Russia is accept the De Leon interpretation of Marxism, that is what the Bolsheviki adopted in 1917."

== Electoral history ==
De Leon ran for various important positions in public office, but always won relatively very few votes. He ran in 1891 for governor of New York and only received 14,651 votes. He ran in 1893 for Secretary of State of New York and received 20,034 votes. He ran again in 1902 for governor and received 15,886 votes. He ran in 1903 for the New York Court of Appeals. He ran again in 1904 for Governor and received 8,976 votes.

== Works ==
- Reform or Revolution?, speech, 1896.
- What Means This Strike?, speech, 1898.
- Socialism vs Anarchism, speech, 1901.
- The Mysteries of the People, a series of 19 novels translated from Eugène Sue's text, 1904.
- Two Pages from Roman History
- The Burning Question of Trade Unionism
- Preamble of the IWW, later renamed The Socialist Reconstruction of Society.
- DeLeon Replies ... (short essay, 1904)

== Notes ==
Notes

Citations
