= Social-Democratic Workingmen's Party of North America =

Social-Democratic Workingmen's Party
- Abbreviation: SDWP; SDWPNA
- Founder: Adolph Strasser; Peter J. McGuire; Pyotr Lavrov
- Founded: 1874; 152 years ago
- Dissolved: July 15, 1876; 150 years ago
- Preceded by: International Workingmen's Association in America
- Merged into: Workingmen's Party of the United States
- Headquarters: New York City
- Ideology: Lassallism
- Political position: Left-wing

The Social-Democratic Workingmen's Party of North America (Note: Sometimes spelled as "Social Democratic Workingmen's Party".) (SDWP or SDWPNA) was a Lassallist socialist party.

== History ==
In 1868, German-speaking members of the International Workingmen's Association in America (IWA) in New York City create the Allgemeiner Deutscher Arbeiterverein (ADAV, General German Labor Association). Around this core, in 1874, dissident Lassallean members of the IWA split and created the Social-Democratic Workingmen's Party, shortly before the Philadelphia IWA collapsed. The SDWP claimed 1500 members, mostly German immigrants in New York City. 90% of its members were foreign-born workers. SDWP founders included Pyotr Lavrov and Adolph Strasser, who served as its executive secretary.

In the 1874 elections, the SDWP performed horribly. This encouraged Marxists within the organization to promote trade union membership over electoral participation, which they won at the 1875 convention. In turn, these results enabled the 1876 merger.

In 1876, the SDWP merged with three other socialist organizations to create the Workingmen's Party of the United States (WPUS), which would become the Socialist Labor Party of America (SLP).

Although the SDWP's platform contained no explicit reference to democracy, its successor the Socialist Labor Party would be the first US political party to demand initiatives as a plank in their party platform.

If dated from the formation of the ADAV, the SDWP was the second socialist party created in the world, after the General German Workers' Association of Ferdinand Lassalle.
