= Workingmen's Party of the United States =

1876–1877 political party in the United States

- Founded: July 19, 1876; 150 years ago
- Dissolved: December 26, 1877; 148 years ago
- Merger of: International Workingmen's Association in America; Workingmen's Party of Illinois; Social-Democratic Workingmen's Party of North America; Social Political Workingmen's Society of Cincinnati
- Succeeded by: Socialist Labor Party of America
- Headquarters: New York City
- Ideology: Lassallism (majority); Marxism (minority)
- Political position: Left-wing

The Workingmen's Party of the United States (WPUS), established in 1876, was one of the first Marxist-influenced political parties in the United States. It is remembered as the forerunner of the Socialist Labor Party of America.

== History ==
On July 15, 1876, ten Americans and one German convened in Philadelphia to announce the abolition of the General Council of the International Workingmen's Association. The Workingmen Party of the United States was formed on July 19, with the involvement of Friedrich Sorge. The foundation of the party was pushed by the Social-Democratic Workingmen's Party of North America, which broke away from the International Workingmen's Association in 1874. The WPUS was unable to field its own ticket in the 1876 presidential election and its members supported Peter Cooper and the Greenback Party instead.

The party, composed mostly of foreign-born laborers, represented a collection of socialist ideas from different groups, most notably followers of Karl Marx and Ferdinand Lassalle. The Lassallean faction believed in forming a socialist political party to advance their agenda incrementally through the electoral process. Marxian socialists, however, opposed to reformism believed in forming a socialist party as an instrument of organization of the proletariat to propagate consciousness leading to an ultimate revolutionary seizing of state power. They championed strong trade unions, strikes, and boycotts to develop class consciousness through class conflict.

The party at first had little influence over any politics in the United States on a national or local level. Much like the International Workingmen's Association in America before it, the WPUS was widely viewed as socialistic. However, during the railroad strikes during the summer of 1877, the party, led by the charismatic and well-spoken American Albert Parsons, showed some of its power by rallying support for the striking railroad workers.

As the WPUS formed, co-founder Joseph Patrick McDonnell stated, "The Trades Unions should be guided to renounce political action until a powerful labor party can resolve upon beginning it."

Although the WPUS was largely unsuccessful in the strikes it helped lead, on August 6, 1878 the party had managed to gain enough support to capture 5 out of 7 Louisville seats in the Kentucky state legislature. As news spread around the country of the success of the WPUS, more "Workingmen's Parties" formed in cities around the country, some chartered by the WPUS and some not.

The WPUS held its first national convention in December 1877, and was attended by 38 delegates. The Lassallean-led organization reorganized the party into the Socialist Labor Party of America.

== Notable members ==
- Charles J. Beerstecher, Delegate to the Second Constitutional Convention of California (1878–1879), California Rail Commissioner (1880–1883)
- Peter H. Clark, abolitionist
- Adolph Douai, educator and newspaper editor
- Anthony Fischer, German Workingmen's Club President, candidate for recorder of San Francisco (1879), attempted assassin of Charles J. Beerstecher
- Joseph Patrick McDonnell, labor leader
- Thomas J. Morgan, labor leader
- Albert Parsons, newspaper editor
- Lucy Parsons, labor leader
- Philip Van Patten, Corresponding Secretary of the Workingmen's Party (1876–1877)

== Works cited ==
- Ross, Jack (2015). The Socialist Party of America: A Complete History. University of Nebraska Press. ISBN 9781612344911.
