= Samuel Bernstein (disambiguation) =

Samuel Bernstein may refer to:

- Samuel Bernstein (born 1970), American screenwriter, director and author
- Samuel Bernstein (historian) (1898–1987), French historian
- Samuil Bernstein (1911–1997), Soviet linguist
- Sam Born (1891–1959), American businessman, candy maker, and inventor with the birth name Samuel Bernstein
- The Law Offices of Sam Bernstein
