= Paul Grottkau =

American journalist

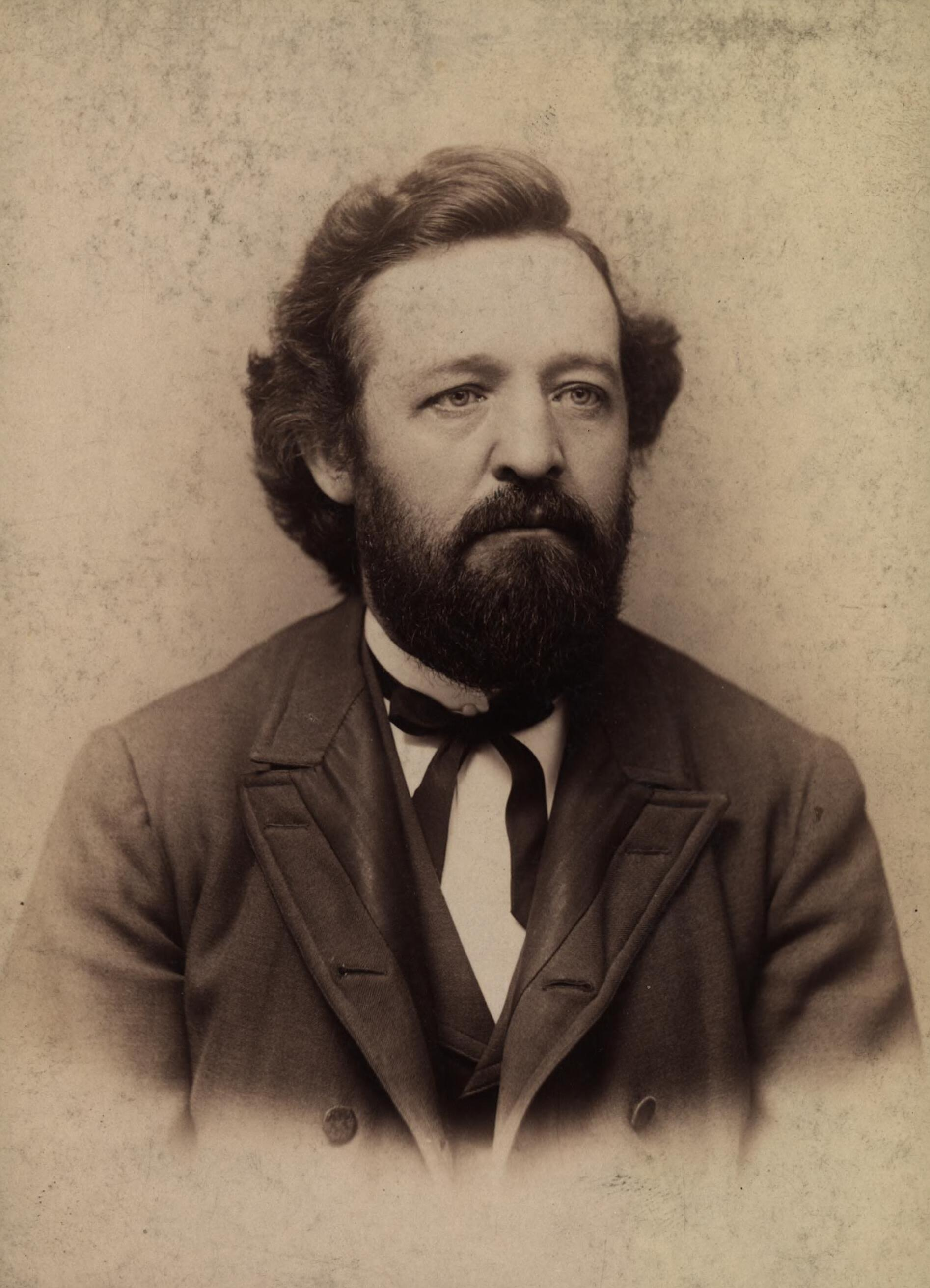
Portrait by Coller c. 1889–1898

Paul Grottkau (1846–1898) was a German-American socialist political activist and newspaper publisher. Grottkau is best remembered as an editor alongside Haymarket affair victim August Spies of the Chicagoer Arbeiter-Zeitung, one of the leading American radical newspapers of the decade of the 1880s. Later moving to Milwaukee, Grottkau became one of the leading luminaries of the socialist movement in Wisconsin.

== Biography ==
=== Early years ===
Paul Grottkau was born in Cottbus in 1846 and raised in Berlin, Prussia (now part of Germany), the son of a relatively prosperous noble family.

Grottkau was trained as an architect. Part of this training process involved Grottkau's learning the crafts of stonemasonry and building, activities which brought him into contract with members of the working class and first introduced him to socialist ideas.

Grottkau was initially highly influenced by the electorally-oriented ideas of Ferdinand Lassalle. By 1871 Grottkau was already a member of the General German Workingmen's Association and worked as an organizer for the burgeoning social democratic movement. He also served as editor of the official organ of the Bricklayers Union, Grundstein, and as editor of the radical Berliner Freie Presse.

This political activism placed Grottkau in the sights of the German police. Faced with arrest by the authorities under the Anti-Socialist Laws, Grottkau emigrated to the United States of America in 1878. A talented writer and orator, Grottkau found his way to the German émigré community in Chicago, where he immediately landed a job on the staff of the Social Democratic Chicagoer Arbeiter-Zeitung (Chicago Workers' News).

=== Chicago years ===
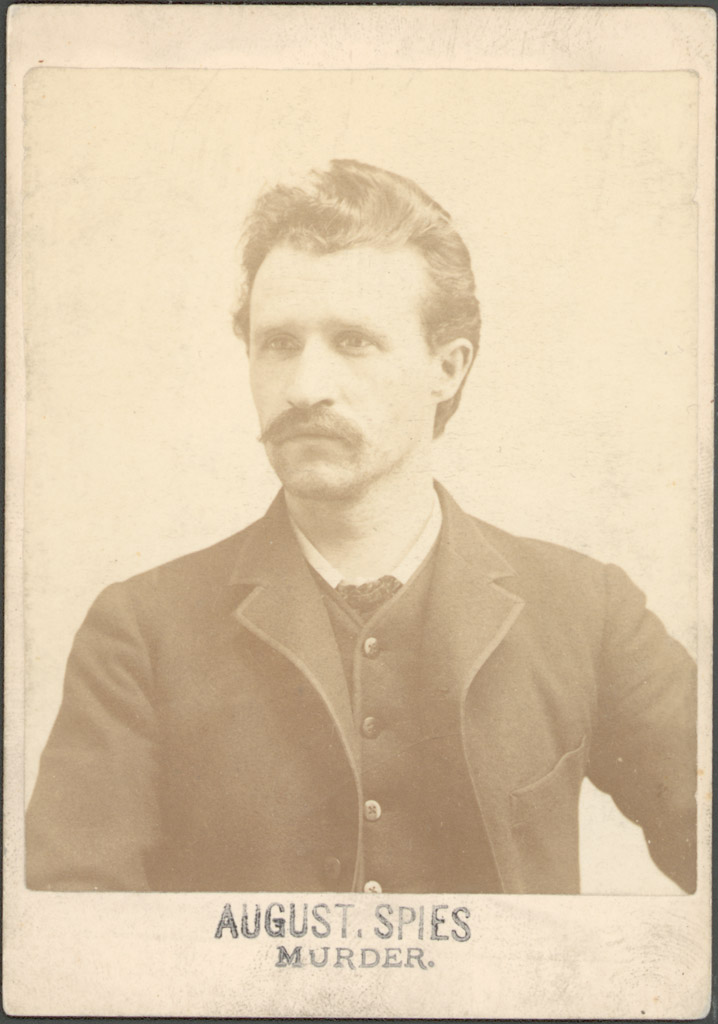
August Spies, Grottkau's editorial colleague on the staff of the Chicagoer Arbeiter-Zeitung and one of the "Haymarket Martyrs" of 1886.

It was not long before Grottkau was made editor of the daily Arbeiter-Zeitung, working closely alongside managing editor August Spies, a man later killed in a retaliatory execution in the aftermath of the May 1886 Haymarket bombing. Together with Spies and the American-born Albert Parsons, Grottkau emerged as one of the leaders of the radical movement in Chicago during the tumultuous end of the 1870s and first years of the 1880s.

During this interval the socialist movement of Chicago, centered around branches of the Socialist Labor Party of America (SLP), began to turn towards the ideas of armed insurrection and anarchism. Membership in the SLP plummeted, hitting a low water mark of just 1500 members in 1883, while the number of semi-independent anarchist "groups" multiplied and their membership rolls proliferated. Grottkau, like many others, was briefly swept up in this tide, and the Arbeiter-Zeitung was made a leading voice of American anarchism.

In the view of historian Howard H. Quint the reason for Grottkau's willingness to cast his lot with the so-called Social Revolutionaries (i.e. the Anarchists) in the early 1880s was related not to his affinity for their paramilitary auxiliary, units of the Lehr und Wehr Verein (Educational and Defensive Society), but rather due to a desire to change the personnel and tepid policy of the SLP, exemplified by the group's National Secretary, Philip Van Patten. While the meddling of Van Patten and the Detroit-based National Executive Committee of the SLP may have been Grottkau's primary objection, he nevertheless went all the way with the anarchist wing for a time, going so far as to himself briefly join the Lehr und Wehr Verein.

Grottkau ultimately broke with Spies, Parsons, and the Social Revolutionaries following the 1883 Pittsburgh Convention of the Revolutionary Socialist Party, which formally rejected socialist collectivism in favor of communist anarchism. In the aftermath the Socialist Revolutionaries went over to full-fledged anarchism, while the more moderate and electorally oriented elements such as Grottkau returned to the ranks of the SLP.

This new fissure was made eminently clear on the evening of May 24, 1884, when Grottkau appeared before a Chicago audience to debate the "Communist" position against Johann Most, a leading voice of the Anarchist movement. Morris Hillquit, one of the earliest historians of American socialism, recalled the affair:

It was a well-matched contest, the opponents being equally well-versed in the subject of discussion and both being fluent speakers and ready debaters. The discussion was very thoroughgoing and dealt with almost every phase of the subject. It was reported stenographically, published in book form, and widely circulated.

Another pioneer historian of American socialism, Frederic Heath, recalls the Most–Grottkau debate as pivotal in Grottkau's own personal story. According to his account:

Grottkau was now thoroughly enlisted against the Anarchists, realizing that they were inimical to the true interests of the proletarian movement. He fought valiantly for his view of the matter and wrote and spoke ardently, but the ground he had himself prepared was against him. He had a notable debate with Most in which he had decidedly the best of the argument and achieved an intellectual and argumentative victory; but not so thought the crowd, which was still filled with his previous teachings. A few weeks later he was forced to retire from the Arbeiter-Zeitung and to turn over the editorial pen to August Spies, the former business manager, a man more to Most's liking.

=== Milwaukee years ===
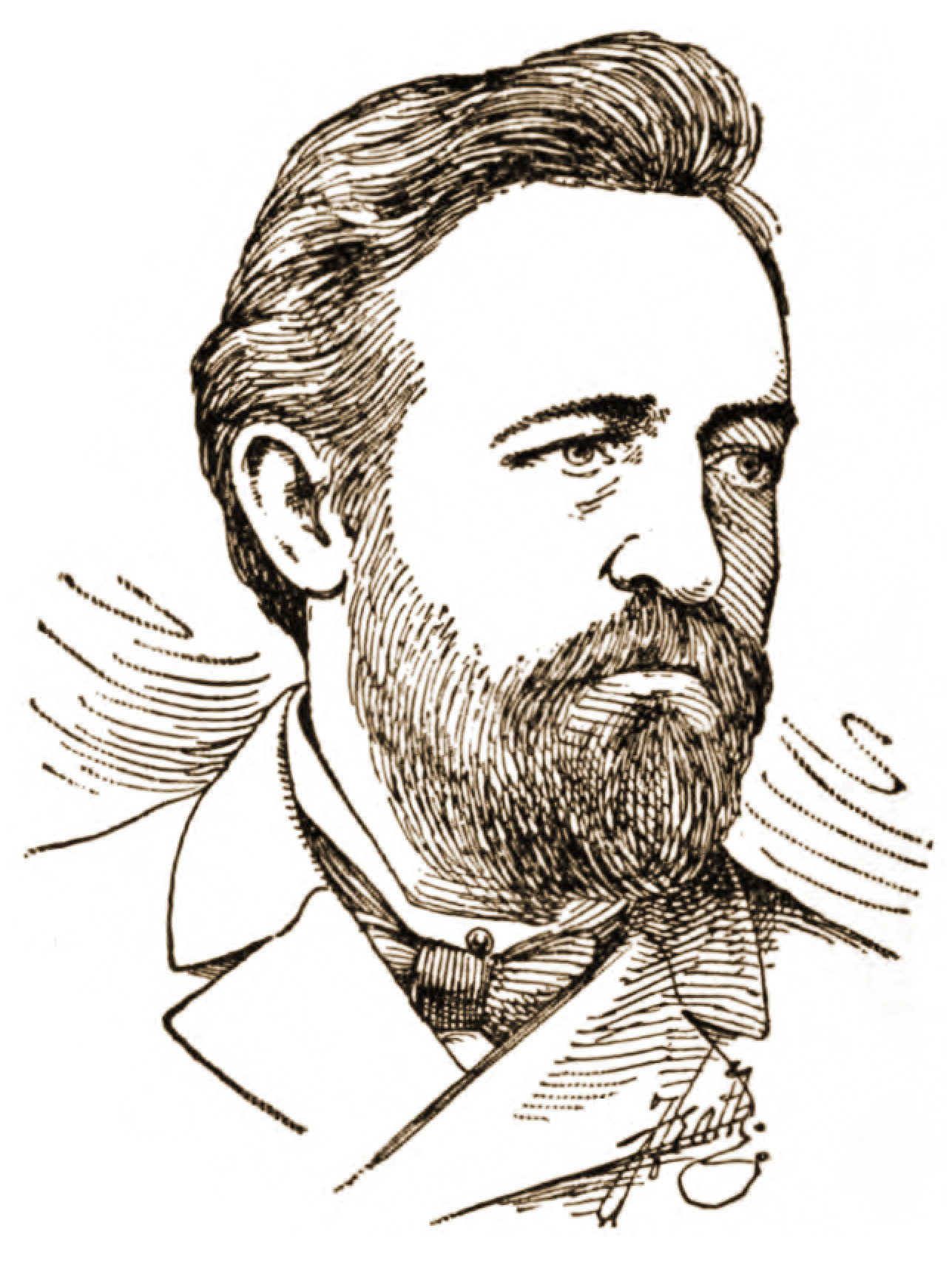
Radical publisher Paul Grottkau as he appeared c. 1886

Forced out of his editorial position in Chicago, Grottkau left the city to establish a paper of his own in Milwaukee, Wisconsin — the Milwaukee'r Arbeiter-Zeitung (Milwaukee Workers' News), issued three times a week. The paper commenced publication in 1886.

Grottkau became one of the leaders of the militant Milwaukee Central Labor Union, a group which, together with the Knights of Labor, coordinated a march in that city on May Day 1886 as a means of agitating for establishment of the 8-hour day. About 16,000 people participated in the May Day festivities, with several thousand marching in support of the Central Labor Union and the Knights of Labor. This gathering and march proceeded without incident, but the groundwork seems to have been laid for further activity.

On Monday, May 3, 1886, a general strike was called on Milwaukee's breweries, with as many as 1,000 men marching on Falk's Brewery in an effort to close the facility. Masses of brewery workers joined the protest and by that evening some 14,000 brewery workers were out on strike. That same afternoon several hundred Polish workers went to the railroad shops located in the Menomonee Valley to appeal to the 1400 railway shopmen working there to join the general strike. Most refused to quit work and law enforcement authorities were called upon to break up the group of strike agitators.

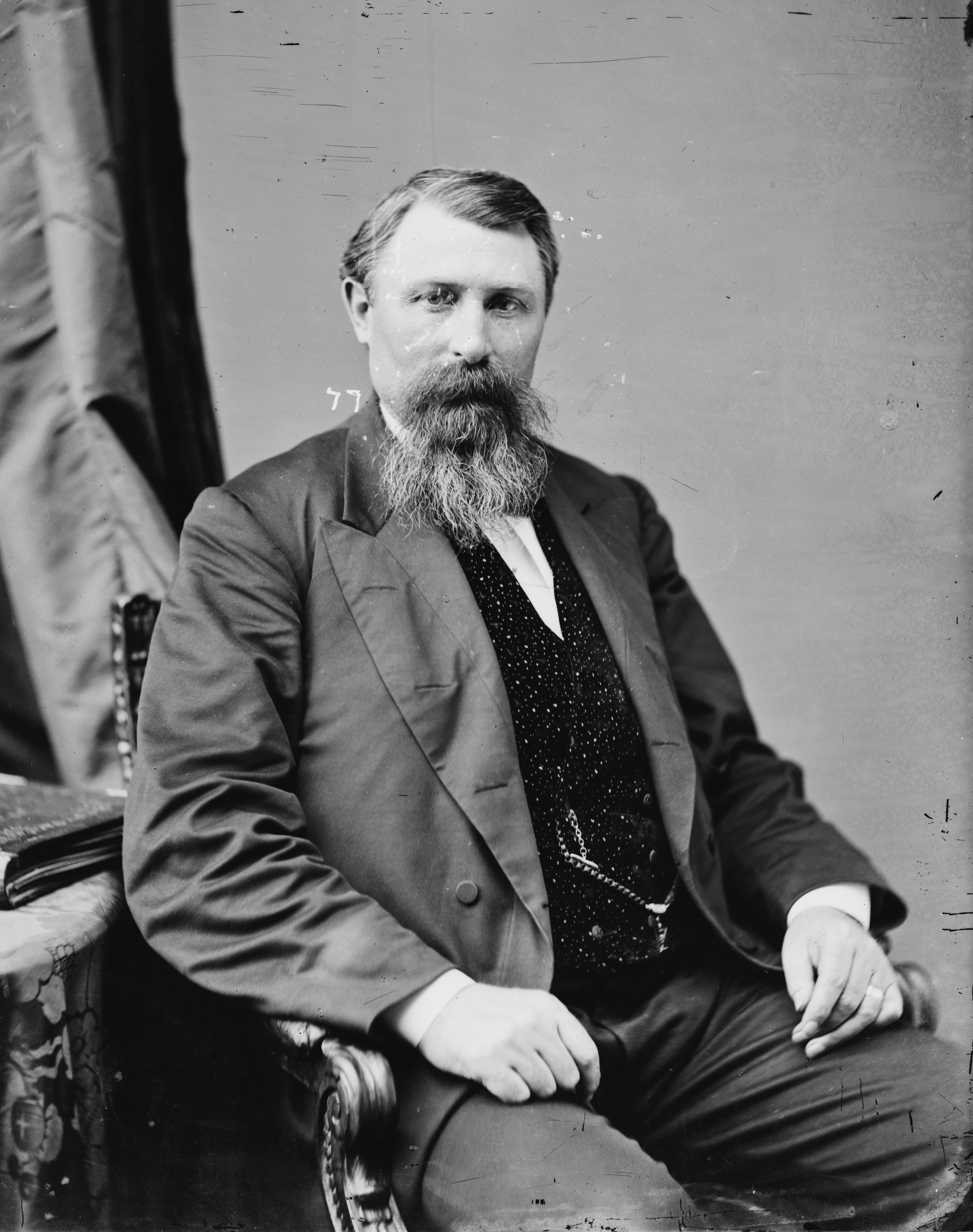
Gov. Jeremiah Rusk, who called out the National Guard on Milwaukee strikers early in May 1886. Grottkau would be imprisoned in the aftermath.

The Polish strike leaders proceeded to the Reliance Iron Works, where fire hoses were turned on them, with the effect that "the catapult power of the stream shot some of the men clear across the street." About 20 policemen appeared on the scene and began clubbing the wet strikers with their hickory nightsticks. Governor Jeremiah Rusk was notified by telegraph and several units of the National Guard were dispatched to Milwaukee from their station in Madison, arriving on the scene the next morning.

At about 7 am, some 600 or 700 men, armed with clubs, assembled and began to march on the steel rolling mills located in the Bay View area of the city.

The protest degenerated into violence, with the so-called "reign of terror" recalled by one contemporary adherent of law and order:

Idle workmen paraded the streets; men willing to work were urged to join the demonstration and in many cases compelled to do so; crowds armed with paving blocks, billets, and other improvised weapons of the street overturned hucksters' stands, invaded manufacturing establishments, and even attacked them. As the riotous proceedings grew to large proportions and the city seemed about to be stretched at the mercy of a mob, a deadly fire from the rifles of state militiamen was poured into a crowd of Polish workmen and ended the lawlessness which had threatened to grow beyond control.

The same historian noted that despite the firing of shots, "not one person was wounded in the volley," noting:

Many of the mob, as they saw the rifles aimed, threw themselves flat upon the ground, others sought shelter behind woodpiles and telegraph posts and fences. Notwithstanding, it seemed providential that the ground was not strewn with dead and dying. Many buildings in range of the rifles were perforated with bullets ...

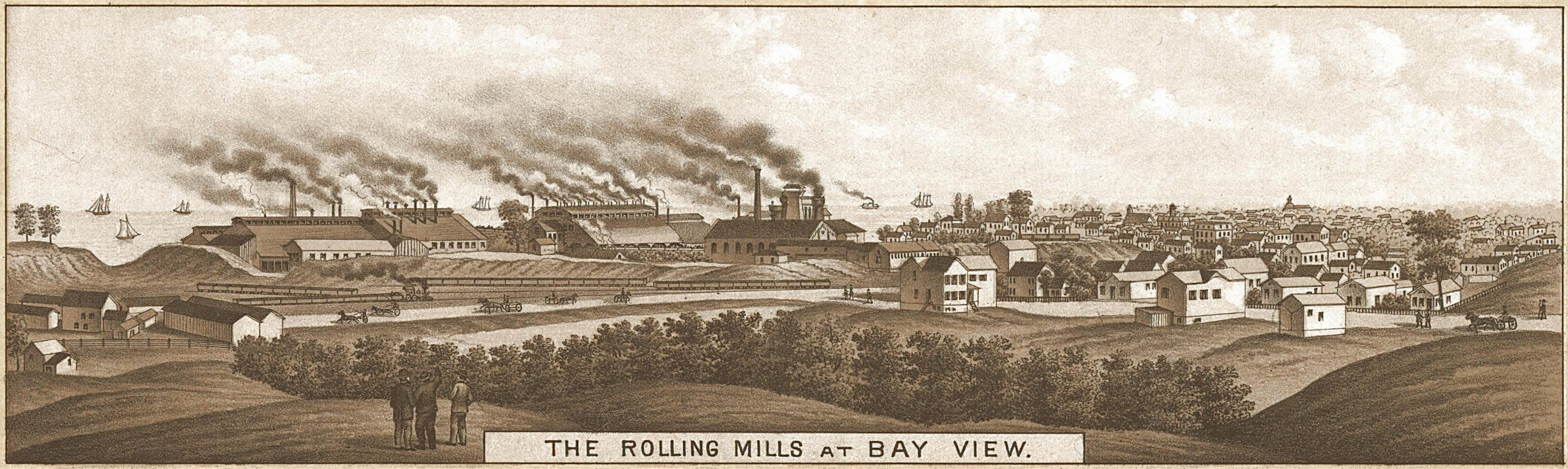
Rolling Mills of the Milwaukee Iron Company at Bay View, objective of strikers involved in the May 1886 Bay View Massacre, a disturbance for which Grottkau was imprisoned.

In the afternoon of Wednesday, May 5, 1886, strikers again assembled to march on the company town of Bay View. This time, new orders had been issued to the members of the National Guard by Governor Rusk — that, in the event of the repeat of mob tactics, the guardsmen should this time shoot to kill. Guardsmen blocked the road. When the approaching strikers were 1000 yards away, commanding officer Major George P. Traeumer gave the command to fire and a hail of bullets was unleashed on the crowd. The number wounded will never be known, having been carried away by the fleeing crowd, but eight people died in what is today remembered as the Bay View Massacre. Included among these was an old man who had been feeding chickens in his yard and a young schoolboy.

In the aftermath Paul Grottkau was arrested, ostensibly as the perpetrator of the strike, and sentenced to one year in prison. Grottkau served only six weeks of this sentence before being released, during which time he ran a campaign in an effort to become the next Mayor of Milwaukee.

Grottkau would continue to edit the Milwaukee'r Arbeiter-Zeitung until 1888, briefly moving back to Chicago following the publication's sale to again work on the paper's Chicago namesake.

=== Later years ===
Grottkau moved to San Francisco, California in 1889. There he became editor of the California Arbeiterzeitung, a short-lived publication.

In 1890 Grottkau was named as a traveling organizer by the Executive Council of the American Federation of Labor, assigned the task of touring the country on behalf of the Federation's campaign for the 8-hour day.

In January 1893 Grottkau's old newspaper, the Arbeiter-Zeitung, was sold to a young Jewish schoolteacher of Austrian birth, Victor L. Berger, who relaunched the publication as the Wisconsin Vorwärts ('Wisconsin Forward'). This would be the first of several publication's in Berger's portfolio, which would ultimately prove to be the stepping-stone to the socialist publisher's election to United States Congress in the fall of 1910.

During his final year of life Grottkau joined the Social Democracy of America, a political forerunner of the Socialist Party of America.

=== Death and legacy ===
In the spring of 1898, Grottkau made a speaking tour on behalf of the Social Democracy, visiting the cities of Buffalo, Cleveland, and Detroit. During this trip Grottkau contracted pneumonia, which led to his hospitalization at St. Joseph's Hospital in Milwaukee on May 30. Grottkau's condition continued to deteriorate and he succumbed to the effects of the illness in the evening of June 3, 1898.

A funeral was held in Milwaukee on June 5, 1898, which was addressed by Victor L. Berger in German as well as by other prominent Milwaukee labor and political leaders. Grottkau's body was interred at Forest Home Cemetery in Milwaukee.

== Works ==
- Unterhaltendes in 12 Briefen zusammengestellt an die Mitglieder des Allgemeinen deutschen Maurer- und Steinhauer-Vereins und Solche, die es werden wollen. Verfaßt und hrsg. im Auftrage des Allgemeinen deutschen Maurer-Vereins. Berlin 1873, 108 pp.
- Die rothe Laterne. Humoristisches Organ zur Beleuchtung politischer und sozialer Schattenseiten. Humoristisch-satirische Wahlzeitung aus den Wahlkämpfen 1874. Editor: Paul Grottkau. Schoenfeld & Baumgarten, Berlin 1874
- Chicagoer Arbeiter-Zeitung. Unabhängiges Organ für die Interessen des Volkes. Organ der internationalen Vereinigung des arbeitenden Volkes. Editor: Paul Grottkau. July, 14th 1880 to September 1884
- Vorbote. Hrsg. Internationale Vereinigung des arbeitenden Volkes. Redaktion: Paul Grottkau vom 1. Juli 1882 bis 4. Mai 1886. Deutschsprechende Sektion des S.A.P. Chicago
- Karl Marx todt! In: Chicagoer-Arbeiter-Zeitung. Chicago, 16. März 1883
- Karl Marx todt! In: Vorbote, Chicago. Nr. 12, 24. März 1883 (printed in: Ihre Namen Leben durch die Jahrhunderte fort. Kondolenzen und Nekrologe zum Tode von Karl Marx und Friedrich Engels. Dietz Verlag, Berlin 1983, p. 209-211.)
- Zum Kongress der Sozialisten Nord-Amerikas. In: Freiheit. Organ der Revolutionären Sozialisten. Justus H. Schwab, New York. 1883. V. Jg., Nr. 32 August, 11th. August 1883
- Anarchismus Oder Communismus?, Geführt von Paul Grottkau und Johann Most am 24 Mai 1884 in Chicago. Das Central-Comite der Chicagoer Gruppen der IAA, Office der "Chicagoer Arbeiter-Zeitung" und der "Verbote". Chicago 1884.
- Illinois Volkszeitung. Edited by Paul Grottkau and Julius Vahlteich. 1886
- Milwaukee Arbeiterzeitung. Editor Paul Grottkau. 1888
