= Philip Van Patten =

American architect (1852–1918)

Van Patten c. late 1870s

Simon Philip Van Patten (February 22, 1852 – September 20, 1918) was an American socialist political activist prominent during the latter half of the 1870s and the first half of the 1880s. Van Patten is best remembered for being named the first Corresponding Secretary of the Workingmen's Party of the United States in 1876 and for heading it and its successor organization, the Socialist Labor Party of America, for the next six years. In 1883 Van Patten mysteriously disappeared, with his friends reporting him as a potential suicide to law enforcement authorities. He later turned up as a government employee, however, having abandoned radical politics in favor of stable employment.

== Biography ==
=== Early years ===
Simon Philip Van Patten was born February 22, 1852, in Georgetown, Washington, D.C., in the United States, the son of ethnic Dutch heritage. One early socialist historian characterized Van Patten as "an American of good family, with an excellent education." According to U.S. Census data, his father was born in New York state and his mother in Pennsylvania. His father was a renowned naturalist who was a Dutch-speaking confidant of President Martin Van Buren. Philip Van Patten spent much of his childhood in Costa Rica.

At the age of 21, Philip Van Patten rented a room without a bath or kitchen on the West Side of Chicago, and worked as an architectural draftsman downtown. He arrived as the boom of building construction necessitated by the great Chicago fire had gone bust due to a national financial crisis. From 1875 through 1876, Van Patten supplemented his income by rendering buildings or drawing maps as an insurance surveyor.

=== Political career ===
According to the recollection of pioneer Chicago Socialist George A. Schilling, Philip Van Patten seems to have become involved in the radical politics in about 1875, joining John McAuliffe and John Eckford as among the first group of English-speaking Socialists in that city. Other leading English-speaking Chicago socialists in this period, who had organized themselves as part of the Social Democratic Party of North America (SDP), included Schilling himself, Thomas J. Morgan, John Paulson, and Albert R. Parsons. Of this group, Van Patten does not seem to have been a gifted orator, for Schilling recalls that "at this time A.R. Parsons and John McAuliffe were the only ones capable of expounding in public the principles of the party in the English language." The official organ of this group was a weekly newspaper published in New York City called The Socialist.

In July 1876 the SDP joined with trade union-oriented groups loyal to the First International at a Unity Congress to establish the Workingmen's Party of the United States. The name of The Socialist was changed to The Labor Standard and retained as the official English language voice of the organization, with a new editor named to take charge of the publication. Chicago was named as the seat of the Executive Committee of this new organization and it was this Chicago committee that named Philip Van Patten as the Corresponding Secretary of the new organization.

Chosen to be the Party's leader at the age of 24, Van Patten continued to lead the party until 1883. Van Patten attributed his own rise to Party leadership to "the difficulty in getting anyone who could write correct English," due to the fact that the party consisted largely of German immigrants.

=== The railway strike of 1877 ===
A great railroad strike erupted in the Eastern United States in 1877, spreading West to the working class center of Chicago, where it was conducted directly by the National Executive Committee of the NEC. Chief among the leaders of this Chicago organization were National Secretary Philip Van Patten, head of the Chicago City Committee, George A. Schilling, and English-language newspaper editor Albert R. Parsons.

The cause of this strike was a severe economic depression which had begun as the Panic of 1873 and which continued uninterrupted through 1877. One of the hardest-hit sectors of the American economy was the railroad industry, which had been the object of a speculative bubble of massive investment between 1867 and 1877. As one historian has observed, thousands of miles of costly railroads had been constructed in this period "on the mere expectation of the future development of the country, and without reference to the actual requirements of traffic." The so-called "Long Depression" of 1873 had seen a particularly severe contraction in the railroad sector, with wages of railroad workers slashed by an average of approximately 25 percent by 1877. In June 1877 another cut of 10 percent was announced by several major rail lines and strikes erupted in response.

On July 21 the Workingmen's Party held two giant mass meetings in support of the strikers — an outdoor meeting conducted in German and an indoor session at Stack's Hall in English. At these sessions the Workingmen's Party called for the nationalization of the railroads and for the establishment of an 8-hour day throughout America.

A huge torchlight march took place the next night, attended by an estimated 15,000 Chicagoans. This rally marked the eve of the escalation of the strike, as on July 23 striking workers on the Michigan Central Railroad marched to the shops of the B & O and the Illinois Central to call out those workers to join the strike for higher wages. Machine shops, factories, and mills were swept up in the strike wave. Employers and law enforcement authorities launched an offensive of their own, bringing about the firing of Workingmen's Party leader Albert Parsons from his job as a printer, and breaking up a WP meeting attended by 5,000 striking workers, family members and sympathizers through the copious use of nightsticks.

Philip Van Patten was severely beaten during the strike, narrowly escaping serious or fatal injury. Van Patten was arrested as a strike leader, taken to police headquarters, and threatened with hanging — as had been Parsons earlier in the day. Violence was indeed escalated on July 24, when police fired upon strikers at the railroad yards, killing 3 and wounding at least 8 others; they used their clubs again later in the day to break up a Workingmen's Party rally. Violence continued for the rest of the week, with a final death toll recorded of at least 18 workers in the successful crushing of the Chicago strike.

=== Chicago in the 1870s ===
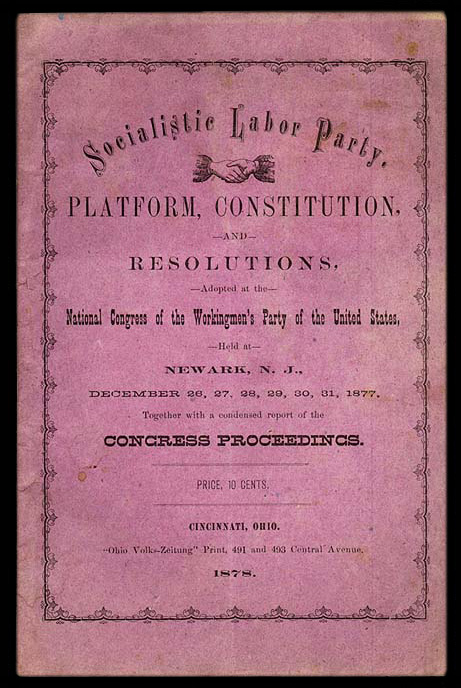
Cover of the pamphlet of stenographic proceedings of the 1877 "National Congress" which re-elected Philip Van Patten Secretary of the SLP.

The headquarters city of the Socialist Labor Party moved several times in its early years and Philip Van Patten followed it. The 1st National Congress of the organization, held in Newark, New Jersey, in December 1877, moved the NEC and party headquarters to Cincinnati, Ohio, at the time the site of a large and active "Section" of the party. Van Patten dutifully relocated there in mid-February 1878.

By the time the NEC had established itself in that city in March 1878 factionalism and discouragement had largely disrupted the local organization, however, a situation exacerbated by the failure of the party's Cincinnati-based daily, the Ohio Volkszeitung, in September of that year. Even before the next convention of the SLP at the end of 1879, Secretary Van Patten and party headquarters had moved to Detroit, Michigan, with a new NEC elected by that thriving Section.

Controversy was soon to erupt, however, pitting the electoral politics-oriented Van Patten and the Detroit NEC against the radical activities of Section Chicago, who were sliding towards direct action and decentralization that were part of a growing anarchist ideology.

One unintended consequence resulting from the smashing of the 1877 Chicago railway strike with armed force was a radicalization of the labor movement in that city. As early as 1875 there had been established in Chicago a workers' militia known as the Lehr und Wehr Verein (Education and Defense Society) — a paramilitary organization which declared itself armed and ready to defend the working class against manifestations of state violence against striking workers and their political activities. These units of armed workmen drilled in public with rifles in hand, marching under the red flag, amidst public pronouncements that workers' militia groups would henceforth come to the aid of striking workers against the state militia in the event of a strike.

By May and June 1878, the popular press was filled with sensational stories positing an armed insurrection to seize the state by these groups. Van Patten and the Detroit NEC of the SLP which he headed were outspoken opponents of the Lehr und Wehr Verein, instead advocating the use of electoral methods to win control of the state by the workers movement. In response to the June 1878 press frenzy, Van Patten published a document "denying the false reports that our Sections were arming, and informing the public that our party, as a party, would not be responsible for any violations of law by its members."

This position placed Van Patten in opposition to the Chicago organization, including the staffs of the daily Chicagoer Arbeiter Zeitung and the weekly Vorbote, which ridiculed the NEC mercilessly. The NEC responded with a public statement made to the press disavowing allegations that the Socialist Labor Party was arming and advising all party members to disassociate themselves from armed militia groups. Section Chicago was specifically requested to exclude the Lehr und Weir Verein from a scheduled public demonstration which was in the offing.

Van Patten recalled:

This declaration was received by the Chicago section with the most bitter contempt. The advice was disregarded and the armed organization welcomed to the procession. The editor of the Arbeiter Zeitung and Vorbote (Paul Grottkau), not satisfied with this, attempted to create a permanent breach in our party by printing thousands of extra papers filled with abuse of our Committee, ignoring all explanations showing the good intentions which had actuated us, so as to maintain the honor of the Party we repudiated the Vorbote as our organ until such time as its tone should be corrected.

Called upon to decide the question, the 2nd National Convention of the SLP, held in Allegheny City, Pennsylvania, at the end of 1879 narrowly approved after heated debate a resolution of censure of the actions of Van Patten and the NEC for intervening in the local affairs of Section Chicago. This was not held against Van Patten personally, however, and he was returned as National Secretary by the convention, which was ultimately controlled by the moderate rather than the radical wing of the party.

=== Decline of the SLP ===
During this interval, Van Patten fulfilled a dual Secretarial role, not just heading the SLP but also serving as Secretary of the governing General Executive Board of the Noble and Holy Order of the Knights of Labor, an early trade union federation largely composed of ethnic Irish and English members. In this organization Van Patten was a voice which advocated closer relations between the Knights and the existing radical, ethnic German-dominated local unions of the Chicago Central Labor Union (CLU), from which anti-Socialist unionists and the Knights had seceded in 1880. Close relations and joint parades, picnics, and demonstrations of the CLU and the Knights after 1881 were largely a product of Van Patten's efforts in this regard.

Van Patten and his electorally-oriented comrades sought to field a socialist candidate in the Presidential election of 1880, or to at least support an alternative to the so-called "old party" candidates that was not inimical to the Socialist Labor Party's goals. To this end, Van Patten and several other members of the SLP traveled to the national convention of the Greenback Party, which ultimately nominated James B. Weaver for the Presidency, in an attempt to "socialize" that party's platform. Despite their failure to materially influence the program of the Greenbackers, Van Patten and his associates requested that SLP members support the Greenback Party ticket in the fall campaign — an attitude which further deepened the division between the NEC and the radical trade unionists of Section Chicago.

Fighting over the direction of the SLP and the radical workers' movement would remain a matter of bitter debate over the next several years, with the ideas of direct action and armed insurrection steadily gaining momentum throughout the first half of the 1880s. Membership in the Socialist Labor Party plummeted during this battle. Although the total size of the organization was not stated at the 1879 Convention of the SLP, a subsequent report submitted by New York City activist P.J. McGuire to the 1881 Convention of the Second International claimed a membership of just 2,500 for the American organization — a total disputed by Adolph Strasser, who estimated the count at just 1,500.

The departure of the left wing of the SLP to the Anarchist movement left the party apparatus, such as it was, in the hands of the electorally-oriented moderates. The December 1881 3rd National Convention of the organization, held in New York City, was attended by a mere 17 delegates, mostly from New York City itself. The convention made New York the headquarters city for the organization and returned Philip Van Patten as National Secretary. Van Patten remarked to a correspondent at the time that his re-election related to the party's "difficulty in getting anyone who could write correct English" and was made possible by the absence at the convention of what he called the "thick-headed, dyspeptic element."

In 1883, Van Patten was named as a prospective editor of a new labor newspaper that had been launched in New York City called Voice of the People. Van Patten was charged with attempting to raise funding to take the publication from weekly to daily status. He was unable to achieve this, however. Together with the seeming disintegration of the SLP as an electoral force, this general situation was said to have left Van Patten "despondent and dejected."

In the middle of April 1883, Van Patten crated up all his books and papers and shipped them away to an unknown destination from his lodgings in Manhattan.

=== Government career ===
On April 22, 1883, friends of Van Patten called New York City police authorities to report him missing. Van Patten had suddenly disappeared, leaving behind a letter announcing his plan to commit suicide. This letter was later revealed as a part of a plan to divert attention from Van Patten's decision to abandon the socialist movement in favor of government employment, however.

Morris Hillquit, a pioneer historian of the American radicalism, considered Van Patten's loss after a decade of complete dedication to the cause a "hard blow to the organized socialist movement of this country," writing;

He was a man of much enthusiasm and devotion, but by no means a strong and popular leader. It was not so much the loss of his personality as the moral effect of his retreat that reflected a deep discouragement on the socialist movement.

=== Later life, death, and legacy ===
Sometime in the 1890s Philip Van Patten reemerged as a prominent architect in Hot Springs, Arkansas.

Van Patten died on September 20, 1918, in Hot Springs. Only the Little Rock Sentinel-Record newspaper noted his passing, with a one paragraph obituary eulogizing Philip Van Patten as "one of the leading architects of the city," an "early settler" of Hot Springs and an active member of the Knights of Pythias. He was 66 years old at the time of his death.

== Works ==
- "Workingmen’s Party of the United States: Address of the Executive. With Conrad Pfeiffer. The Labor Standard [New York], vol. 1, no. 21 (Sept. 2, 1876), pg. 1.
- "Report of Proceedings of the Executive Committee of the Workingmen’s Party of the US: Chicago — August 6, 8, 11, 18, 1876." The Labor Standard [New York], vol. 1, no. 21 (Sept. 2, 1876), pg. 4.
- "Workingmen’s Party of the United States: To the Workingmen of All Countries." With Conrad Pfeiffer. The Labor Standard [New York], vol. 1, no. 23 (Sept. 16, 1876), pg. 1.
- "Report of the NEC to the 2nd National Convention of the Socialist Labor Party of America: Allegheny City, Pennsylvania — Dec. 26, 1879," Published in Proceedings of the National Convention of the Socialistic Labor Party Held at Turner Hall, Allegheny City, Pennsylvania, Commencing Dec. 26th, 1879. Detroit: National Executive Committee of the Socialistic Labor Party, 1880; pp. 5–17.
- "The National Executive Committee to All Members and Friends of the Party," Bulletin of the Social Labor Movement," vol. 1, no. 14 (Dec. 1880-Jan. 1881), pg. 1.
