= First International in the United States =

International Workingmen's Association
- Abbreviation: IWA
- Founded: 1864; 162 years ago
- Dissolved: 1876; 150 years ago
- Succeeded by: Workingmen's Party of the United States; Second International
- Ideology: Socialism; Factions; Marxism; Lassallism; Bakuninism
- Political position: Left-wing to Far-left
- International affiliation: International Workingmen's Association

The International Workingmen's Association (IWA) in the United States of America took the form of a loose network of about 35 frequently discordant local "sections," each professing allegiance to the London-based IWA, commonly known as the "First International." These sections were divided geographically and by the language spoken by their members, frequently new immigrants to America, including those who spoke German, French, Czech, as well as Irish and "American" English-language groups.

The peak membership of the various sections of the International Workingmen's Association in the United States has been variously estimated in the vicinity of 4,000 to 5,000.

== Organizational history ==
=== Background ===
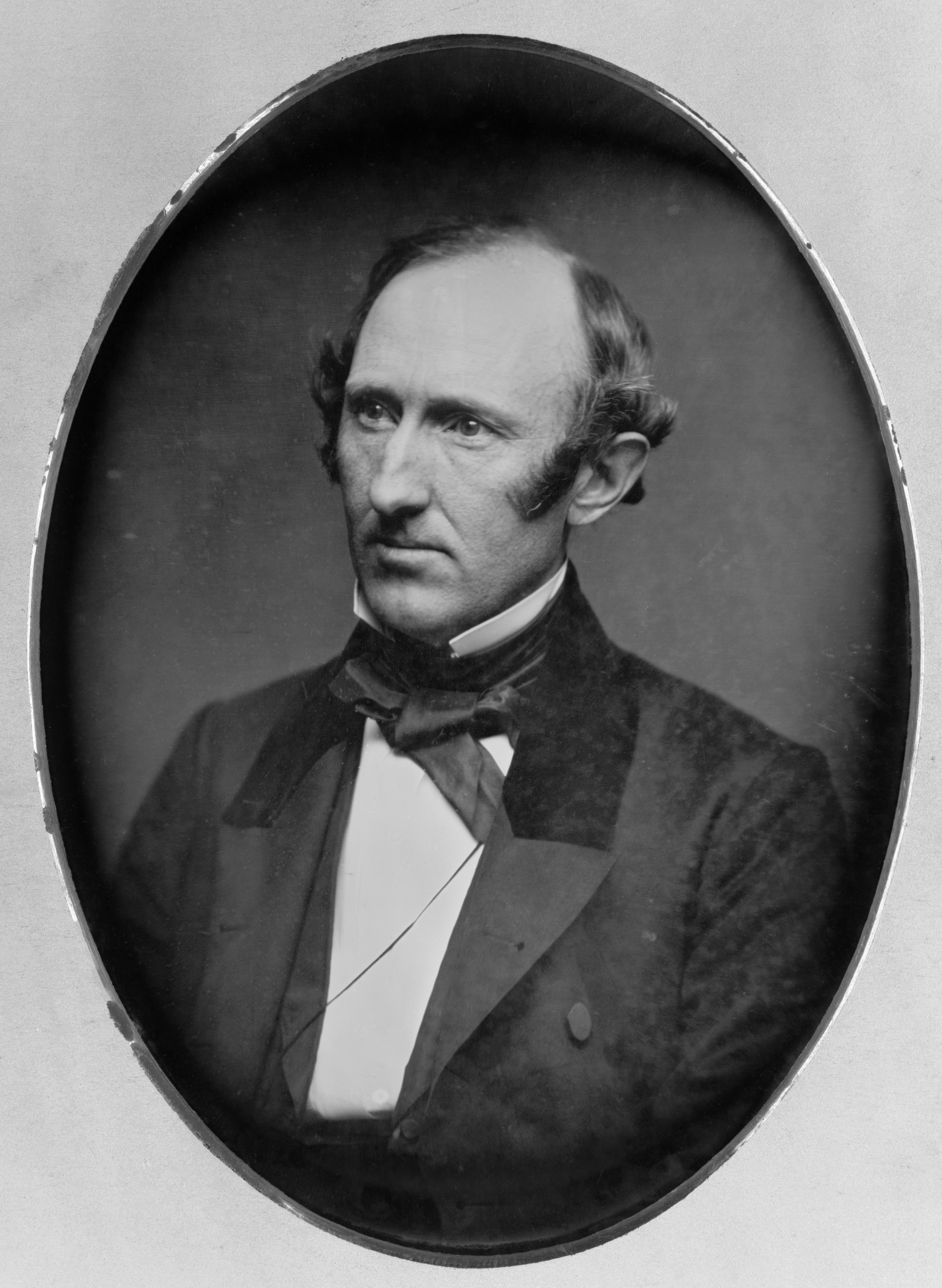
Abolitionist Wendell Phillips was an early supporter of the IWA and the Paris Commune of 1871, an event which boosted that organization in America.

The International Workingmen's Association (IWA), commonly known as the First International, was established in London in 1864. The organization was initially strictly European in composition, including prominently English, French, German, Polish, and Italian labor leaders and political activists.

The International made its way to American soil in 1866 when Italian socialist Cesare Orsini, brother of an attempted assassin of Napoleon III, arrived in the United States in 1866 and attempted to organize an American section. Orsini managed to win the support of a number of a handful of émigré socialists in New York City, in addition to gaining a sympathetic hearing from several prominent political figures, including newspaper editor Horace Greeley, abolitionist orator Wendell Phillips, and radical Republican Senator Charles Sumner.

At the time of its establishment, the International was far from a revolutionary organization, seeking rather to advance the cause of labor through international cooperation of organized workers around a general program based upon the notions of liberty and justice. This somewhat tender trade unionist perspective was not universal among its members, however, as from the outset it gained the participation of German émigrés Karl Marx and Frederick Engels and many of their co-thinkers, for whom the purpose of the IWA were not the modest goals of raising wages, lowering working hours, and liberalizing election law through international cooperation, but rather the construction of an international organization as a tool for the winning of state power from the bourgeoisie.

In this era of imperfect transatlantic communications the message of the IWA was spread through personal communication, with parallel networks emerging between Karl Marx and his associates on the one hand and the official "American Corresponding Secretary" of the General Council of the IWA in London. In effect these parallel channels of communication replicated the factional divisions of the European organization. The tension between labor-reformist and revolutionary visions of the IWA would find reflection in the factional warfare within the organization in America. Andrew Cameron was a delegate of the National Labor Union who attended the Basle Congress (1869).

=== Early New York movement ===
In December 1867 a first step towards formal organization on behalf of the International took place in New York City when a call was issued for a meeting to be held the next month at the Germania Assembly Rooms, located in the city's Bowery district. Those calling the meeting were activists in the German-American labor movement. This event was held successfully and served as the foundation convention for an independent political party known as the Social Party of New York and Vicinity.

The Social Party adopted a platform which incorporated elements both of the program of the International as well as that of the fledgling National Labor Union (NLU) established less than two years earlier by William H. Sylvis. The group elected parallel Executive Boards, one each for its German-speaking and English-speaking membership. These two executive bodies cooperated in naming and running a ticket for city political office in the election of 1868. This effort was met with voter apathy, however, and the first campaign of the Social Party of New York also proved to be its last.

Friedrich Sorge (1828-1906), a friend and correspondent of Karl Marx, was the leading figure in Section No. 1 of New York, IWA.

Following the 1868 electoral failure, the Social Party of New York dissolved and its leading German-speaking members established a new organization called the Allgemeiner Deutscher Arbeiterverein (General German Workers' Association). This group had an unabashed international socialist orientation and was later recalled by Friedrich Sorge to have consisted "almost exclusively" of "plain wage-workers of every possible trade."

In February 1869, shortly after its formation, the Allgemeiner Deutscher Arbeiterverein was admitted to the National Labor Union as "Labor Union No. 5 of New York." The group sent delegates to the 1869 and 1870 national conventions of the NLU, but withdrew from the organization immediately after the 1870 conclave.

=== Section 1 ===
In the fall of 1869, the Allgemeiner Deutscher Arbeiterverein, also known as Labor Union No. 5 of New York, affiliated as a group with the International Workingmen's Association, becoming "Section No. 1 of New York." The group would not only become the bulwark of the International in America, but it would ultimately outlive the International itself, terminating only in 1874, two years after the death of the International.

Section 1 maintained contacts with various trade unions in New York City and around the country and was instrumental in helping to establish new sections of the International. Early in 1870 a French-speaking section was established in New York City, with a Czech-speaking section following the fall of that same year.

Communication between the executive of the International in London and the American movement was fragmented, with American sections speaking one or another language communicating directly with corresponding secretaries in that language in London — a situation which was deemed as contributing to factional rivalry and personal animosity. It was deemed desirable that a single Central Committee should be established in the United States to smooth the transmission of official communications to and from London. On October 2, 1870, a joint meeting of the German and French sections of New York City voted to accept the London Council's plan.

This was followed in December 1870 by the formal launch of the "Central Committee of the International Workingmen's Association for North America" by the German, French, and Czech sections. Within six months this body would include representatives of 10 sections of the International, including 8 from New York City and 2 from Chicago. This would be the formal governing body of the IWA in America.

=== Growth of the IWA in America ===
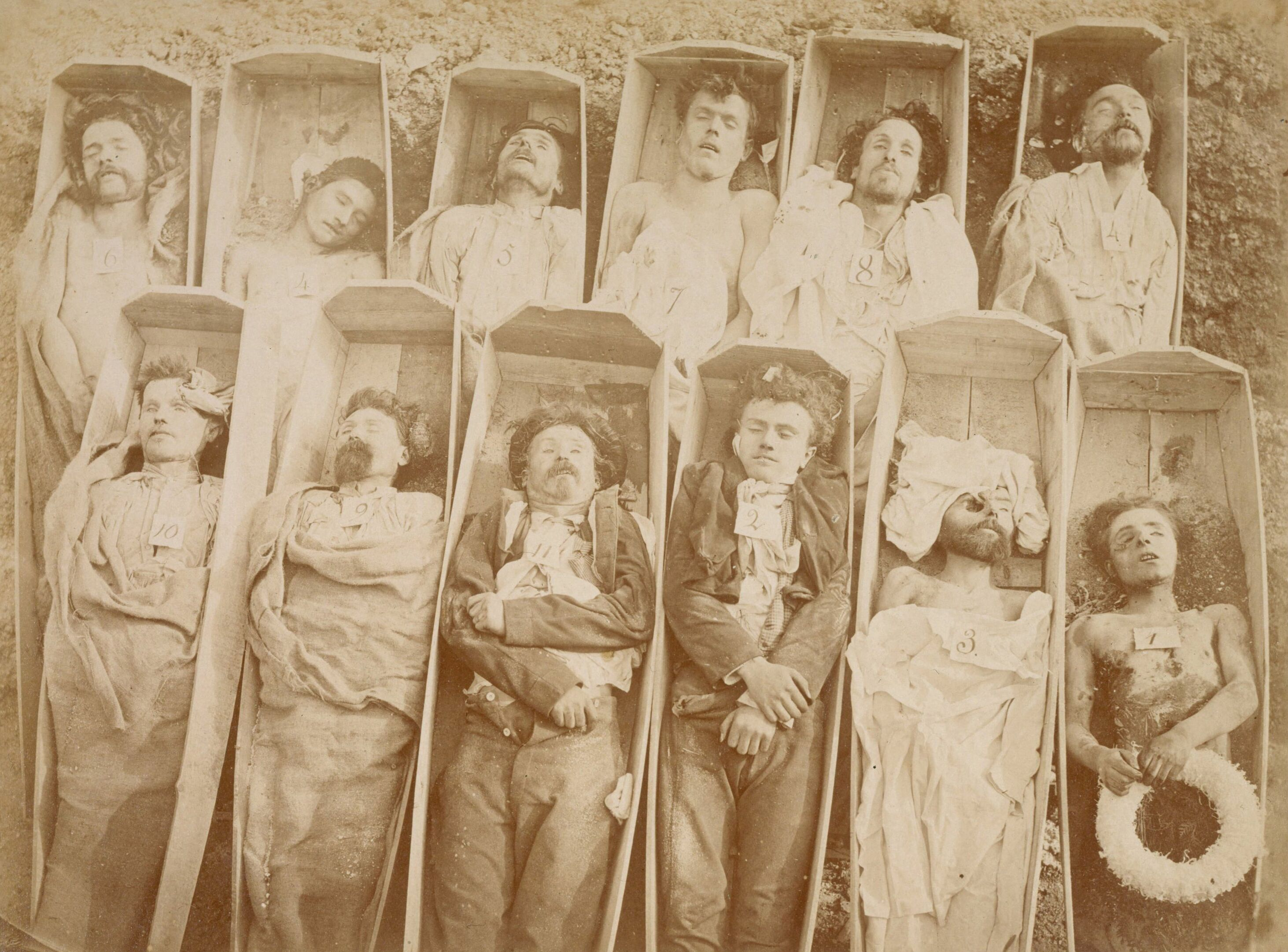
The defeat of the Paris Commune in May 1871 was followed by harsh reprisals against the defeated revolutionaries.

The IWA was not geographically limited to New York City and its environs. In fact the first formal section of the International was established in the West Coast city of San Francisco in March 1869. Within a year supporters of the International were playing a role in the movement for the 8-hour day in San Francisco, Chicago, Boston, and New York.

Growth of the IWA in America was spurred enormously by the launch of the Paris Commune on March 26, 1871. Vilified by the conservative press, iconoclasts and radicals of all stripes in America rallied to the revolutionary city government of Paris, which was closely linked with the International Workingmen's Association in the public mind, if not in actual practice. Although the Parisian barricades were overrun by defenders of the old regime in May amidst a bloody reaction that claimed as many as 20,000 lives, the French events nevertheless occupied the thinking of a generation in much in the same way that the Russian Revolution of 1917 would have a polarizing and far reaching impact nearly half a century later.

While most of the American press denounced the revolutionaries of Paris, radical reformers took up the revolutionary vision in the pages of their own journals. The National Anti-Slavery Standard carried regular dispatches from Paris and kept its readers informed of the legal and political retribution levied against Commune leaders in the aftermath of the failed uprising. The Boston magazine Commonwealth, established by a Southern abolitionist minister, likewise defended the Commune in its pages. So, too, did radical abolitionist Wendell Phillips, who declared, "There is no hope for France but in the Reds."

In addition to the abolitionist movement, an additional source of broad support for the goals and methods of the Paris Commune came via various newspapers associated with the Spiritualist movement. The largest Spiritualist weekly, Banner of Light, attempted to explain for its readers the motivations and actions of the Communards, declaring they were "weary of the servitude that practically accompanies the wages condition, when all exercise of political power is denied it."

By September 1871 there were 19 sections of the International in the US, of which 3 were "American" and 16 were non-English speaking. Eight more sections were added the next month and another 7 in November. By the end of 1871 the IWA in America included a total of about 35 sections, including groups in Philadelphia, Washington, DC, St. Louis, New Orleans, Newark, New Jersey, and Springfield, Massachusetts, among other places.

While no hard membership data is extant, scholarly estimates of the total number of American participants have generally clustered in the vicinity of 5,000, Samuel Bernstein, perhaps the most careful scholar of the subject, indicates that total membership "very likely did not go beyond 4,000, after the increase in the first part of 1872."

=== Section 12 ===
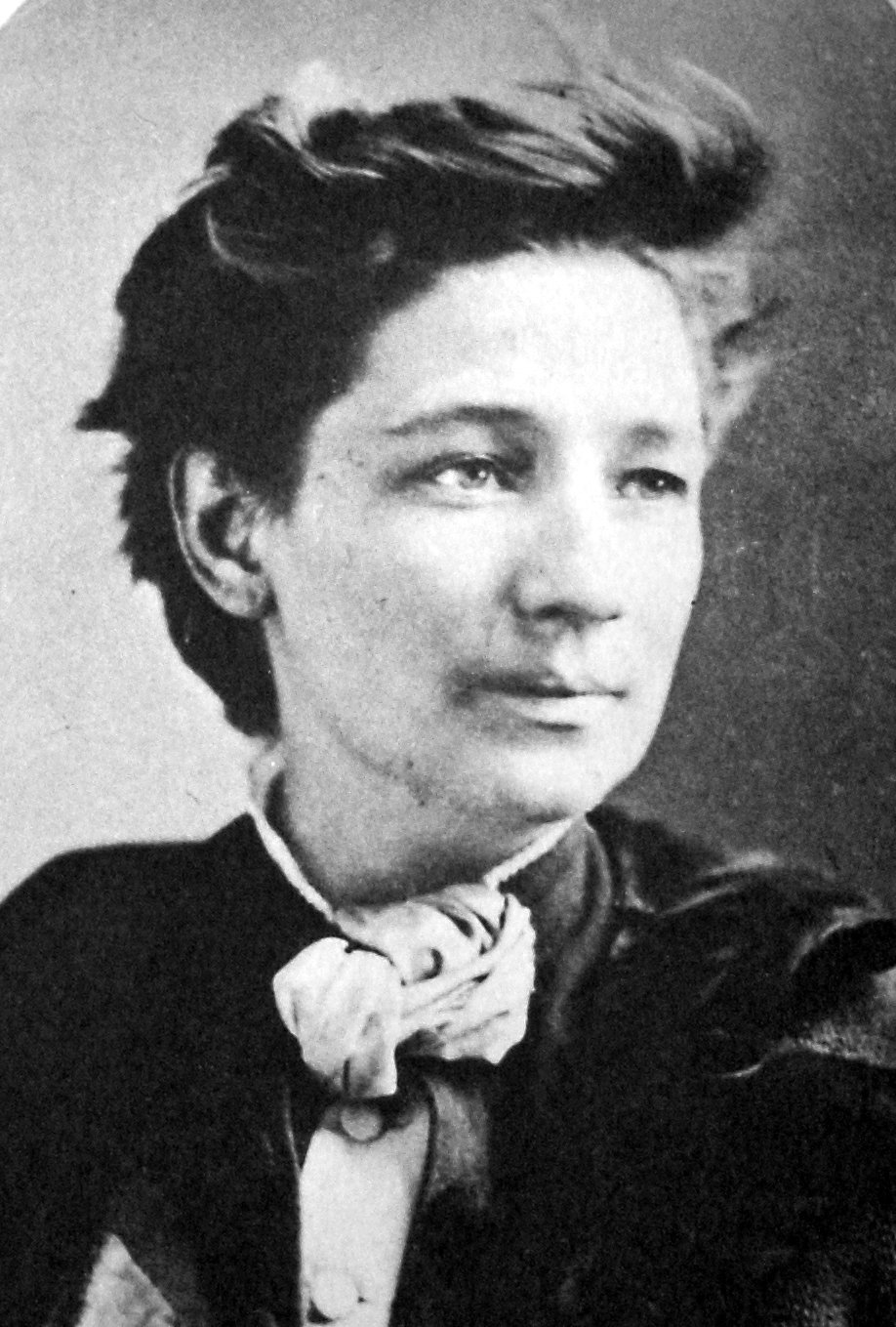
Victoria Woodhull (1838-1927) - Spiritualist, feminist, stockbroker, reform advocate, leader of Section 12, and 1872 candidate for President of the United States.

The French events also seem to have helped radicalize Victoria Woodhull and her sister Tennessee Claflin, editors in 1870 of the eclectic Woodhull & Claflin's Weekly. Woodhull and Claflin were daughters of a religious revivalist mother and a father reckoned by his contemporaries as a grifter; Victoria had attempted to escape through marriage at age 15, while Tennessee had been exploited as a purported psychic healer and namesake of a homebrewed quack remedy concocted by her parents, "Miss Tennessee's Magnetio Life Elixir for Beautifying the Complexion and Cleansing the Blood."

Following Victoria's divorce from her drunken and philandering first husband, the pair set up shop as "Tennessee Claflin and Victoria Woodhull, Clairvoyants" and managed to stack up a substantial nest egg from gullible believers. Their list of satisfied clients ultimately included among them none other than Cornelius Vanderbilt, one of the country's richest men.

Backed with Vanderbilt's cash through silent partnership, in 1870 the sisters Woodhull and Claflin had become stockbrokers, establishing the first brokerage managed by women up to that date. It was with the profits from Woodhull, Claflin & Co. that Woodhull and Claflin's Weekly had sprung. The paper's reformist political line was pumped up and made profitable with a sensationalistic approach and a hyperbolic writing style. Covering a broad range of subjects running the gamut from abolitionism to feminism to labor reform to Spiritualism, in 1871 the paper dedicated significant coverage to the Paris Commune and the entity commonly imagined to be behind it, the IWA.

The paper reprinted official documents of the International and ran an interview with Karl Marx himself, with Marx returning the favor by providing the controversial female editors with a first-hand account by his daughter Jenny of her expulsion from France. It was an unlikely vehicle for the social revolution, and the opportunistic sisters with their unconventional lifestyle deeply alienated the German international socialists of Section 1.

Woodhull and Claflin were instrumental in the organization of a second English-language branch of the International in New York City, IWA Branch 12, making use of the newspaper's office as a meeting location. Section 12 attracted a wide range of dissident intellectuals, including in the first place tinsmith and abolitionist William West. Also active in Section 12 was Stephen Pearl Andrews, an abolitionist who had previously established a failed utopian socialist community on Long Island called "Modern Times." Andrews had later established a commune on Manhattan called "Unitary Home" and had with his wife launched a political group called the New Democracy, members of which went on to help launch Sections 9 and 12 of the IWA in New York City.

=== Factional strife ===
A sharp difference of opinion emerged between the committed centralists of German-speaking Branch 1 of New York City and the predominantly middle class English-speaking Branches 9, 12, and 26 — with Branch 12 in the leading role. These latter have been described by historian Samuel Bernstein as "American autonomists," who

"by reason of faith in their respective blueprints of what America ought to be, counted first, on the spread of enlightenment and the democratic process to cleanse government of corruption, and then, on meliorative laws to direct the nation toward their primal model. Thus a boundary divided autonomists; but they lined up together against centralized authority."

Section 12 disputed the authority of the Central Committee, dominated by Section 1, writing a letter to the General Council in London in the fall of 1871 calling for it to take control over the entire American movement. Section 12 had its friends on the General Council, including general secretary John Hales and corresponding secretary for the United States George Eccarius. It pushed forward with its own program of eclectic social reform in 1872, bringing a protest from the doctrinaire international socialists of Section 1, who demanded the suspension from the organization for their ideological heresy of their erstwhile comrades.

A fight for control of the American movement ensured, with Section 1 in the minority, supported by most of the German and the Irish sections, with Section 12 winning the American, two of the German, and most of the French sections for its program. In response, Section 1 and its supporters split the IWA, establishing a new governing body called the Federal Council. Both Section 12 and Section 1 appealed to the General Council in London to resolve the dispute. In March 1872 the General Council issued its ruling, suspending Section 12 from the organization and ordering the two rival executive bodies to unite into a single provisional committee pending formal resolution at the next national convention.

Section 12 continued an independent existence, ultimately convening its own convention at the Apollo Theater in New York City. This gathering nominated a ticket headed by Victoria Woodhull as its candidate for President of the United States.

The main body of the IWA opened its 1st National Convention in New York on July 6, 1872, with representatives of 22 sections in attendance. The gathering adopted a new formal name for the American organization — the North American Federation of the International Workingmen's Association — as well as compiling a new set of organizational bylaws.

=== A battle between Anarchists and Socialists ===
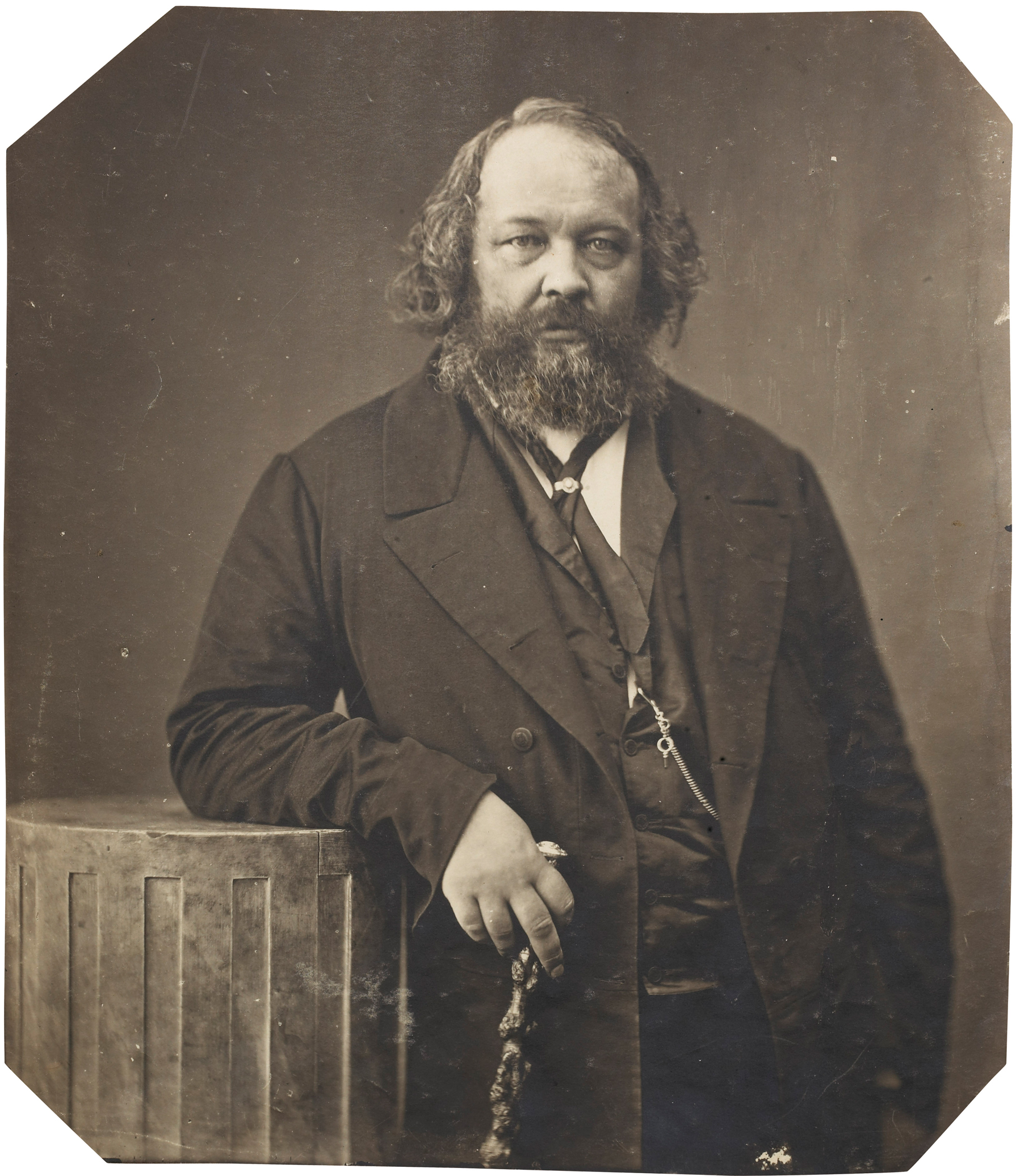
Mikhail Bakunin (1814-1876) an émigré from Tsarist Russia, was an anarchist theoretician and competitor with Marx for control of the IWA.

The Americans were not the only national division of the International fighting a factional war for control of the organization. The General Council, which had long been divided between moderate trade union reformers and international socialist revolutionaries, was becoming the object of a still greater fight — a battle between anarchists and socialists. More than an ideological battle, this struggle also fell into the realm of personal antipathy between the primary leaders of the two wings, the German émigré Karl Marx and the Russian émigré Mikhail Bakunin.

Marx saw a socialist future as the inevitable result of a process of economic growth and development, with the revolutionary transformation making it possible conducted by an educated and disciplined working class led by a political party. In the view of Bakunin, the new world would emerge via the revolt of the poor and oppressed masses, workers and peasant farmers alike, suffering under the heel of an exploitative semi-feudal economic and political structure. Bakunin was contemptuous of the educated industrial workers favored by Marx, believing they were "infected with a bourgeois outlook," and instead favored an alliance of radical intellectuals, the peasant masses, as well as the most impoverished and unwashed workers of the cities.

Bakunin rejected the coordinated trade union and political action favored by the international socialists, instead professing the expedience and necessity of the armed uprising. He sought the forcible destruction of state power and its replacement with what historian Juilius Braunthal has characterized as a "stateless federation of communes free from all outside coercion and authority." Marx, on the other hand, saw a long process of education and organization as a necessary precursor for a revolutionary overthrow of the ruling class, followed by a "withering away" of the coercive state in the new non-exploitative world. In short, Bakunin and Marx agreed upon little, rejected the fundamental ideas of the other, and saw themselves as antagonistic rivals locked in an irreconcilable conflict for control of the fledgling IWA organization.
