= Most–Grottkau debate =

1884 political debate

"Anarchism or Communism?", better known as the Most–Grottkau debate, was a nationally advertised, public debate between America's foremost revolutionary anarchist Johann Most and Paul Grottkau in Chicago on May 24, 1884. The session consisted of two statements and two rebuttals and was published by the Chicago International Working People's Association as a 48-page pamphlet.

== Debate ==
Johann Most of the anarchist International Working People's Association and Paul Grottkau of the Socialist Labor Party debated the relative merits of their movements.

Grottkau spoke in favor of socialism without government, which if defined as the ruling class's executive committee, would be without purpose in a classless socialist society. He supported the continued institutions of family and marriage, which he argued were moral institutions, unlike class organizations like the state. In contrast, Most believed that the state modeled itself on the family structure and that the state's interference in the private affair of marriage was immoral. Repressive human laws and mores, Most argued, led to an exploitative society that fostered inequality, crime, and vice. He believed this would be remedied by eliminating government as its root factor. Grottkau believed in class-based revolution led by the working class, as compared to Most, who advocated for a revolutionary vanguard. Additionally, whereas Most advocated for violent means and "transitional dictatorship", Grottkau did not.

== Bibliography ==
- Goyens, Tom (2007). Beer and Revolution: The German Anarchist Movement in New York City, 1880–1914. Urbana, Illinois: University of Illinois Press. ISBN 978-0-252-03175-5.
- Johnpoll, Bernard K.; Klehr, Harvey, eds. (1986). Biographical Dictionary of the American Left. Westport, Connecticut: Greenwood Press. ISBN 978-0-313-24200-7.
