= Adolph Strasser =

Austrian-born American trade union organizer (1843–1939)

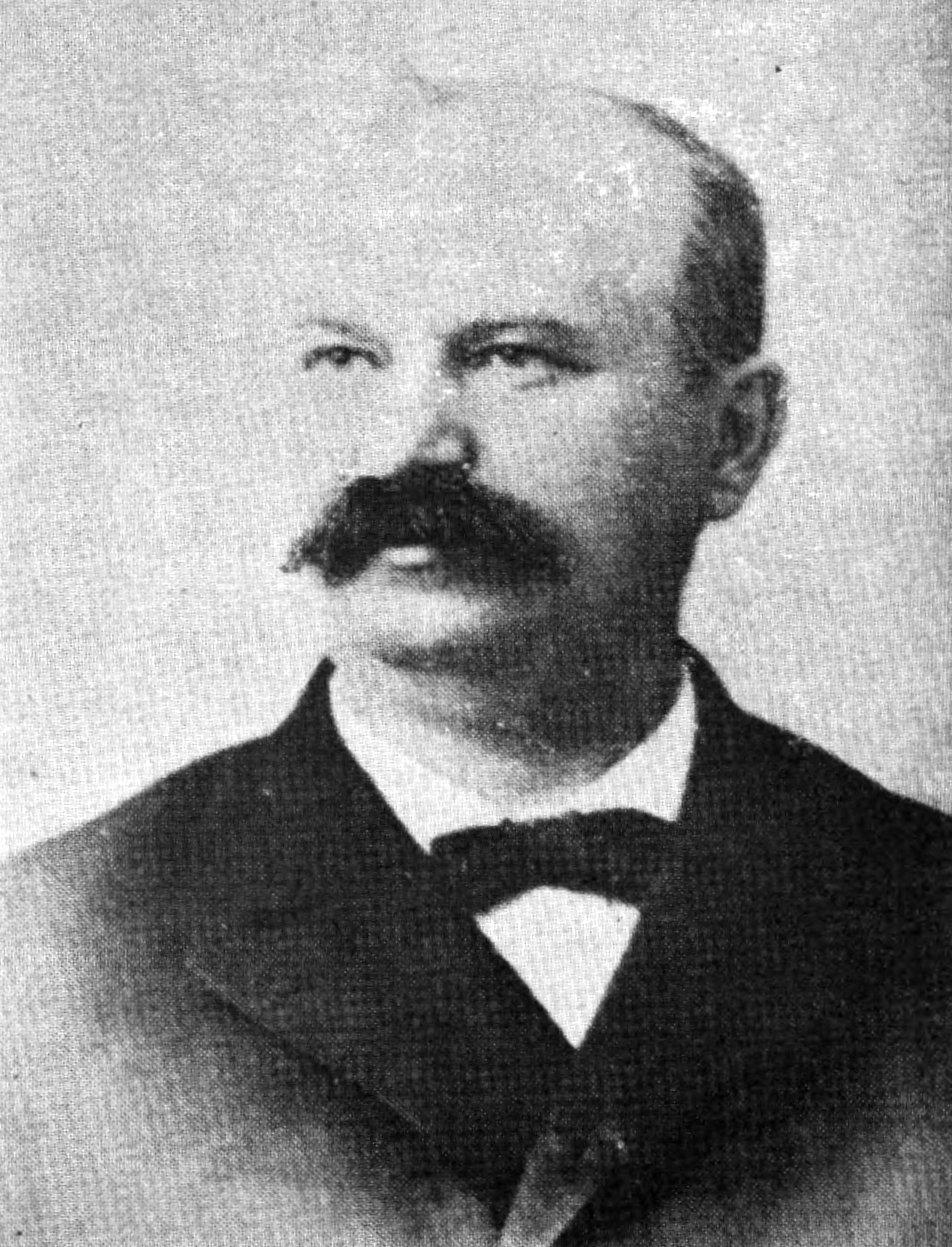
Adolph Strasser (1843–1939)

Adolph Strasser (1843–1939), born in the Austrian Empire, was an American trade union organizer. Strasser is best remembered as a founder of the United Cigarmakers Union and the American Federation of Labor (AF of L). Strasser was additionally the president of the Cigar Makers' International Union for a period of 14 years, heading the union during the period in which it introduced its successful union label and gained substantial organizational strength.

== Biography ==
=== Early years ===
Adolph Strasser was born in the Austrian Empire in 1843. He was a native speaker of German.

Strasser emigrated to the United States in 1871 or perhaps 1872. After his arrival in America, Strasser worked at the craft of cigar making, taking up residence and employment in New York City.

In his posthumous memoirs fellow cigarmaker Samuel Gompers recalled his impressions of Strasser from the time he met him in 1872:

Strasser was a man of extraordinary mentality. He came to America some months before, traveling considerably through the South before settling in New York City. He had been identified with the IWA (International Workingmen's Association) and became a leader of American Section 5. Then for a while he was exceedingly active in the work of the Social Democratic Party. He shifted all his energy to the trade union movement when he came to understand the unsoundness and impracticability of Socialist Party policy and philosophy or, as Strasser called it, "sophistry." * * *

Strasser had a keen practical mind... No one knew Strasser's early life and no one asked him questions lightly, for Strasser had a terse bluntness of expression in English and in German that made even the most venturesome hesitate to take liberties. Whether he learned cigarmaking in Europe or the United States I do not know, but he did not make cigars as one who had learned the trade in his youth.... It was often said that Strasser came of a well-to-do cultured Hungarian family. At any rate, he looked the part. He must have had some little means, for he dressed well even when he gave all his time to the International [Union] for a salary of $250 a year.

While Gompers is unclear about the date of Strasser's break with the socialist movement, it is known that in 1874 Strasser helped to organize the Social Democratic Workingmen's Party of the United States, one of the first International Socialist political parties in North America. Moreover, continued his activity in its successor organizations, which culminated as the Socialist Labor Party at the end of 1877.

== Career ==
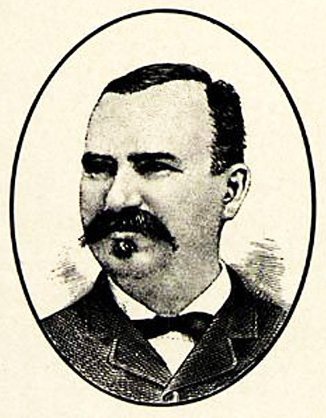
Strasser c. 1880s

In the course of this activity, Strasser became involved in the trade union movement, initially helping to found the United Cigarmakers Union, concentrating for its members upon those tenement-based workers excluded from membership in the Cigar Makers International Union (CMIU). Strasser soon joined forces with the CMIU, editing the monthly magazine established by that union in 1875, the Cigar Makers' Official Journal.

In 1876 and 1877 Strasser was instrumental in helping to establish a central body bringing together New York City's various local trade unions.

Strasser was elected vice president of the Cigar Makers' International Union in 1876 and president in 1877. He continued to serve in that capacity until stepping down from the job in 1891.

During Strasser's term as head of the CMIU the organization began to win strikes which it had previously lost. Between 1871 and 1875 the union had waged 78 strikes, winning just 12, but in the years from 1876 to 1881 a total of 69 strikes had been fought, with 58 resolved in favor of the striking cigar workers.

Strasser was a close ally of Samuel Gompers, siding with him in the early 1880s against the Socialist "Progressive" faction of the Cigarmakers' Union in a split of the union. Strasser also fought against New York's District Assembly 49 of the Knights of Labor for its support of the Progressive Cigarmakers.

In 1886 Strasser was one of five signatories to a call for a convention in Columbus, Ohio, which was to formally establish the American Federation of Labor (AF of L).

Gompers and Strasser were outspoken opponents of the tenement system of production, in which raw materials were provided to workers for manufacture at home. Under their leadership the CMIU attempted to outlaw the practice of home work outright rather than making any effort to organize cigar workers engaged in that form of production.

In 1881 the CMIU adopted use of a special "Blue Label" to denote union-made cigars.

Following his retirement as CMIU president in 1891 he continued to work for the union as an organizer and auditor. He also was active in the American Federation of Labor as a lecturer, lobbyist, and arbitrator of jurisdictional disputes between competing craft unions.

=== Later years ===
Strasser left the trade union movement in 1914, becoming a real estate agent in Buffalo, New York, for the next five years.

In 1919 Strasser retired, living first in Chicago through 1929. In 1930 Strasser moved to Daytona Beach, located on the Atlantic coast of the state of Florida, where he lived out the last decade of his life.

=== Death and legacy ===
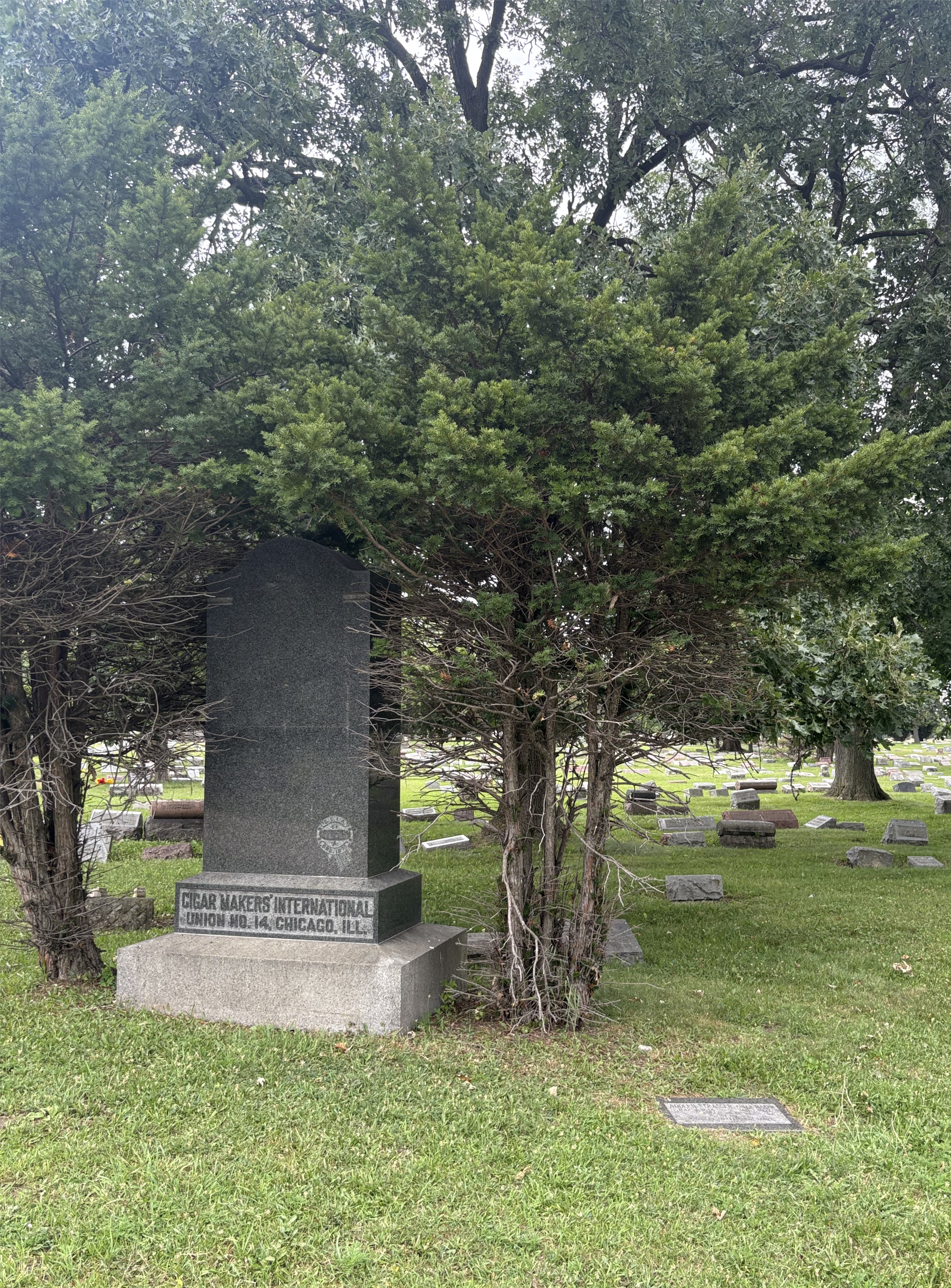
Monument to the Cigar Makers' International Union alongside Strasser's grave at Forest Home Cemetery

Adolph Strasser died on January 1, 1939, in Lakeland, Florida. He was 95 years old at the time of his death.

He was buried at Forest Home Cemetery in Forest Park, Illinois.

== Footnotes ==
Trade union offices
| Preceded by George Hurst | President of the Cigar Makers' International Union; 1877–1891 | Succeeded by George W. Perkins |
| Preceded by Samuel Gompers; P. J. McGuire | American Federation of Labor delegate to the Trades Union Congress; 1896; With: Jeremiah Sulivan | Succeeded by Martin Fox; George E. McNeill |
