= Samuel Bernstein (historian) =

French historian

Samuel Bernstein (1898–1987) was an American historian born in France. His field of study was history of social movements. His 1933 work The Beginnings of Marxian Socialism in France was a reworking of his thesis and has been criticized for its very narrow scope.

== Works ==
- The Beginnings of Marxian Socialism in France. New York: Elliot Publishing Co., 1933.
- Jefferson and the French Revolution. New York: Science and Society, 1943.
- Filippo Buonarroti. Torino, Italy: G. Einaudi, 1946.
- A Centenary of Marxism. New York: Science and Society, 1948.
- Buonarroti. Paris: Hier et aujourd'hui, 1949.
- Contribution á lh̓istoire du socialisme en France: De la Révolution de 1789 á la Commune de 1871. Paris: Editions Hier et Aujourdʻhui, 1949.
- Essays in Political and Intellectual History. New York: Paine-Whitman, 1955.
- Amerikanische Freunde der franzȯsischen Revolution. Berlin: Rütten and Loening, 1958.
- The First International in America. New York: Augustus M. Kelley, 1962.
- Storia del socialismo in Francia: Dall'Illuminismo alla commune. Rome: Editori Riuniti, 1963.
- Blanqui. Paris: F. Maspero, 1970.
- Auguste Blanqui and the Art of Insurrection. London: Lawrence and Wishart, 1971.
- Babeuf's Conspiracy Viewed by the Press of the United States. Assen, the Netherlands: Royal VanGorcum, 1975.
- French Political and Intellectual History. New York: Paine-Whitman Publishers, 1984.
- Joel Barlow: A Connecticut Yankee in an Age of Revolution. New York: Rutledge Books, 1985.
