= Lassalleanism =

Socialist tendency developed by Ferdinand Lassalle

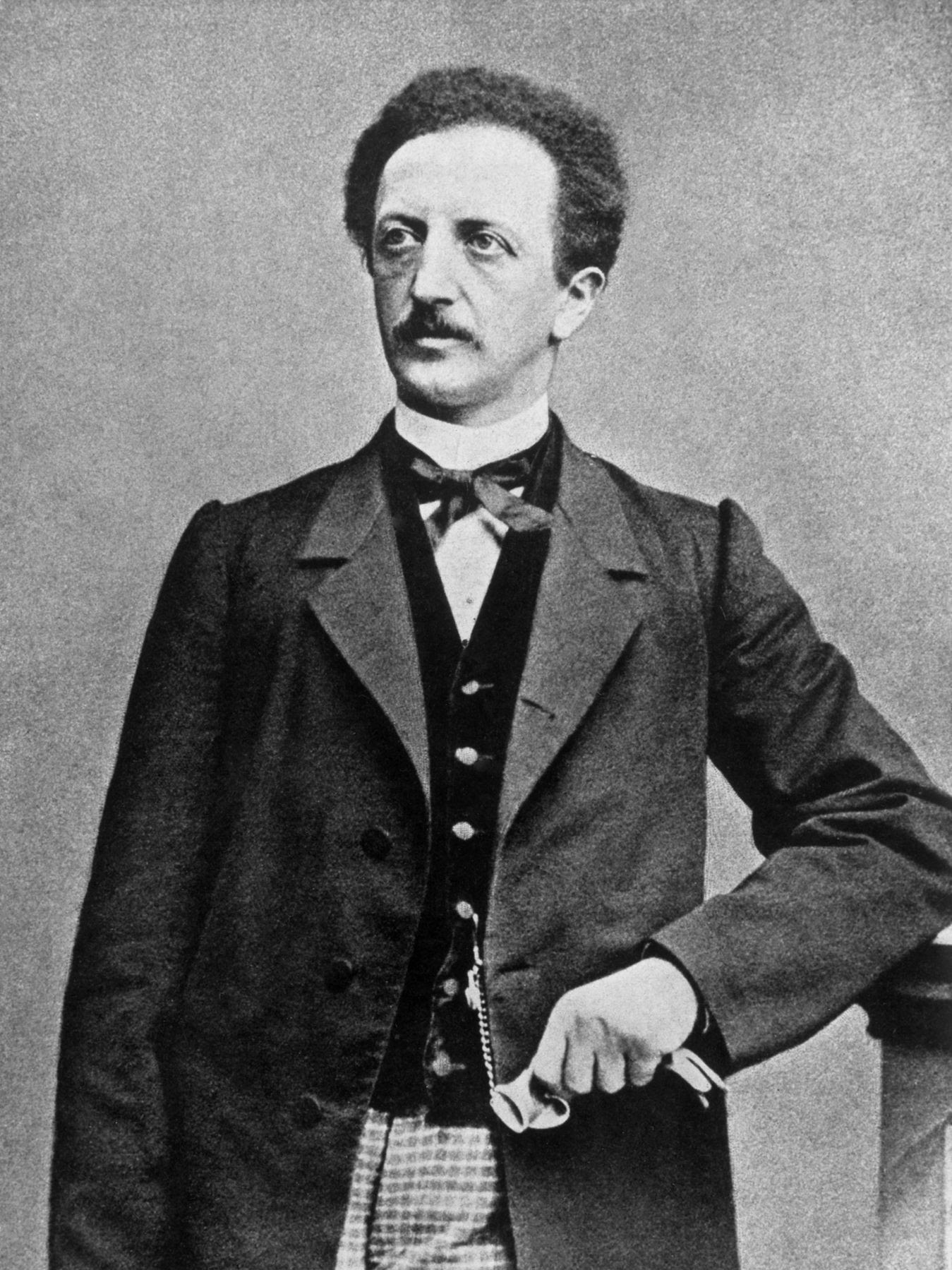
Ferdinand Lassalle

Lassalleanism (also Lassallism) was a state socialist political tendency developed by the German jurist and socialist activist Ferdinand Lassalle. Lassalleanism viewed the state as a neutral, eternal institution above class society, which could be captured by workers through universal suffrage to bring about socialism. Its central practical demand was for state aid to be provided for the establishment of producer cooperatives. Proponents of this strategy advocated an alliance between the workers' movement and the Prussian state against the liberal bourgeoisie.

The ideology was most prominent in the General German Workers' Association (ADAV), which Lassalle founded in 1863. Karl Marx and Friedrich Engels, who were Lassalle's contemporaries, were vociferous critics of Lassalleanism, which they described as "Royal Prussian government socialism" and a form of "social Bonapartism". They argued that it was an opportunist tendency that abandoned independent class action in favour of a single dogmatic "panacea" and tied the nascent workers' movement to the existing aristocratic-bureaucratic state. The conflict culminated in Marx's 1875 Critique of the Gotha Programme, which opposed the fusion of the Marxist Social Democratic Workers' Party with the Lassallean ADAV on the basis of a program heavily influenced by Lassallean ideas.

Although Lassalleanism as a distinct current declined with the rise of industrial society in Germany, its principles—particularly its focus on achieving socialism through the existing state rather than through revolutionary action from below—persisted as a major influence on reformism and social democracy.

== Ideology ==
Lassalleanism developed in the specific context of mid-19th century Prussia, where the rising industrial bourgeoisie was in political conflict with the still-dominant landowning aristocracy (the Junker class) and its bureaucratic state. Lassalle's strategy proposed a "three-cornered confrontation" in which the working class would ally with the absolutist state against the bourgeoisie.

=== The cult of the state ===
The centerpiece of Lassallean ideology was its conception of the state. Hal Draper traces this view directly to the philosophies of Georg Wilhelm Friedrich Hegel and Johann Gottlieb Fichte. In what Eduard Bernstein called the "cult of the State as such", Lassalle viewed the state in a Hegelian fashion, as an entity above class society with its own "ethical" mission "to accomplish the development of the human race toward freedom". He believed the state had always served this purpose, even against the will of its leaders, and was the "institution in which the whole virtue of mankind shall realize itself". Seeing the working class as representing over 96 percent of the population, Lassalle concluded through "arithmetic" that the state logically belonged to them and was, by definition, their "great association".

This view stood in stark opposition to the Marxist theory of the state, which posits the state as an instrument of class rule that must be overthrown and replaced by a workers' state. For Lassalleans, the task was not to conquer or abolish the state but to lead it to fulfill its "true" historical mission. This glorification of the state led Marx and Engels to criticize Lassalleanism as a "Royal Prussian government socialism" that fostered a "servile belief in the state".

=== State aid for producer cooperatives ===
The central programmatic plank and "panacea" of Lassalleanism was the demand for state aid—specifically, large state loans—to establish a network of producer cooperatives. Lassalle modified the existing idea of self-help cooperatives by replacing it with a demand for "state-help". He believed this network, financed by the existing Prussian state, would gradually expand to encompass the entire economy, leading to the establishment of socialism. This program was not original to Lassalle; similar ideas had been put forward by French Catholic socialists like Philippe Buchez and during the 1848 revolution in Berlin.

Lassalle himself regarded the state-aid slogan as a clever, practical plank—a "little finger that must lead thereto"—believing the cooperatives would be the "organic germ of development" that would eventually, over centuries, lead to the "supersession of property in land and capital". Marx and Engels criticized this demand not because they opposed cooperatives or state aid in principle, but because the Lassalleans made it the "sole and infallible panacea for all social ailments". In their view, it was a sectarian nostrum that substituted a single demand on the existing state for the revolutionary mobilization of the working class.

=== The "iron law of wages" ===
Lassalle justified the necessity of state intervention by promoting the economic concept of the iron law of wages. Borrowing from classical economists like David Ricardo, he argued that under capitalism, wages were naturally driven down to the bare minimum required for subsistence and reproduction. According to Lassalle, this "iron and inexorable law" meant that any efforts by workers to improve their own conditions through self-help—such as forming trade unions or independent cooperatives—were doomed to fail, making state intervention the only solution to the "social question".

Marx heavily criticized this doctrine in his Critique of the Gotha Programme, calling it an "outrageous retrogression" based on an outdated theory that had since been superseded by the theory of surplus value.

== Political strategy and movement ==
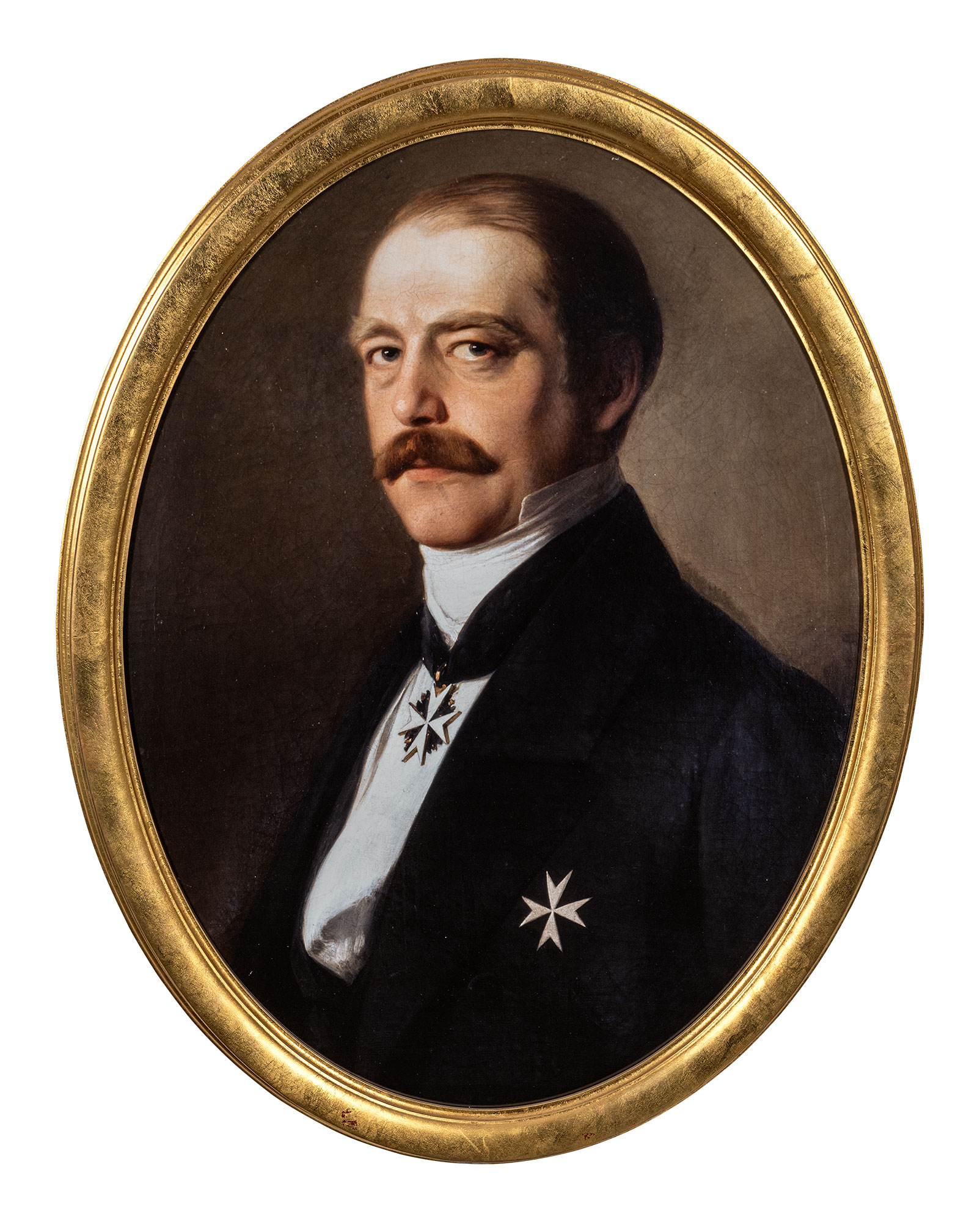
Otto von Bismarck

Lassalle's political strategy aimed to create an alliance between his workers' movement, representing the masses, and the Prussian state, representing the old absolutist ruling class, against their common enemy, the liberal bourgeoisie. In practice, this led to secret discussions with Otto von Bismarck, which Marx and his followers saw as a "disastrous illusion" that the workers' movement could do business with the aristocratic state. This orientation, which Hal Draper terms "social Caesarism" or "social Bonapartism", was predicated on Lassalle's belief that the monarchy was a more natural ally for labor than the bourgeoisie.

In a letter to Bismarck in 1863, Lassalle argued that "the working class feels instinctively inclined to dictatorship" and would be inclined "to see in the Crown the natural bearer of the social dictatorship, in contrast to the egoism of bourgeois society". He offered his General German Workers' Association (ADAV) as a loyal mass base for the monarchy, transforming it from a "kingdom of the privileged classes into a social and revolutionary People’s Kingdom!" The ADAV itself was a tightly centralized organization structured as a personal dictatorship under Lassalle, whose constitution granted him near-absolute power and who claimed to wield the "wills of all of us into one single hammer", seeing his organization as a "prototype of our next form of society on a large scale".

Marx and Engels argued that this strategy was a form of political opportunism. They pointed out that the bourgeoisie itself was quick to renounce its own political freedoms in favor of a Caesarist dictator as soon as its economic privileges were threatened, and that Lassalle was simply offering the same deal from the other side of the class divide. György Lukács, in his The Destruction of Reason (1952), argues that Lassalle's "personal and political move towards Bismarck" was an "inevitable logical consequence" of the "ideological influence of the Bonapartist trend" and that his disapproval of other independent proletarian movements, was caused by his application of Hegel's "reactionary idealist" notion of the "State's primacy over the economy, which he mechanically applied to the proletarian liberation movement".

Although the ADAV attracted some workers from democratic associational traditions, its main base came from "proletarianized, semi-independent workers, masters and journeymen in small workshops, and home workers" in proto-industrial regions. Members included artisans in classic trades like tailoring, shoemaking, and cigarmaking, who were facing the pressures of industrialization. When Lassalle died in a duel in August 1864, the ADAV had only 4,600 members and was far from a mass organization. His followers continued to promote his ideas, solidifying three core tenets of Lassalleanism: unconditional ideological and organizational independence from the liberal bourgeoisie, the ADAV as an agitational organization for universal suffrage with a structure true to Lassalle's original statutes, and the belief that trade unions were incapable of permanently improving the conditions of workers.

== Critique by Marx and Engels ==
Karl Marx

From 1862 onward, Karl Marx's critique of Lassalleanism was consistently political and ideological, contrary to a long-standing myth, promoted by Lassalleans and later by biographer Franz Mehring, that his hostility was rooted in personal jealousy. In fact, for years Marx defended Lassalle against the criticisms of other German communists in the Rhineland, who were intimately familiar with Lassalle's character, and even proposed him for membership in the Communist League in 1850, a proposal that was unanimously rejected by the Cologne committee.

Marx's political break with Lassalle solidified in 1862, when Lassalle visited him in London. Lassalle revealed his pro-Prussian politics and his strategy of seeking an alliance with the monarchy, which Marx found abhorrent. When Lassalle launched the ADAV in 1863, Marx was critical of its state-socialist program but was reluctant to publicly attack the first independent working-class movement in Germany in decades. However, when the Lassallean party newspaper, Der Social-Demokrat, began openly supporting Bismarck's imperial policy and glorifying the monarchical regime, Marx and Engels broke off relations in February 1865, denouncing what they called "Royal Prussian government socialism". Marx wrote that the Lassallean tendency was dangerous because it sought to "tie the workers' movement to the existing state".

=== Critique of the Gotha Programme ===
The conflict came to a head in 1875 during the negotiations for a unity congress between the Lassallean ADAV and the Social Democratic Workers' Party (SDAP), which was influenced by Marxism. By this time, the Lassallean movement was in decline. Marx argued that any unification was only acceptable if the Lassalleans dropped their sectarian program. He proposed instead a period of common action and discussion, stating that "every step of real movement is more important than a dozen programmes". The SDAP leadership under Wilhelm Liebknecht, however, pushed for immediate fusion and produced a draft program heavily influenced by Lassallean principles. According to historian Vernon L. Lidtke, this was not simply a concession by the Marxists, but reflected the fact that Lassalle's ideas had already become a traditional part of the German working-class movement as a whole; even the SDAP had adopted many of his conceptions.

In his Critique of the Gotha Programme, Marx subjected the draft to a detailed critique. He reiterated that Lassalle's "iron law of wages" was an outdated economic theory, attacked the demand for state aid as a reversal of socialist principles, and condemned the program's vision of a "free state" as a concession to Lassallean state-worship. He summarized the entire program as "tainted through and through by the Lassallean sect's servile belief in the state". Despite Marx's critique, which was suppressed by the party leadership for sixteen years, the Gotha unity congress went ahead, and the Social Democratic Party of Germany (SPD) was formed.

== Legacy and decline ==
Although Lassalleanism declined as a distinct political tendency after the founding of the SPD, Lassallean ideas continued to exert a significant influence. During the period of the Anti-Socialist Laws (1878–1890), Lassalle's personal popularity remained immense among German workers. Criticizing him directly was difficult; August Bebel noted in 1891 that any attack on Lassalle would "awaken fanaticism" because the people had "too long looked upon Lassalle as their champion".

While Lassalleanism as a coherent ideology was "no longer an up-to-date guide" in the 1880s, its "statist aspects exerted much influence". This legacy was most apparent in the "moderate" wing of the Social Democratic Party, which included figures like Karl Frohme and Max Kayser. The "Lassallean glorification of the state", as Lidtke notes, "opened the door for Social Democrats to view State Socialism with favor" and made parts of the party receptive to Bismarck's social welfare programs. The Lassallean movement was also credited with creating the first modern German labor party and fostering a combative class consciousness, but it also contributed to the "separation of proletarian from bourgeois democracy in Germany", seen by some historians as a key component of Germany's "special path" to modernity.

== See also ==
- Ricardian socialism
