= Baxandall =

Baxandall is a surname. Notable people with the surname include:

- George Baxandall Constantine (1902–1969), English and Pakistani jurist
- Lee Baxandall (1935–2008), American writer, editor and critic, and naturist
- Michael Baxandall (1933–2008), British art historian, academic, and curator
- Peter Baxandall (1921–1995), English audio and electrical engineer
- Phineas Baxandall, American policy analyst
- Rosalyn Baxandall (1939–2015), American historian and feminist
