= Linda Gordon =

American historian and author (born 1940)

- Born: Irene Linda Gordon; January 19, 1940 (age 86); Chicago, Illinois, U.S.
- Education: Swarthmore College (BA); Yale University (MA, PhD)
- Spouse: Allen Hunter
- Children: Rosa Gordon Hunter
- Writing career
- Genre: non-fiction
- Subjects: History
- Notable awards: Bancroft Prize (2000, 2010)

Irene Linda Gordon (born January 19, 1940) is an American historian and professor who has written widely on 20th century social policy in the United States, with an emphasis on gender and family issues. She is a two-time recipient of the Bancroft Prize. Her best-known book is the 2009 biography, Dorothea Lange: A Life Beyond Limits.

== Early life and education ==
Linda Gordon was born in Chicago but considers Portland, Oregon, her home town. She is the daughter of William "Bill" Gordon and Helen Appelman Gordon, and the sister of Lawrence Edward Gordon and Lee David Gordon. Her father was a Jewish immigrant from Šumskas, a shtetl in what was then Poland, now Lithuania. He was a trade unionist and Communist Party member. Linda later described herself as a "red diaper baby".

She received her undergraduate degree in 1961 from Swarthmore College. She then went on to Yale University where she earned an M.A. in History and Russian Studies, and a Ph.D. in History in 1970. Her dissertation was published in 1983 as Cossack Rebellions: Social Turmoil in the Sixteenth-Century Ukraine, which won the Antonovych Prize.

== Career ==
Gordon began her teaching career at the University of Massachusetts Boston in 1968. She remained there until 1984. She was then hired by the University of Wisconsin–Madison. In 1993, she was named a Vilas Distinguished Research Professor at UW-Madison. In 1999, she relocated to New York City where she became University Professor of the Humanities and Professor of History at New York University.

=== Social history ===
Starting in the 1970s, Gordon focused her academic research on the roots of contemporary social policy debates in the U.S. Her 1976 book, Woman's Body, Woman's Right: The History of Birth Control Politics in America, has been called "the most complete history of birth control ever written"; it was revised and re-published in 2002 under the title, The Moral Property of Women.

In 1988, Gordon published a study of the U.S. response to various forms of family violence, including child abuse, spousal violence and sexual abuse. The book, Heroes of Their Own Lives: The History and Politics of Family Violence (1988), won the Joan Kelly prize of the American Historical Association. She had initiated her research on the subject back in the late 1970s, when she was awarded a grant from the National Endowment for the Humanities. During the Clinton administration, Gordon served on the National Advisory Council on Violence Against Women.

Gordon next turned her attention to the history of welfare in the U.S. In 1990, she edited the essay collection Women, the State, and Welfare. Her 1994 book, Pitied But Not Entitled: Single Mothers and the History of Welfare, 1890-1935, won the Berkshire Prize for best book on women's history, and the Gustavus Myers Human Rights Award. Her writings on welfare were often cited in the policy debates about the effectiveness of America's assistance program, Aid to Families with Dependent Children, which culminated in the 1996 Personal Responsibility and Work Opportunity Act.

In the late 1990s, Gordon shifted her approach to history writing. She began to put more emphasis on personal narratives and "microhistory", believing that individual stories offered a compelling method of bringing the past to life. Her first book in this genre was The Great Arizona Orphan Abduction (1999). It chronicled a 1904 vigilante action against Mexican-American foster parents of white orphans. In doing so, it illustrated how racism could supersede concern for the well-being of children. The book won the Bancroft Prize as well as the Albert J. Beveridge Award for best English-language book on the history of the Americas.

In 2017, Gordon published The Second Coming of the KKK: The Ku Klux Klan of the 1920s and the American Political Tradition. Her most recent book is Seven Social Movements That Changed America (2025).

=== Dorothea Lange biography ===
Gordon's 2009 biography of photographer Dorothea Lange, Dorothea Lange: A Life Beyond Limits, won numerous prizes, including the Bancroft Prize (making Gordon one of only four historians to win the award twice); the Los Angeles Times Book Prize for Biography; the National Arts Club prize for best arts writing; and the WILLA Literary Award. In the course of her research, she discovered a significant group of Lange photographs, most of which had never been published. They were photos of the internment of Japanese Americans during World War II. The photos were commissioned by the U.S. Army but then impounded because they were deemed too critical of the government's internment policy. Before the Lange biography was released, Gordon selected 119 of these images and published them, with introductory essays by herself and Gary Okihiro, in a book entitled Impounded (2006).

=== Other work ===
In 2015, Gordon was elected to the American Philosophical Society.

Gordon is one of the founding associate editors of the Journal of Women's History, and she serves on the international advisory board of Signs: Journal of Women in Culture and Society.

== Personal life ==
Gordon is married to fellow academic Allen Hunter. The couple live in New York City. They have a daughter, Rosa Gordon Hunter.

== Writings ==
- Gordon, Linda (1976). Woman's Body, Woman's Right: The History of Birth Control Politics in America. Viking/Penguin. ISBN 978-0140131277. Details.
- —— (1983). Cossack Rebellions: Social Turmoil in the Sixteenth-Century Ukraine. SUNY Press. ISBN 978-0873956543. Details.
- —— (1988). Heroes of Their Own Lives: The Politics and History of Family Violence : Boston, 1880-1960. Viking/Penguin. ISBN 978-0252070792. Reissued by the University of Illinois Press 2002. Details.
- —— (1994). Pitied But Not Entitled: Single Mothers and the History of Welfare. Free Press. ISBN 978-0674669826. Reprinted by Harvard University Press in 1995. Details.
- —— (1995). "A Genealogy of Dependency: Tracing a Keyword of the U.S. Welfare State". In Brenner, Johanna; Laslett, Barbara; Arat, Yasmin (eds.). Rethinking the Political: Gender, Resistance, and the State. Chicago: University of Chicago Press. pp. 33–60. ISBN 978-0226073996. Co-written with Nancy Fraser.
- —— (1999). The Great Arizona Orphan Abduction. Harvard University Press. ISBN 978-0674360419.
- —— (2002). The Moral Property of Women. University of Illinois Press. ISBN 978-0252027642. Revised and expanded edition of Woman's Body, Woman's Right.
- —— (2009). Dorothea Lange: A Life Beyond Limits. W. W. Norton. ISBN 978-0393057300.
- —— (2014). Feminism Unfinished: A Short, Surprising History of American Women's Movements. Liveright. ISBN 978-0871406767. Co-written with Dorothy Sue Cobble and Astrid Henry.
- —— (2017). The Second Coming of the KKK: The Ku Klux Klan of the 1920s and the American Political Tradition. Liveright. ISBN 978-1631493690. Details.
- —— (2018). Inge Morath: Magnum Legacy - An Illustrated Biography. Magnum Foundation/Prestel. ISBN 978-3-7913-8201-2.
- —— (2025). Seven Social Movements That Changed America. Liveright. ISBN 978-1631493713.

== Books edited ==
- Gordon, Linda; Baxandall, Rosalyn Fraad; Reverby, Susan, eds. (1976). America's Working Women: A Documentary History, 1600 to the Present. W. W. Norton & Company. ISBN 978-0393312621. Details. Revised ed. 1995.
- Gordon, Linda, ed. (1990). Women, the State, and Welfare: Historical and Theoretical Essays. University of Wisconsin Press. ISBN 978-0299126643. Details.
- Gordon, Linda; Baxandall, Rosalyn Fraad, eds. (2000). Dear Sisters: Dispatches from the Women's Liberation Movement. Basic Books. ISBN 978-0465017065.
- Gordon, Linda; Okihiro, Gary Y., eds. (2006). Impounded: Dorothea Lange and the Censored Images of Japanese American Internment in World War II. W. W. Norton. ISBN 978-0393060737.

== Selected articles ==
- "Black and White Visions of Welfare". The Journal of American History. 78 (2): 559–590. September 1991. doi:10.2307/2079534. JSTOR 2079534.
- "How 'Welfare' Became a Dirty Word". The Chronicle of Higher Education. July 20, 1994.
- "A Genealogy of Dependency" (PDF). Signs. 19 (2). University of Chicago Press: 309–336. Winter 1994. JSTOR 3174801., co-authored with Nancy Fraser.
- "If the Progressives Were Advising Us Today, Should We Listen?". The Journal of the Gilded Age and Progressive Era. 1 (2): 109–121. April 2002. doi:10.1017/S1537781400000165. JSTOR 25144292. S2CID 154545513.
- Lawrence, Bruce B.; Karim, Aisha, eds. (December 6, 2007). "Social Control and the Powers of the Weak". On Violence: A Reader. Duke University Press. ISBN 978-0822337560.
- "Translating Our Bodies, Ourselves". The Nation. May 29, 2008.
- Brooks, James; DeCorse, Christopher R. N.; Walton, John, eds. (2008). "Biography as Microhistory, Photography as Microhistory: Documentary Photographer Dorothea Lange as Subject and Agent of Microhistory". Small Worlds: Method, Meaning, and Narrative in Microhistory. School for Advanced Research Press. ISBN 978-1930618947.
- "The Perils of Innocence, or What's Wrong with Putting Children First". The Journal of the History of Childhood and Youth. 1 (3): 331–350. Fall 2008 – via Project Muse.
- "The New Deal Was a Good Idea, We Should Try It". History News Network. May 3, 2009.
