= Ephraim London =

American lawyer (1911–1990)

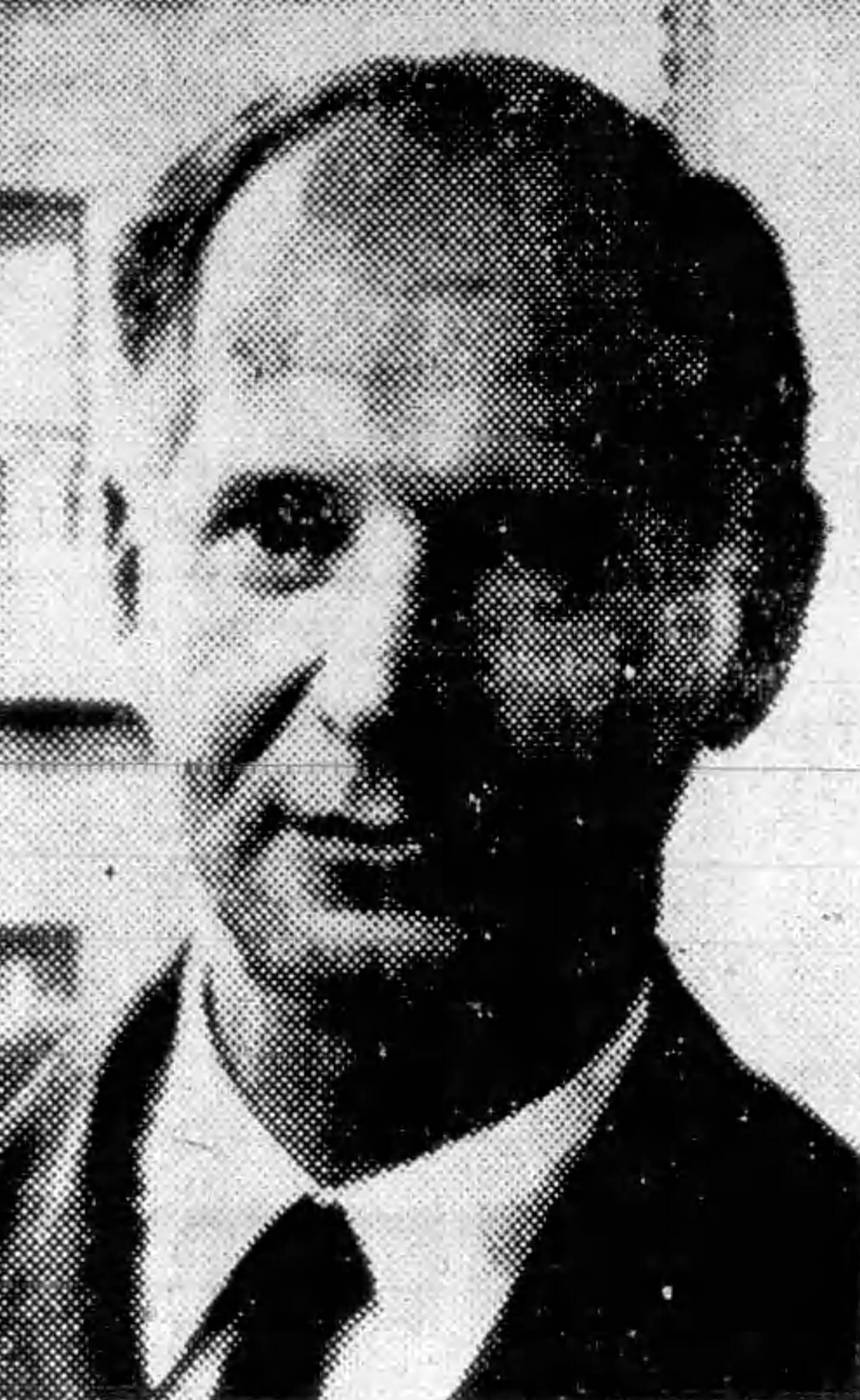
- London c. 1961
- Born: June 17, 1911; New York City, New York, U.S.
- Died: June 12, 1990 (aged 78); New York City, New York, U.S.
- Occupation: Lawyer
- Years active: 1934–1990
- Spouse: Pearl Levison
- Children: Peter; Sheila
- Relatives: Meyer London (uncle); Harriet Fraad (niece); Rosalyn Baxandall (niece)

Ephraim S. London (June 17, 1911 – June 12, 1990) was an American attorney and law professor specializing in constitutional law who established a reputation as a defender of free speech and civil liberties. He taught constitutional law at the New York University School of Law, his alma mater. He wrote The World of Law, a textbook that was widely used in law schools. He was also the author of The Law as Literature.

== Early life ==
London was born to a Jewish family in Brooklyn, New York, to parents Horace London and Rosalind "Rae" London (née Safran).

He graduated from NYU School of Law in 1934, and after graduation, went to work for the law firm run by his father, his mother and his uncle, U.S. Representative Meyer London, who belonged to the Socialist Party of America. His law career was interrupted by service as an Army officer during World War II, then a stint as a special investigator in post-war Germany for the United Nations War Crimes Commission investigating Nazis.

== Movie censorship ==
Taking on movie censorship cases, London won all nine cases he argued before the U.S. Supreme Court, including The Miracle (1948) and Lady Chatterley's Lover (1955), which had been banned in New York in 1950 and in 1956, respectively. The first case, Joseph Burstyn, Inc. v. Wilson, was a landmark case in which the Supreme Court overturned its 1915 precedent in Mutual Film Corporation v. Industrial Commission of Ohio that movies were merely a business, and did not have free speech protection under the First Amendment. The Court ruled that provisions of the New York State law allowing censors to ban motion pictures they determined to be "sacrilegious" violated the First Amendment as a restraint on free speech.

With the case Kingsley International Pictures Corp. v. Regents of the University of the State of New York, London won further constitutional protection for the movies. In 1959, the Supreme Court ruled that the New York State censors' ban on the 1955 French film Lady Chatterley's Lover based on the grounds that it promoted adultery was unconstitutional, as the New York statute violated the freedom to advocate ideas, a right guaranteed by the First and Fourteenth Amendments.

== Civil liberties ==
London defended Lenny Bruce after a 1964 arrest. Bruce and Cafe Au Go Go owner Howard Solomon were twice charged with obscenity by New York City police and were subsequently convicted. Bruce was allowed to be free on bail while London appealed the case. Solomon's conviction was overturned on appeal, but Bruce died before the appeal was adjudicated.

London also won a prominent First Amendment case, in which he was successful in getting Brooklyn College to reinstate Dr. Harry Slochower, whom the college has dismissed when he invoked his Fifth Amendment right against self-incrimination during questioning by a Congressional subcommittee investigating communism. The Supreme Court upheld Slochower's right to use the Fifth. (Slochower v. Board of Higher Education of New York City) He was less successful handling the appeal of Dr. Robert Soblen, a convicted Soviet spy, when Soblen fled to Israel while London was handling his appeal in 1962, necessitating the forfeiture of $60,000 in bail raised by his law partner, Helen Lehman Buttenweiser (equivalent to approximately $638,614 in 2025 dollars). Soblen eventually killed himself when he was deported by Israel.

In a change of pace, he brought Lillian Hellman's libel suit against Mary McCarthy to court. It was dismissed as moot when Hellman died in 1984.

== Death ==
London died in New York City on June 12, 1990, of complications from Shy–Drager syndrome. He was 79 years old.

He was survived by his wife, the former Pearl Levison; a son, Peter, of Manhattan; and a sister, Irma Fraad, of Riverdale, the Bronx.

He was also survived by a daughter he had outside of marriage, Sheila Michaels, a remarkable activist in her own right, whom he never publicly acknowledged.

London also had two nieces, Fraad's daughters Harriet, and Rosalyn, who was previously married to Lee Baxandall. Rosalyn is also deceased.
