= Harriet Fraad =

American feminist activist and psychotherapist

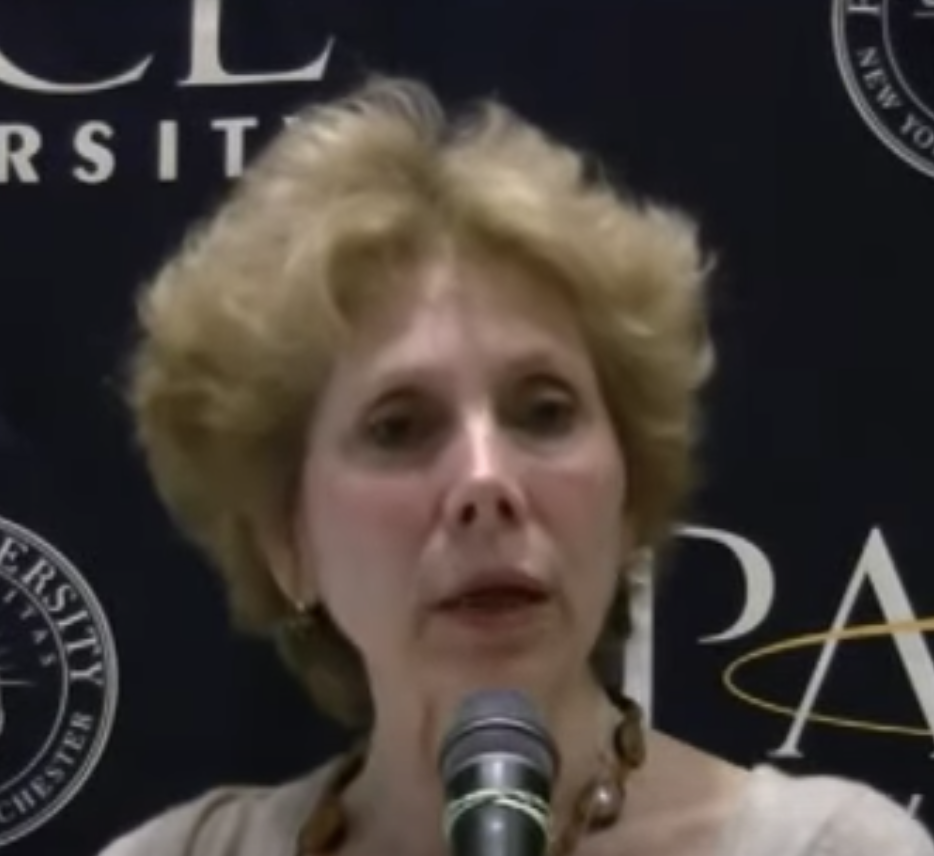
Fraad speaking in 2011.

Harriet Louise Fraad (born August 19, 1941) is an American feminist activist, psychotherapist and hypnotherapist in New York City. She has been practicing as a psychotherapist and hypnotherapist for 37 years. She is said to be a founding member of the Feminist movement, owed in part to her founding of the Women's Liberation Movement in 1968. She is the founder of the journal Rethinking Marxism and specializes in writing about the intersection between economics and psychology.

== Personal life ==
Harriet Louise Fraad was born to Jewish parents, Lewis M. Fraad, a pediatrician, and Irma London, who both had leftist sympathies. She is married to Marxian economist and intellectual Richard D. Wolff. Wolff and Fraad have two children together. She and Wolff co-write for Economy and Psychology, a blog on the interface of those two topics. She has two sisters, Julie Fraad and Rosalyn Baxandall.

Her father worked for the Comintern in Vienna from 1932 to 1936 and was a member of the Communist Party of America from 1929 to 1957. Her maternal grandfather was Horace London, the brother and campaign manager of Meyer London, later a U.S. Representative. An activist her entire life, Fraad has contributed to works and been a founding member in movements like the second-wave women's movement. She gives regular talks on the Julianna Forlano Morning show on WBAI, MK Mendoza on KSFR, and Women's Spaces on WBBK. The latest work she contributed to was Knowledge, Class, and Economics: Marxism without Guarantees.

Fraad's uncle was Ephraim London, Irma's brother, and through him, her maternal cousin was Sheila Michaels, a feminist and activist, whom Ephraim never publicly acknowledged as his daughter.

== In media ==
=== Books ===
- Class Struggle on the Home Front, (w/Stephen Resnick & Richard Wolff), New York: Palgrave Macmillan, 2009
- Imagine Living in a Socialist USA: Imagine…Personal Emotional and Sexual Life Without Capitalism (w/Tess Fraad Wolff), (Edited F. Goldin, D. & S. Smith), New York: HarperCollins, Jan 2014.
- Bringing It All Back Home by Harriet Fraad, Richard Wolff, et al. | Apr 1, 1994
- Rethinking Marxism (Vol 9 | No. 4 | 1996/97) by "At Home with Incest" by Harriet Fraad, " Juha Koivisto and Veikko Pietila on W. F. Haug and Projekt Ideologie-Theorie, Roby Rajan Henry A. Giroux on Paulo Freire, | Jan 1, 1996

=== Selected articles and publications ===
- Gender and the Presidential Election, Coop Talk, Democracy at Work, Dec 2016
- Mass Killings: Why Americans Are "Going Postal" Truthout, Jan 2013
- Capitalism Works for me (or Not) for Me, (w/Richard Wolff), Truthout, Oct 2013
- The Feminist Movement: What Happened and Why, Tikkun Magazine, Feb 2013
- Capitalist Profit and Intimate Life, The Journal of Psychohistory, Jan 2013
- The Obama Election: Lessons for A Political Movement, Truthout, Nov 2012
- Living Alone: The Rise of Capitalism and the Decline of Families, Truthout, Oct 2012
- What's Wrong with America? 12 Steps Towards Change, Rethinking Marxism, Apr 2012
- Village Abuse: It Takes a Village The Journal of Psychohistory, Jan 2012
- Some Relationship Counseling for Feminism and the Left Truthout, Apr 2012
- Profiting from Mental Ill Health The Guardian, Mar 2011
- Capitalism and Loneliness: Why Pornography Is a Multibillion Dollar Industry (w/Tess Fraad Wolff), Truthout, Dec 2011
- Where Is Home: A Revolution in Our Personal Lives Tikkun, Oct 2011
- The Pursuit of Happiness Tikkun, Summer 2011
- American Depression Tikkun, Jan/Feb Winter 2010
- What's Really Behind The Catholic Church's Abuse Problem, Alternet, May 2010
- Why Are American's Passive As Millions Lose Their Homes, Jobs, Families, & The American Dream?, Alternet, Feb 2010

=== Podcasts ===
- Capitalism Hits Home with Dr. Harriet Fraad and Julianna Forlano
- It's Not Just in Your Head
- Regular guest on Economic Update with Richard D. Wolff
- Regular guest on The David Feldman Show
- Interpersonal Update (w/Tess Fraad Wolff), formerly broadcast on WBAI-FM, New York, Thursdays, 1-2PM EST
