= Meyer London =

American politician (1871–1926)

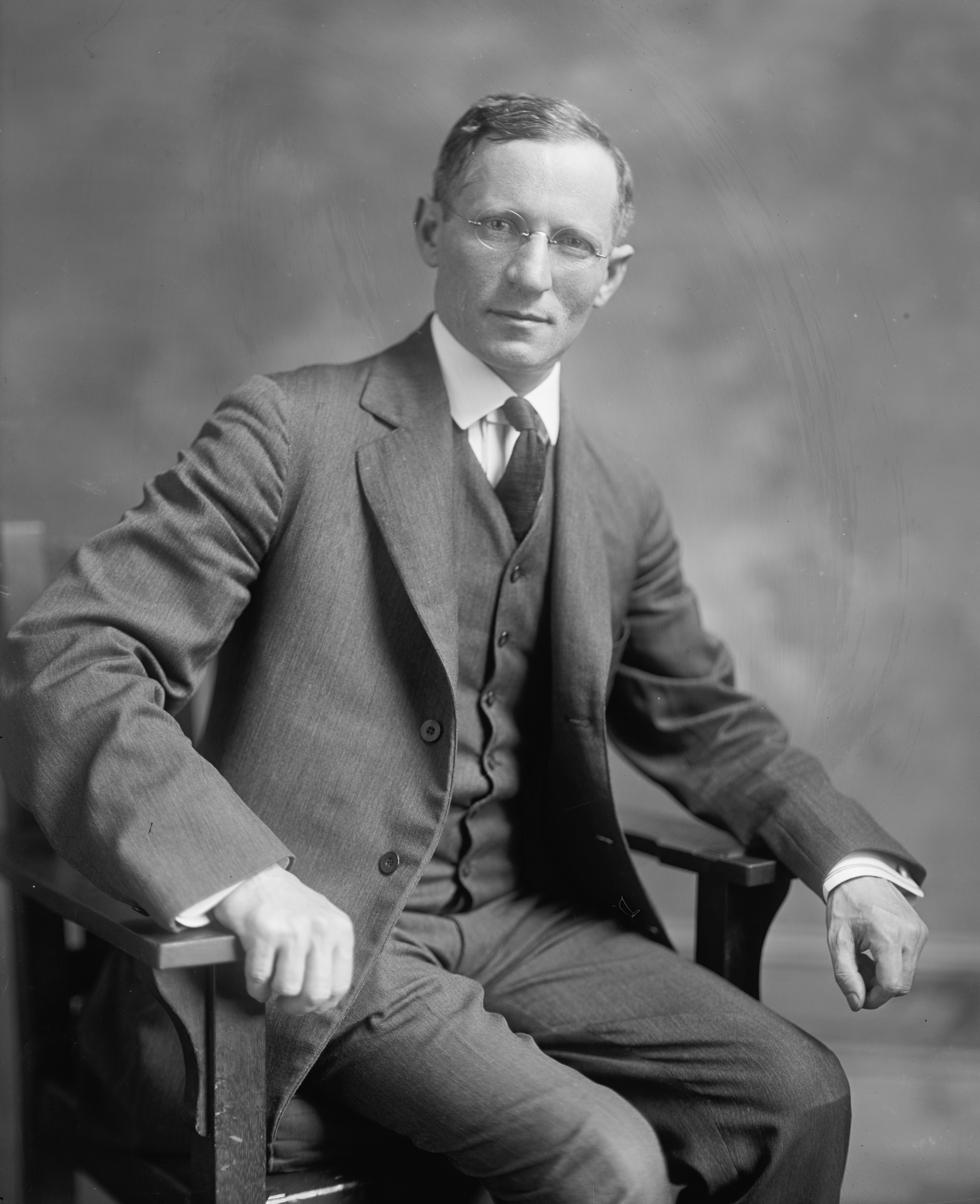
- Portrait by Harris & Ewing c. 1915–1923

Member of the U.S. House of Representatives from New York's 12th district
- In office March 4, 1921 – March 3, 1923
- Preceded by: Henry M. Goldfogle
- Succeeded by: Samuel Dickstein
- In office March 4, 1915 – March 3, 1919
- Preceded by: Henry M. Goldfogle
- Succeeded by: Henry M. Goldfogle

Personal details
- Born: December 29, 1871 Kalvarija, Congress Poland, Russian Empire
- Died: June 6, 1926 (aged 54) New York City, U.S.
- Resting place: Mount Carmel Cemetery
- Party: Socialist Labor (before 1897); Social Democracy (1897–1898); Social Democratic (1898–1901); Socialist (after 1901)
- Spouse: Anna Rosenson (m. 1899)
- Children: Isabel
- Relatives: Ephraim London (nephew); Sheila Michaels (grandniece); Rosalyn Baxandall (grandniece); Harriet Fraad (grandniece)
- Education: New York University Law School

Meyer London (Note: Yiddish: מאיר לאָנדאָן) (December 29, 1871 – June 6, 1926) was a Lithuanian-born Jewish American lawyer and politician from New York City. He was legal counsel to the International Ladies' Garment Workers' Union during the 1910 New York Cloakmakers strike. He represented the Lower East Side of Manhattan for two nonconsecutive terms and was one of only two members of the Socialist Party of America elected to the United States Congress. His opposition to American entry into World War I and his refusal to introduce a congressional resolution supporting the creation of a Jewish state in Palestine created controversy that limited his political career. In the December 7, 1917 vote to declare war against the Austro-Hungarian Empire, the Senate was unanimous, 74–0, while the vote in the House was 350–1, with London being the sole member of Congress to vote against.

== Early life and education ==
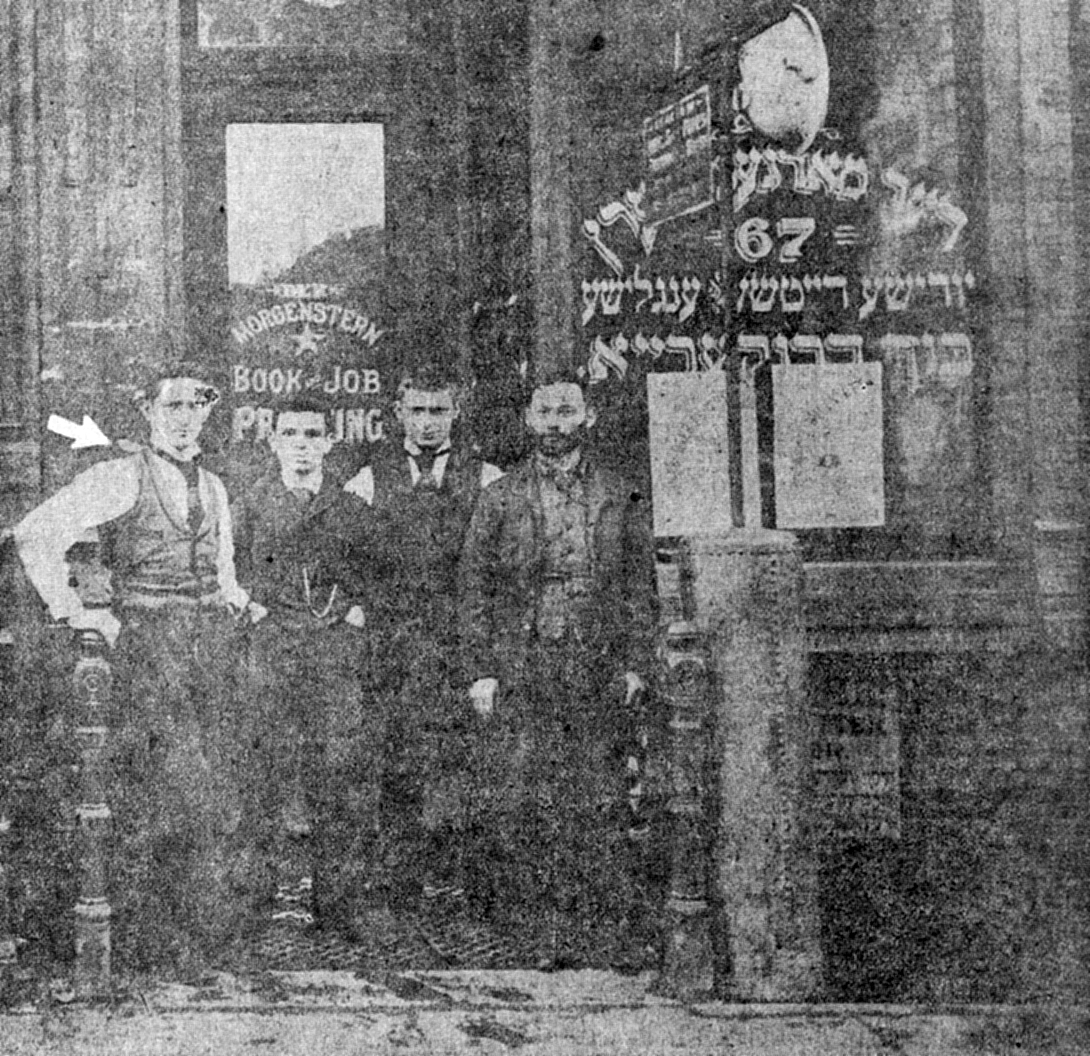
London (far left) in front of his father's printing shop c. 1891

Meyer London was born in Kalvarija, Lithuania (then part of the Russian Empire) on December 29, 1871. His father, Efraim London, was a former Talmudic scholar who had become politically revolutionary and philosophically agnostic, while his mother had remained a devotee of Judaism. His father had established himself as a grain merchant in Zenkov, a small town located in the Poltava province of Ukraine, but his financial situation was poor, and in 1888 his father immigrated with London's younger brother to the United States, leaving him behind.

London attended Cheder, a traditional Jewish primary school in which he learned Hebrew, before entering Russian-language schools to begin his secular education. In 1891, when London was 20, the family decided to follow his father to America, so London terminated his studies and departed for New York City, taking up residence in the city's largely Jewish Lower East Side.

In America, London's father had become a commercial printer, doing jobs in the Yiddish, Russian, and English languages and publishing his own radical weekly called Morgenstern. Efraim London's shop was a hub of activity, bringing together Jewish radical intellectuals from throughout the city, many of whom met and influenced the printer's son with their ideas.

London earned money as a tutor, taking on pupils at irregular hours and teaching literature and other topics. He later obtained a job as a librarian, a position which allowed him sufficient time to read about history and politics and to study law in his free time. London also frequented radical meetings, gradually developing proficiency as a public speaker and participant in public debates.

In 1896, London was accepted to the law school of New York University, attending most of his classes at night. He completed the program and was admitted to the bar in New York in 1898, becoming a labor lawyer, taking on cases which fought injunctions or defending the rights of tenants against the transgressions of landlords. London did not handle criminal cases, but rather limited himself to matters of civil law.

== Career ==
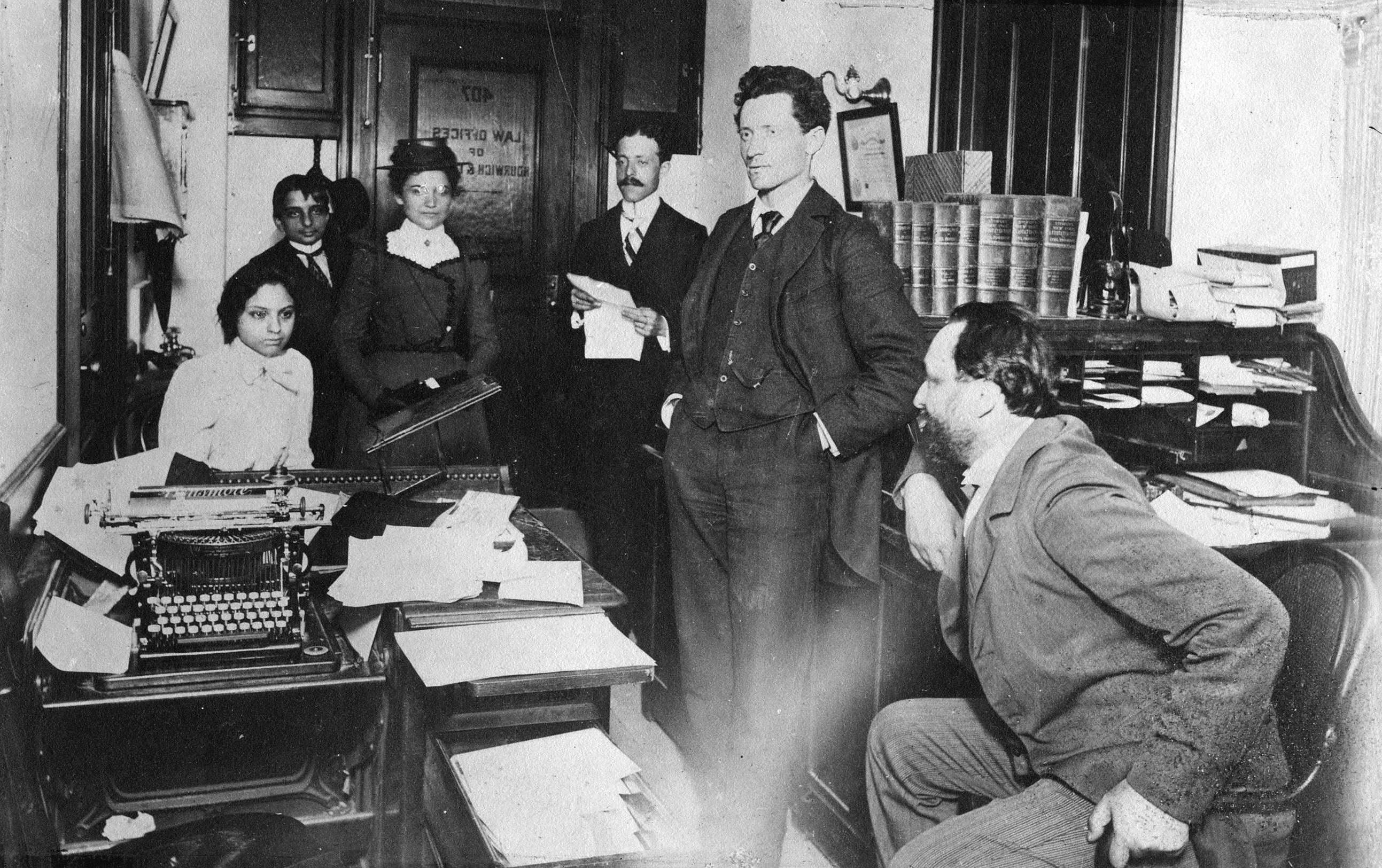
London (standing, right) and his wife visit the law office of Isaac Hourwich c. 1893–1900

In the 1890s, London joined the Socialist Labor Party of America (SLP), standing as its candidate for New York State Assembly in 1896. He was attracted by Eugene V. Debs and his new Social Democracy of America (SDA) and resigned from the SLP to help establish Local Branch No. 1 of the Social Democracy in New York in 1897. He was a delegate to the June 1898 convention of SDA in Chicago and was one of the political action-oriented minority which bolted the June 1898 convention to establish the Social Democratic Party of America (SDP) following a dispute over the strategy of socialist colonization.

In 1898, London again ran for New York Assembly in the old 4th Assembly District, this time as the candidate of the SDP.

In the summer of 1901, the Chicago-based SDP merged with another group of former adherents of the Socialist Labor Party to form the Socialist Party of America (SPA), and London transferred his political allegiance to the new organization. He ran for a third time for the 4th Assembly District seat in 1904, this time under the banner of the SPA.

The Russian Revolution of 1905 was deeply inspirational to the former citizen of the Tsarist regime, and London threw himself into the task of speaking to mass meetings organized to help raise funds for the relief of Jewish victims of the pogroms which erupted at that same time. London also engaged in fund-raising on behalf of the Bund, the Yiddish-language revolutionary movement in regions with significant Jewish populations in the old Russian Empire.

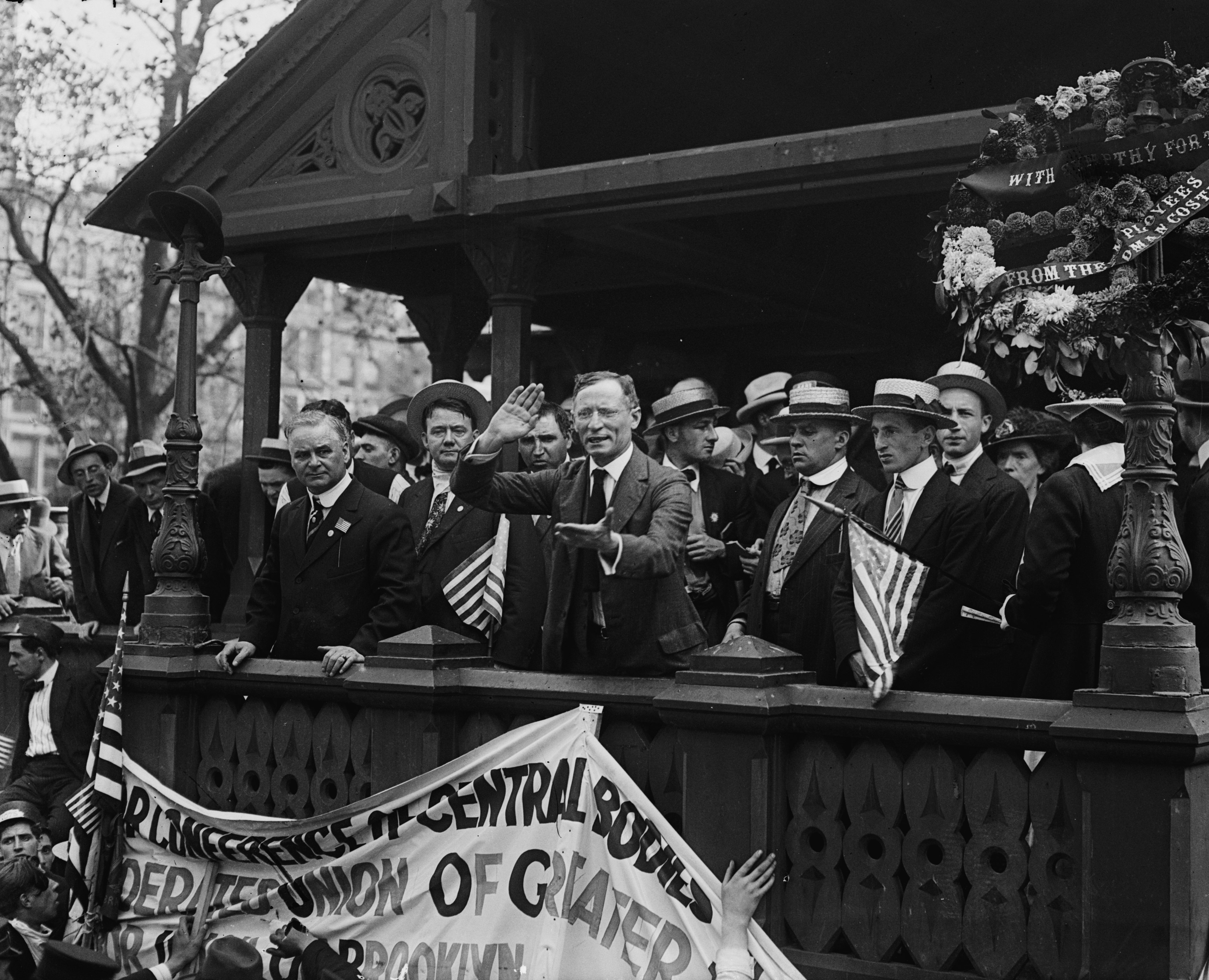
Congressman Meyer London at a rally for striking Brooklyn streetcar workers, 1916

London was active in the 1910 New York Cloakmakers strike, during which the International Ladies' Garment Workers' Union (ILGWU) brought out 50,000 in a successful struggle for higher wages and better work conditions against their employers. In his capacity as counsel for the ILGWU, London drew up and published a communique in the name of the strike committee. In this manifesto, London declared:

We charge the employers with ruining the great trade built up by the industrious immigrants. We charge them with having corrupted the morale of thousands employed in the cloak trade. ... Treachery, slavishness and espionage are encouraged by the employers as great virtues of the cloakmakers. This general strike is greater than any union. It is an irresistible movement of the people. It is a protest against conditions that can no longer be tolerated. This is the first great attempt to regulate conditions in the trade, to do away with that anarchy and chaos which keeps some of the men working sixteen hours a day during the hottest months of the year while thousands of others have no employment whatever. ... We appeal to the people of America to assist us in our struggle.

London argued against an injunction issued against the strikers before the New York Supreme Court en route to a victory of the strikers after a labor action lasting the better part of two months.

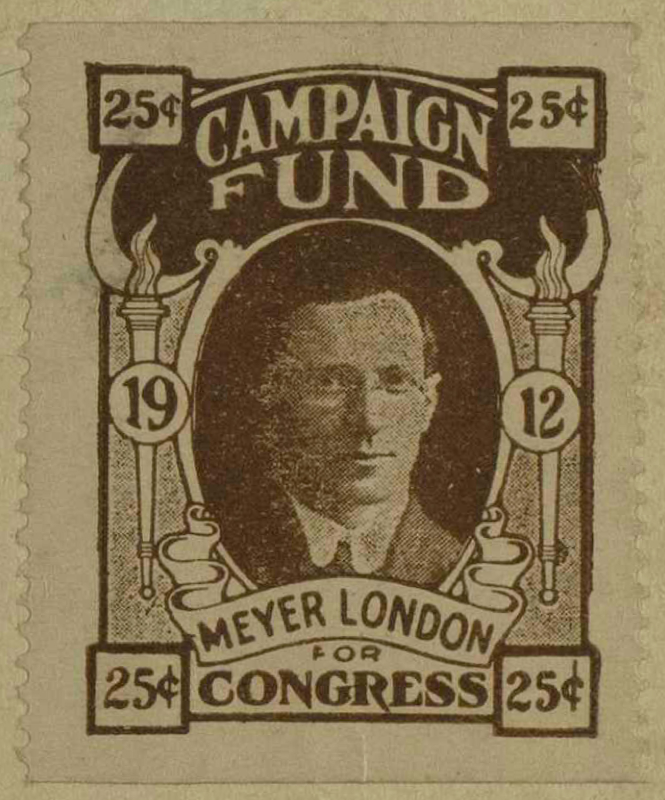
Meyer London for Congress 25 cent campaign fund stamp, 1912

London's place in the cloakmakers' strike made him one of the best-known public faces of the Socialist Party in New York City and over the course of three runs for Congress he gradually constructed a winning coalition, emerging victorious despite the violence and fraud practiced by the campaign of his Tammany Hall-supported Democratic opponent in the election of 1914. London thus became the second Socialist elected to Congress, following Wisconsin's Victor Berger.

=== U.S. Congress ===
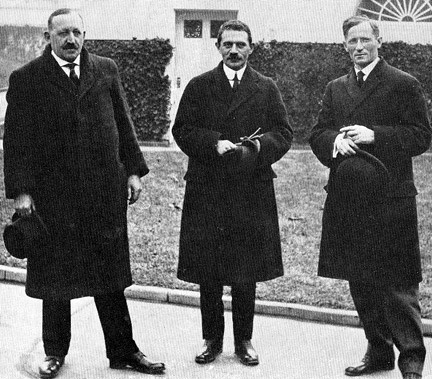
In January 1916, London was joined by Socialist Party leaders James Maurer (left) and Morris Hillquit (center) in a meeting with President Woodrow Wilson trying to forestall American entry into World War I

As a Congressman, Meyer London was one of 50 representatives and six senators to vote against entry into World War I. Once America was at war, however, London felt obliged to support the nation's efforts in the conflict. He strongly opposed the Espionage Act of 1917 and the Sedition Act of 1918, which made criticism of the president or the war a crime, and in the end cast the only vote in the House against the Sedition Act of 1918. These actions angered his constituency but London said: "I wonder whether I am to be punished for having had the courage to vote against the war or for standing by my country's decision when it chose war."

London's support of the Wilson administration's war effort enraged many within the Socialist Party, who saw London's actions as a rank betrayal of the party's anti-militarist program. In a statement to members of the Socialist Party, London's radical opponents chronicled his transgressions:

He ignored the St. Louis Resolution right after it was adopted. He refused to introduce bills suggested by the National Executive Committee. He neglected every opportunity of manifesting the attitude of the Socialist Party ... When London sent his famous telegram to Russia not to conclude a separate peace, a good many of us felt that he ought to be recalled from Congress. If we had no courage to recall him then, let us have courage now to reconsider his nomination.

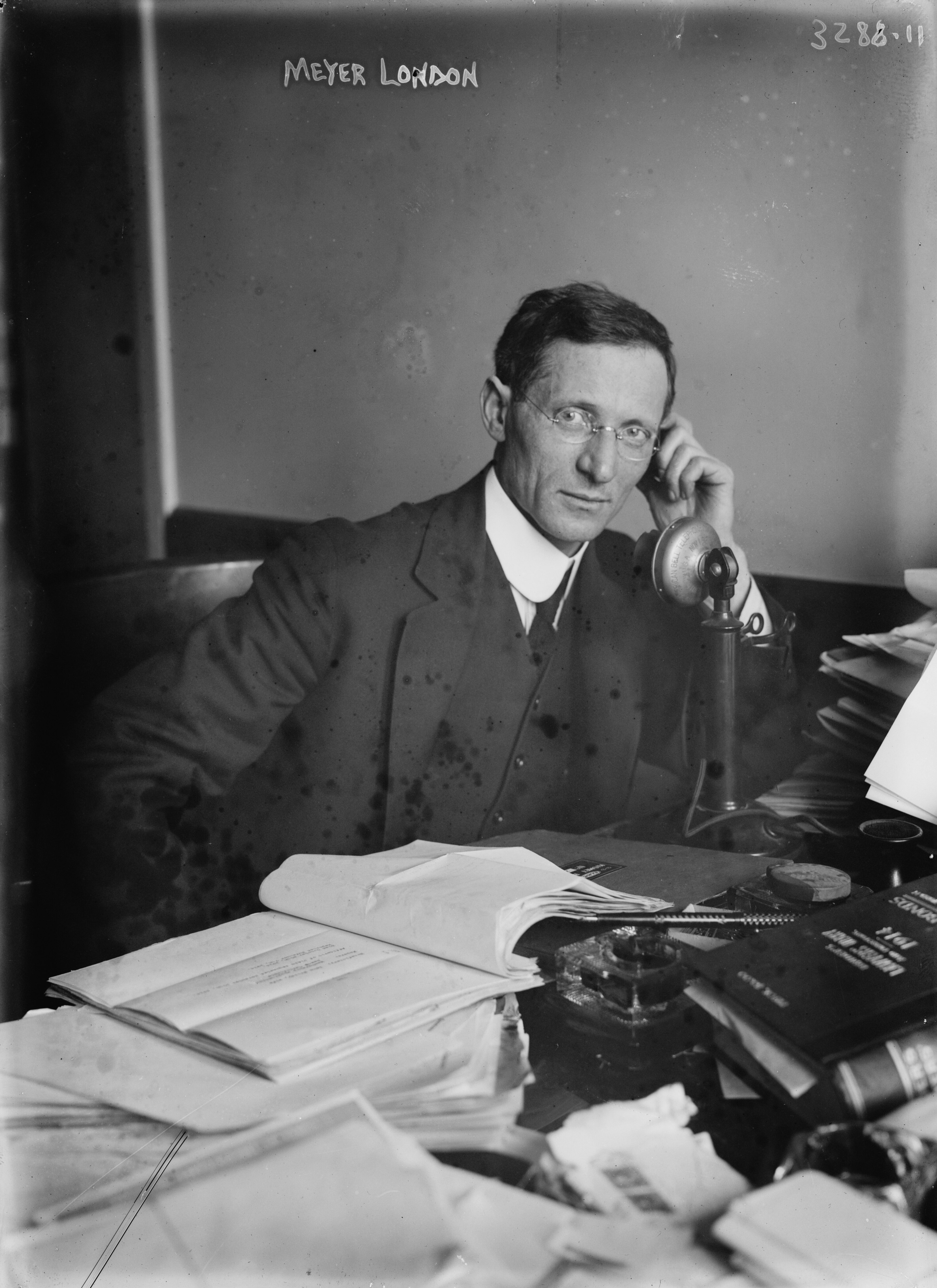
London at his desk c. 1910s

As a Jewish Socialist, London's position on Zionism further complicated his political situation. Although he upset socialist Labor Zionists by refusing to introduce a resolution endorsing the Balfour Declaration into the House of Representatives, London did not oppose the right of Jews to live "a separate and distinct national existence fortified by a Jewish state ... All that I ask of them is that they should not speak in the name of all Jews." Further, London believed in the possibility of a specifically socialist Jewish state, so long as it "can be accomplished without violating the Socialist principle which forbids forcible annexation." However, London's refusal to introduce the resolution united many Zionists against him. The Jewish community was further fragmented in opposition to London, with Orthodox Jews advocating his defeat because he was not religious while rich and powerful Jews worked against him because he was a socialist. Uptown Jews like Jacob Schiff, Louis Marshall, Nathan Straus, and Rabbi Stephen S. Wise urged the Jews to redeem themselves by rejecting London.

London was thus placed in the uncomfortable position of simultaneously being attacked both as a dangerous radical on the one hand and as a collaborationist traitor to radicalism on the other; as un-American and pro-German on the one hand and as an American nationalist and abettor of militarism on the other; for subsuming the Socialist program in the interest of the Jews in his district on the one hand and for neglecting the sweeping desire for Jewish nationhood in the interests of socialist internationalism on the other. This proved too much even for the powers of political incumbency to overcome. With the Democratic and Republican parties united behind a single "fusion" candidate and his own supporters fragmented, London narrowly lost reelection in 1918, falling to Henry M. Goldfogle by a tally of 7,269 to 6,519.

Two years later, in 1920, the Lower East Side sent London back to Congress. The vote was 10,212 for London to 8,054 for Goldfogle. In Israel and the American National Interest, Cheryl A. Rubenberg states: "On September 21, 1922, the American Congress passed a joint resolution stating its support for a homeland in Palestine for the Jewish people". He was defeated for reelection two years later by Samuel Dickstein.

During his time in Congress, London submitted a resolution in the House of Representatives calling for a commission to be appointed to plan for combating unemployment and set up a national insurance fund. London’s resolution, which faced opposition from both organized labor and the insurance industry, failed to pass, with 138 votes against, 106 abstentions, and only 189 House representatives voting in favor of it, while no further action was taken on the resolution despite remaining on the House calendar.

== Personal life and death ==
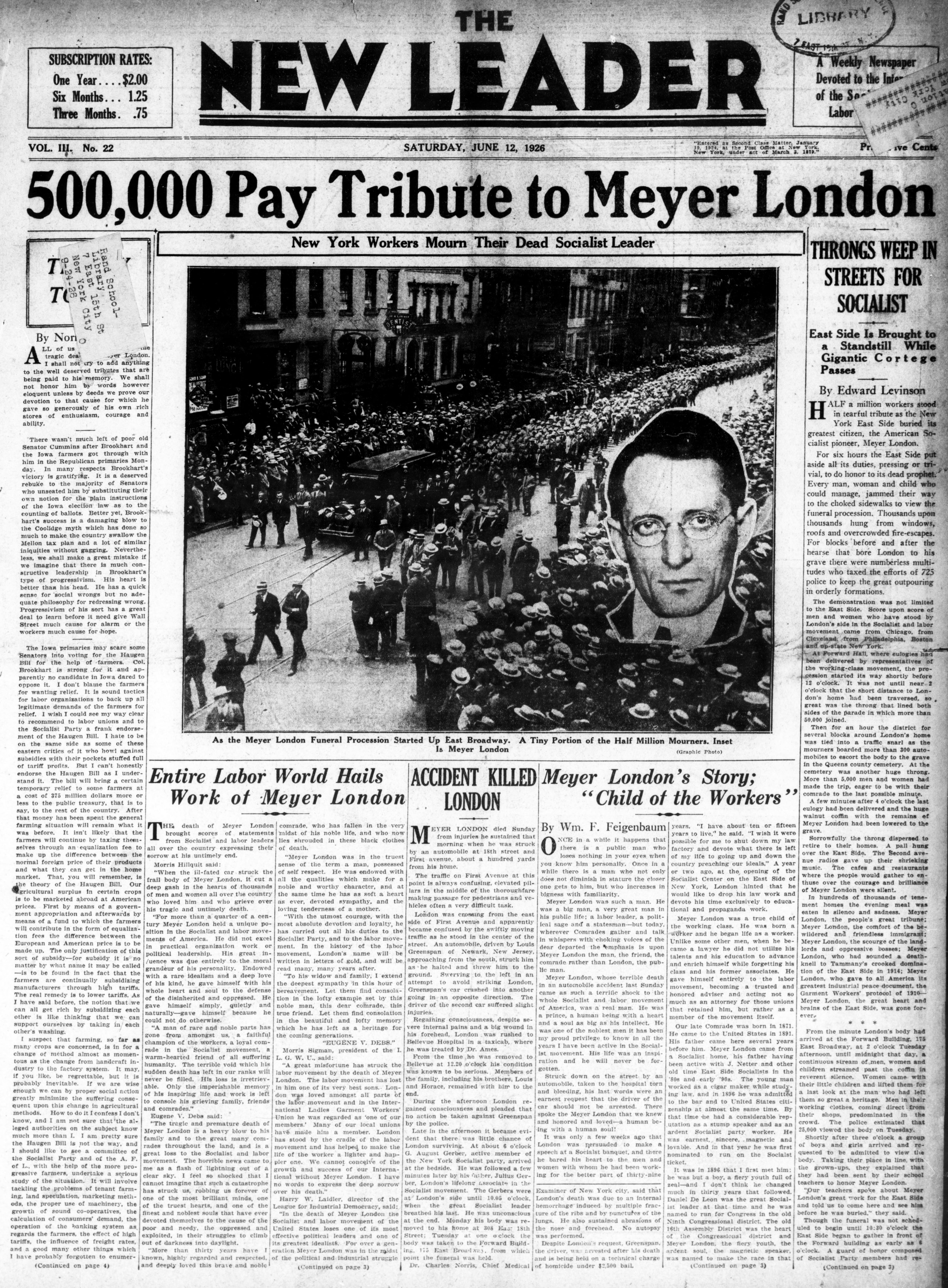
Front page of The New Leader, June 12, 1926, depicting London's funeral procession

London married Anna Rosenson, a dentist who was a fellow Socialist and immigrant from the Russian Empire, in 1899. They had one daughter together, Isabel, who became a physician. His nephew was Ephraim London, a constitutional lawyer. Through Ephraim, his nieces were Harriet Fraad and Rosalyn Baxandall and grandniece was activist Sheila Michaels.

London died on Sunday, June 6, 1926. As he was crossing Second Avenue at 15th Street, he was caught in the middle of heavy automobile traffic passing in both directions. London became confused and when he halted in the middle of the road he was struck by a driver of a car, suffering internal injuries. The driver rushed him to Bellevue Hospital, where London's daughter was an intern. When she saw her father, London's only concern was that the driver not be punished. "It's not his fault", said London "and he is a poor man." London died at 10 o'clock that night at the age of 54, after physicians had labored for 11 hours to save him.

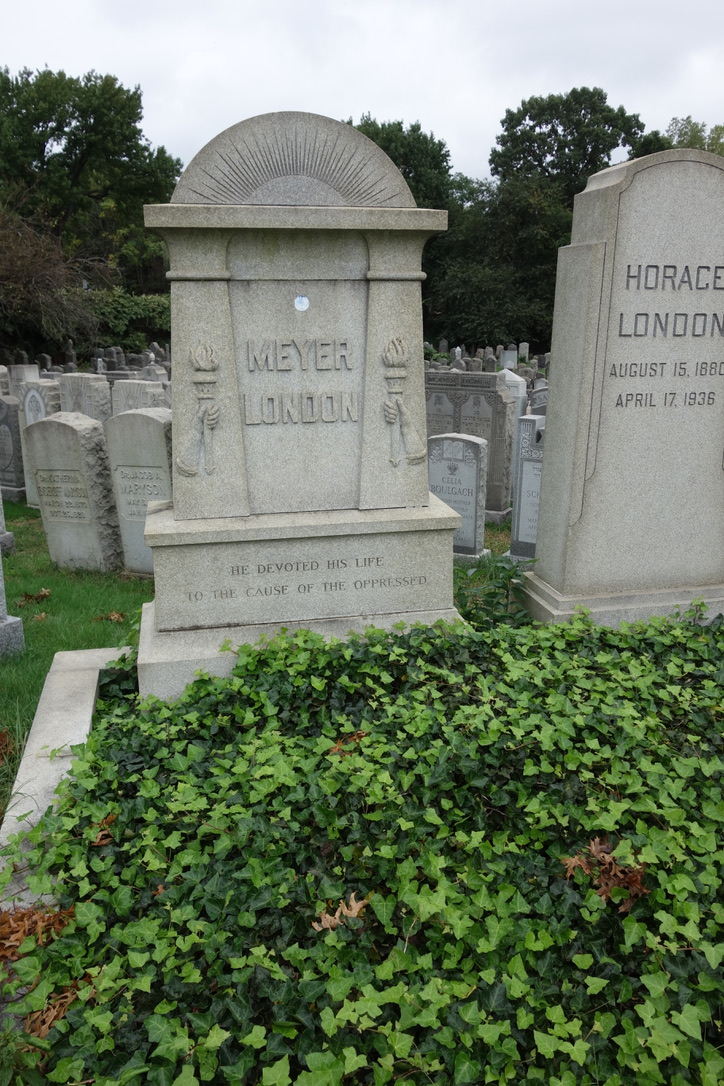
London's grave at Mount Carmel Cemetery in Glendale, New York

News immediately began to spread about the death of the beloved Congressman and crowds immediately began to gather in front of the hospital, the Londons' home, and the building of The Jewish Daily Forward newspaper. The next day, London's body was taken to the Forward building, where it lay in state while 25,000 men, women, and children filed past the casket, paying their respects. A funeral followed on Wednesday, June 10, one of the greatest mass displays of mourning in New York City's history, witnessed by an estimated 500,000 people. The streets were jammed with a procession of 50,000 people, as hundreds of thousands crowded windows and hung from fire escapes or stood along the procession route in a crowd jammed six people deep.

London's body was interred at Mount Carmel Cemetery in Glendale, New York, in the borough of Queens.

== Legacy ==
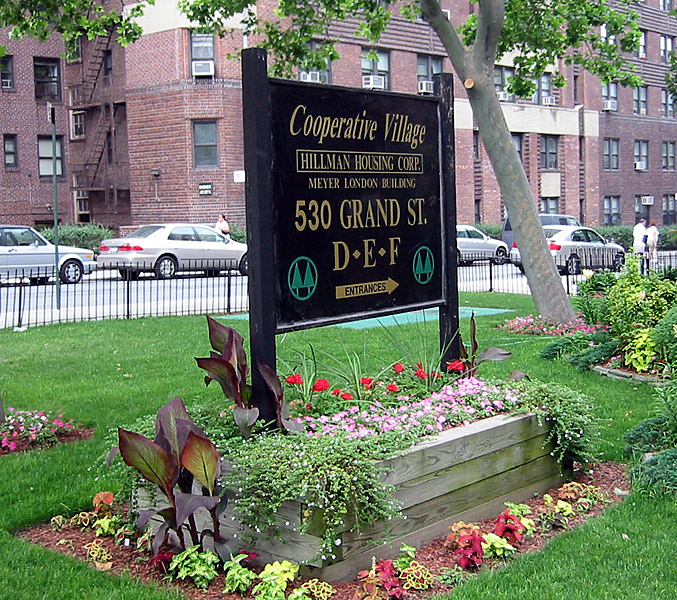
Sign outside the Meyer London Building in Manhattan's Cooperative Village

In spite of his votes against the previous world war, London became the namesake of a World War II Liberty ship, the SS Meyer London, launched in 1943.

One of the buildings of Hillman Housing Corporation, a housing cooperative founded by the Amalgamated Clothing Workers of America, on the Lower East Side of Manhattan is named after him. There is also a K-5 elementary school located on the Lower East Side named after Meyer London, also known as P.S. 2.

In an article for The New York Review of Books, historian Tony Judt writes that London is a relative of his: "Our cousin Meyer London had emigrated in 1891 to New York from a nearby village; there he was elected in 1914 as the second Socialist congressman before being ousted by an ignominious alliance of wealthy New York Jews disturbed by his socialism and American Zionists aghast at his well-publicized suspicion of their project."

== Works ==
=== Books and pamphlets ===
- Joint Resolution, Calling Upon the President of the United States to Convene a Congress of Neutral Nations to Offer Mediation to the Belligerents in Europe ... Washington, DC: US Government Printing Office, 1915.
- "Preparedness": Its Dangers: A Socialist View of the Militarist Agitation, in the Light of the European War, with a Plea for Mediation. Speech of Hon. Meyer London ... in the House of representatives January 18, 1916. Washington, DC: US Government Printing Office, 1916.
- National Honor: Speech of Hon. Meyer London of New York in the House of Representatives, March 6, 1916. Washington, DC: US Government Printing Office, 1916.
- Abraham Lincoln, a World Force: Speech ... in the House of Representatives, Feb. 12, 1918. Washington, DC: US Government Printing Office, 1918.
- International Socialism and the Inter-Allied War Aims: Speech of the Hon. Meyer London of New York in the House of Representatives, Wednesday, May 1, 1918. Washington, DC: US Government Printing Office, 1918.

=== Articles ===
- "Socialism and the Terms of Peace," Proceedings of the Academy of Political Science in the City of New York, vol. 7, no. 2 (July 1917), pp. 97–101.

== See also ==
- List of Jewish members of the United States Congress

== Notes ==
U.S. House of Representatives
Preceded by Henry M. Goldfogle	Member of the U.S. House of Representatives from New York's 12th congressional district 1915–1919	Succeeded by Henry M. Goldfogle
Preceded by Henry M. Goldfogle	Member of the U.S. House of Representatives from New York's 12th congressional district 1921–1923	Succeeded by Samuel Dickstein
