= Sheila Michaels =

American feminist (1939 –2017)

- Born: Sheila Babs Michaels; May 8, 1939; St. Louis, Missouri, U.S.
- Died: June 22, 2017 (aged 78); New York City, U.S.
- Other names: Sheila Kessler; Sheila Shiki-y-Michaels
- Occupation: Feminist
- Years active: mid-1950s to mid-1960s
- Known for: Popularized the term Ms.
- Parents: Ephraim London (father); Alma Weil Michaels (mother)
- Family: Meyer London (granduncle); Harriet Fraad (cousin); Rosalyn Baxandall (cousin)

Sheila Babs Michaels, also known as Sheila Shiki-y-Michaels (May 8, 1939 – June 22, 2017), was an American feminist and civil rights activist credited with popularizing Ms. as a default form of address for women regardless of their marital status.

== Early life ==
Michaels was born in St. Louis, Missouri, to Alma Weil Michaels (née Weil), a playwright and theatrical producer, and Ephraim London, a civil rights attorney from New York City, who never acknowledged Michaels as his daughter. Michaels' mother was at that time separated from her husband, Maurice "Bill" Michaels, a shoe representative for Edison Brothers Stores in St. Louis.

Her mother did not want to live with a young child, so three-year-old Michaels was sent to New York City to live with her maternal grandparents, Irving Weil and Frances (Feigela) Weil (née Sacks), in the Bronx. When she was about eight years old, she was returned to live with her mother and her mother's second husband, a wealthy metallurgist, Harry H. Kessler. She was also given the last name Kessler. Many years later, her mother and Harry Kessler, disapproving of her political activism, disowned her and asked her to stop using the Kessler name. As a result, she changed back to Michaels.

In 1957, she graduated from high school in St. Louis. After high school she attended College of William & Mary but was expelled in part for writing anti-segregationist articles for the student newspaper. After a period of time living in St. Louis working entry-level jobs, Michaels moved to New York City in October 1959.

== Career and activism ==
Michaels was a member of the Congress of Racial Equality.

In 1961, she attempted to put the term Ms. into use when she saw what she thought was a typographical error on the address label of a copy of News & Letters sent to her roommate. Michaels "was looking for a title for a woman who did not 'belong' to a man." She knew the separation of the now common terms Miss and Mrs. had derived from Mistress, but one could not suggest that women use the original title with its now louche connotations. Her efforts to promote use of a new honorific were at first ignored. In 1969, in a lull during a WBAI-radio interview with The Feminists group, Michaels suggested the use of Ms. A friend of Gloria Steinem heard the interview and suggested it as a title for her new magazine. The magazine Ms. debuted on newsstands in January 1972, and its much-publicized name quickly led to widespread usage.

In 1975, Michaels went to Laos, working with children injured during the Vietnam War.

Michaels also worked as an oral historian where she interviewed members of Congress of Racial Equality (CORE). She also drove a taxi in New York City for ten years, and ran a Japanese restaurant with her husband. She wrote short observational items about her taxi passengers for New York magazine.

The papers of Sheila Michaels are archived in the McCain Library, University of Southern Mississippi.

== Personal life ==
Michaels traveled and worked in Singapore, Turkey, India, Laos, Korea and Japan. Michaels was married to Hikaru Shiki, a Japanese chef in New York City. They ran a Japanese restaurant for over 10 years and Michaels changed her name during the marriage. They later divorced.

Michaels died from leukemia on June 22, 2017, aged 78. Through her father, Michaels' granduncle was U.S. Representative Meyer London, and her cousins include sisters Rosalyn Baxandall and Harriet Fraad.

== See also ==
- Mary Hamilton
- Student Nonviolent Coordinating Committee
