= Phineas Baxandall =

American policy analyst

- Born: New York City, New York, U.S.
- Education: Wesleyan University (B.A.); Massachusetts Institute of Technology (PhD)
- Parents: Lee Baxandall (father); Rosalyn Baxandall (mother)

Phineas Baxandall is a Senior Analyst at the Massachusetts Budget and Policy Center where he focuses on transportation and tax policy in Massachusetts state and local government.

== Early life ==
Phineas Baxandall was born in New York City. He grew up in New York City, where he attended the Bronx High School of Science and co-captained the school's region-leading ultimate frisbee team.

Baxandall received his B.A. in Economics and the College of Social Studies at Wesleyan University in 1989. He received his Ph.D. in Political Science at MIT in 2000. After receiving his doctorate at MIT, he published his dissertation research as a book titled, Constructing Unemployment: The Politics of Joblessness in East and West. The research develops a theory of how unemployment has been defined differently at different times according to the interests of the state and the prevailing norms of employment. The theory is tested through comparative European polling data on unemployment and a comparative history of changing conceptions of unemployment at several historical junctures, including in communist and post-communist Hungary. Baxandall also published several academic articles and book chapters in various issues in political economy.

== Career ==
He taught economics at the University of Economics at the University of Budapest from 1990 to 1991. For the next decade in Boston, he also served as a central member of the editorial collective that managed and provided content for the magazine Dollars & Sense.

Between 2006 and 2015, he directed the Tax & Budget program and the Transportation programs for the United States Public Interest Research Group (U.S. PIRG) and its thirty state affiliates. Earlier, at Harvard University's John F. Kennedy School of Government, Baxandall helped direct the Taubman Center for State and Local Government and the Rappaport Institute for Greater Boston, where he conducted research on state aid to localities, the effects of introducing legalized gambling, performance metrics for local government and other topics. He taught for eight years at Harvard's undergraduate honors program, the Committee for Degrees in Social Studies, where he won several teaching awards.

At U.S. PIRG, he led research and provided strategic direction to state and federal advocacy in four principal areas. First, in authoring a series of reports on transportation trends, as well as related studies on transportation finance and the benefits of expanding public transportation and intercity rail. Second, an examination of the problems associated with corporations and individuals using offshore tax havens and exploiting other tax loopholes, as well as state and federal efforts to fix these problems. Third, work to improve transparency of government spending at the state and city level, including contracting, subsidies, and quasi-public agencies. Fourth, examination of the privatization of infrastructure and public-private partnerships, especially in transportation.

== Personal life ==
Baxandall currently lives outside of Boston.

== Publications ==
- Constructing Unemployment: The Politics of American Joblessness in the East and West (Ashgate Press, 2004). Review articles about the book include: Rudra Sil and Peter J. Katzenstein, “Analytic Eclecticism in the Study of World Politics: Reconfiguring Problems and Mechanisms across Research Traditions,” Perspectives on Politics (June 2010); Pieter Vanhuysse, “Kneeling at the Altar of (Il)-Liberalism: The Politics of Ideas, Job Loss, and Union Weakness in East Central Europe,” International Labor and Working-Class History (Spring 2008); Guglielmo Meardi, “Book Reviews,” Industrial Relations Journal (2007); Nathalia Rogers, Book Review: Constructing Unemployment,” International Sociology (Nov. 2006); and Jack Reardon, "Defining unemployment..." Monthly Labor Studies, U.S. Bureau of Labor Studies (Nov. 2011).

== Other publications ==
- Picking Up the Tab 2014: Average Citizens and Small Businesses Pay the Price for Offshore Tax Shelters with Benjamin Davis, Dan Smith and Tom Van Heeke (U.S. PIRG, April 2014).
- Following the Money 2014: How the 50 States Rate in Providing Online Access to Government Spending Data with Benjamin Davis (U.S. PIRG Education Fund, April 2014), 57pp.
- A New Course: How Innovative University Programs Are Reducing Driving on Campus on Creating New Models of Transportation Policy with Tom Van Heeke and Elise Sullivan (U.S. PIRG Education Fund, February 2014).
- Closing the Billion Dollar Loophole: How States are Reclaiming Revenue Lost to Offshore Tax Havens, with Benjamin Davis, Dan Smith and Tom Van Heeke (U.S. PIRG, January 2014), 29pp.
- Transportation in Transition: Look at Changing Travel Patterns in America’s Biggest Cities with Benjamin Davis (U.S. PIRG Education Fund, December 2013), 62pp.
- A New Way to Go: The Transportation Apps and Vehicle-Sharing Tools that are Giving More Americans the Freedom to Drive Less with Tony Dutzik and Travis Madsen (U.S. PIRG Education Fund, October 2013).
- Moving Off the Road: A State-by-State Analysis of the National Decline in Driving (U.S. PIRG Education Fund, August. 2013).
- A New Direction: Our Changing Relationship with Driving and the Implications for America’s Future, with Tony Dutzik (U.S. PIRG Education Fund, May 2013).
- Picking Up the Tab 2013: Average Citizens and Small Businesses Pay the Price for Offshore Tax Shelters with Dan Smith (U.S. PIRG, April 2013).
- Following the Money 2013: How the 50 States Rate in Providing Online Access to Government Spending Data with Benjamin Davis and Ryan Pierannunzi (U.S. PIRG Education Fund, March 2013), 80pp.
- Getting our Money’s Worth? Promoting Transparency and Accountability for Corporate Tax Subsidies in Massachusetts, with Deidre Cummings and Tom Van Heeke (MASSPIRG Education Fund, February 2013).
- Subsidizing Bad Behavior: How Corporate Legal Settlements for Harming the Public Become Lucrative Tax Write Off, with Recommendations for Reform, with Ryan Pierannunzi (U.S. PIRG Education Fund, January 2013).
- Transparency in City Spending: Rating the Availability of Online Government Data in America's Largest Cities, with Benjamin Davis and Ryan Pierannunzi (U.S. PIRG Education Fund, January 2013).
- Eight Questions About the Future of the Ohio Turnpike: What the Public Should Know, with Tabitha Woodruff (Ohio PIRG Education Fund, Nov. 2012).
- Shining a Light on the Arizona Commerce Authority: The Need for Stronger Transparency and Accountability Standards at the State’s Economic Development Corporation, with Benjamin Davis and Serena Unrein (Arizona PIRG Education Fund, May 2012).
- Picking Up the Tab: Average Americans and Small Business Pay the Price for Offshore Tax Havens with Abigail Caplovitz Field and Dan Smith (U.S. PIRG: April 2012).
- Transportation and the New Generation: Why Young People Are Driving Less and What it Means for Transportation Policy, with Ben Davis and Tony Dutzik (Frontier Group and U.S. PIRG: April 2012), 36 pp.
- Following the Money 2012: How the 50 States Rate in Providing Online Access to Government Spending Data, with Ben Davis and Ryan Pierannunzi (U.S. PIRG: March 2012) 73pp.
- Tax-Increment Financing: The Need for Transparency and Accountability in Economic Development Subsidies, with Rob Kerth (U.S. PIRG: October 2011) 44 pp., reprinted in State Tax Notes, Nov. 2011.
- Caution: Red Light Cameras Ahead: The Risks of Privatizing Traffic Law Enforcement and How to Protect the Public, with Benjamin Davis (U.S. PIRG Education Fund: October 2011), 52 pp.
- High-Speed Rail: Public, Private or Both? Assessing the Prospects, Promise and Pitfalls of Public-Private Partnerships, with Tony Dutzik (U.S.PIRG: July 2011), 40 pp.
- Following the Money 2011: How the 50 States Rate in Providing Online Access to Government Spending Data, with Benjamin Davis and Jeff Musto (U.S.PIRG Education Fund, March 2011), 60 pp.
- Do Roads Pay for Themselves? Setting the Record Straight on Transportation Funding, with Tony Dutzik and Benjamin Davis (U.S.PIRG: January 2011), 40 pp.
- A Track Record of Success: High-Speed Rail Around the World and Its Promise for America, with Tony Dutzik, Jordan Schneider and Erin Steva, (U.S PIRG: October 2010), 48 pp.
- Out of the Shadows: Massachusetts Quasi-Public Agencies and the Need for Budget Transparency with Deidre Cummings and Kari Wohlschlegel (MASSPIRG: Spring 2010), 36 pp.
- Road Work Ahead: Holding America Accountable for Fixing America’s Crumbling Roads and Bridges with Travis Madsen and Benjamin Davis (U.S.PIRG: April 2010) 52 pp.
- Following the Money: How the 50 States Rate in Providing Online Access to Government Spending Data, with Benjamin Davis and Kari Wohlschlegel (U.S.PIRG: April 2010), 44 pp.
- What We Learned from the Stimulus, with Scott Bernstein and William Schroeer (Center for Neighborhood Technology, Smart Growth America, and U.S. PIRG: January 2010), 11 pp.
- The Right Track: Building a 21st Century High-Speed Rail System for America, with Tony Dutzik and Sienna Kaplan (U.S. PIRG: January 2010) 71 pp.
- Privatization and the Public Interest: The Need for Transparency and Accountability in Chicago’s Public Asset Lease Deals, with Tony Dutzik and Brian Imus (Illinois PIRG: Fall 2009), 44 pp.
- Private Roads, Public Costs: The Facts About Toll Road Privatization and How to Protect the Public, with Kari Wohlschlegel and Tony Dutzik (U.S. PIRG: March 2009), pp. 46, with a separate case example booklet, pp. 36.
- California Budget Transparency 2.0: Online Tools for Better Government, with Pedro Morillas, Emily Rusch and Sienna Kaplan (CALPIRG: 2009), 30 pp.
- Economic Stimulus or Simply More Misguided Spending: How Outdated Transportation Wish Lists Sent by States to Congress Ignore Current Trends and Neglect National Priorities (U.S. PIRG: December 2008), 9 pp.
- Squandering the Stimulus: An Analysis of Household Gas Spending, Economic Stimulus Checks, and the Need for Better Transportation Options, with M. Michael Farhoodi (U.S. PIRG: June 2008), 9 pp.
- A Better Way to Go: Meeting America’s 21st Century Transportation with Modern Public Transit, with Tony Dutzik (U.S. PIRG: June 2008), 76 pp.
- Road Privatization: Explaining the Trend, Assessing the Facts and Protecting the Public, (U.S. PIRG: September 2007), 23 pp.
- Finding Solutions to Fund Transit: Combining Accountability and New Resources for World-Class Public Transportation, (U.S.PIRG: August 2007), 19 pp.
- Sunshine for California: Shining Light on Corporate Tax Secrecy for Healthier State Budgets, Investments and Markets, with Emily Rusch (CALPIRG: August 2006), 19 pp.
- Caution on New Jersey Turnpike and Parkway Deal: Six Public-Interest Principles for Considering Toll Road Monetization, with Abigail Caplowitz (New Jersey PIRG: 2006), 6 pp.
- “Local Services, Local Aid, and Common Challenges,” Rappaport Institute for Greater Boston Policy Brief (PB-2005-7), John F. Kennedy School of Government, Harvard University (November 2005).
- Technical advisor for Local Communities at Risk: Revisiting the Fiscal Partnership Between the Commonwealth Cities and Towns, Metropolitan Mayors Coalition, Municipal Finance Task Force (September 2005).
- “The Casino Gamble in Massachusetts,” with Bruce Sacerdote, Rappaport Institute for Greater Boston, John F. Kennedy School of Government, Harvard University, research report with related Policy Brief (PB-2005-1), “Betting on the Future: The Economic Impact of Legalized Gambling” (January 2005).
- “Three Worlds of Working Time: The Partisan and Welfare Politics of Work-Hours in OECD Countries” co-authored with Brian Burgoon (Politics & Societies, Dec. 2004).
- “Taxing Habits” (Cover article on alcohol and cigarette taxation) Regional Review, Federal Reserve Bank of Boston Research Department, Q1 (2003): 19–26.
- “Can CitiStat Work in Greater Boston?” Rappaport Institute for Greater Boston Working Paper, no. 7, John F. Kennedy School of Government, Harvard University (October 2003).
- “Post-Communist Unemployment Politics: Historical Legacies and the Curious Acceptance of Job Loss” in Capitalism and Democracy in Eastern and Central Europe: Assessing the Legacy of Communist Rule, Grzegorz Ekiert and Stephen Hanson, eds. (Cambridge University Press, 2003).
- “Hungary: Retrenchment amid Radical Restructuring,” in Diminishing Welfare: A Cross-National Study of Social Provision, Gertrude Schaffner Goldberg and Marguerite G. Rosenthal eds. (Greenwood Publishing Group, 2002): 271–294.
- “Explaining Differences in the Political Meaning of Unemployment,” Journal of Socio-Economics, 31,4 (2002): 469–502.
- “Good Capital, Bad Capital: Dangers and Development in Digital Diasporas,” Virtual Diasporas and Global Problem Solving Project, Nautilus Institute, San Francisco, CA, 2002
- “The New Economy Track Record” Dollars & Sense, 241 (May 2002).
- “Three Worlds of Working Time: Policy and Politics in the Work Time of Industrialized Countries” Program on Central and Eastern Europe Working Paper Series, No. 89A, Harvard University Minda De Gunzburg Center for European Studies, 2002.
- “Does the New Economy Tilt to the Right?” Dollars & Sense, 240 (March 2002). Translated into Hungarian as “Jobbra tart-e az Új Gazdaság,” appearing in the journal Esmélet (2002).
- “Spending #1, Performance #37: How the U.S. Ranks Internationally Using World Health Organization Data” Dollars & Sense, 235 (May/June 2001).
- “The European Union,” Dollars & Sense, 233 (Jan/Feb. 2001). Reprinted in Real World Globalization (Dollars & Sense, Somerville, MA: 2001).
- “Jobs versus Wages: How Strong a Trade-Off?” Dollars & Sense, 206 (Jul.-Aug. 1996). Reprinted in Real World Macro (Dollars & Sense, Somerville, MA: 2000) 12th edition. Also reprinted in Solutions to Social Problems: Lessons from Other Societies, Stanley D. Eitzen and Craig S. Leedham, eds. (Allyn & Bacon, 2001) 2nd edition.
- “When is Unemployment Politically Important Explaining Differences in Political Salience across European Countries,” West European Politics, 24, 1 (January, 2001): 75–98.
- “The Communist Taboo Against Unemployment: Ideology, Soft-Budget Constraints, or The Politics of De-Stalinization?” East European Politics and Societies, 14, 3 (Fall 2000): 597–635.
- “World Bank Chief Economist Blames Economics for Bad Advice” with Abby Scher. Dollars & Sense, 224 (July/Aug 1999): 8–9.
- “National Inequality and Hours at Work: Recent Research on a Possible Connection” Dollars & Sense (January, 1999).
- “The Communist Taboo against Unemployment: Ideology, Soft-Budget Constraints, or the Politics of De-Stalinization?” Program on Central and Eastern Europe Working Paper Series, No. 48, Harvard University Minda De Gunzburg Center for European Studies, 1999.
- “Pensions and Housing in Hungarian Welfare State Development”, Program on Central and Eastern Europe Working Paper Series, No. 34, Minda De Gunzburg Center for European Studies, Harvard University, 1994.
