= Rosalyn Baxandall =

American historian (1939–2015)

- Born: Rosalyn Fraad; June 12, 1939; New York City, U.S.
- Died: October 13, 2015 (aged 76); New York City, U.S.
- Education: University of Wisconsin–Madison
- Occupation: Historian
- Spouse: Lee Baxandall (m. 1962; div. 1978)
- Children: Phineas Baxandall
- Relatives: Harriet Fraad (sister); Ephraim London (uncle); Meyer London (great-uncle); Sheila Michaels (cousin)

Rosalyn Baxandall (née Fraad; June 12, 1939 – October 13, 2015) was an American historian of women's activism and feminist activist.

== Early life and education ==
Baxandall was born in New York City on June 12, 1939. Her father, Lewis M. Fraad, was chairman of the Department of Pediatrics at Bronx Municipal Hospital, and Assistant Dean of the Albert Einstein College of Medicine. Her mother, Irma London Fraad, was a curator of Middle Eastern Art at the Brooklyn Museum. She had two sisters, Harriet Fraad Wolff (born 1941) and Julie Fraad (born 1948).

Baxandall's maternal grandfather, Horace London, was a Russian-Jewish immigrant who arrived in the United States in 1888. Baxandall's maternal great-uncle, Meyer London, was a U.S. Congressional Representative elected on the Socialist Party ticket in 1915. He was one of 50 Congressmen and six Senators to oppose U.S. entry into World War I. Rosalyn's uncle, Ephraim London, a labor lawyer, was a distinguished civil libertarian and legal scholar.

She attended Riverdale Country Day School and then Hunter High School, graduating in 1957. After high school she attended Smith College for one year and then the University of Wisconsin–Madison, from which she graduated with a major in French in 1961. While at the university, she was active in a struggle for racial integration in housing.

== Early career and feminist activism ==
Baxandall began to work for Mobilization for Youth, a service organization on the lower east side of New York City founded by Frances Fox Piven and Richard Cloward in 1961, where she led youth groups and started a day care center. She translated French articles for the New Left journals Liberation and Viet Report.

A leader from the earliest days of the New York City women's liberation movement, Baxandall was a founding member of New York Radical Women, established in 1967, which published the well-known Notes from the First Year and Notes from the Second Year. She was also a member of Redstockings, created in 1969; WITCH (the Women's International Terrorist Conspiracy from Hell), which arose as a split-off from New York Radical Women, emphasizing political rather than personal change; No More Nice Girls; and CARASA (Coalition for Abortion Rights and Against Sterilization Abuse).

She was a member of the east-coast Marxist Feminist Group #1, an informal discussion group of scholars on socialist feminism. Shortly after her son was born, she and other parents founded Liberation Nursery, a cooperative that continues as a daycare center today. In 1968, Baxandall appeared on the nationally syndicated David Susskind show with fellow feminists Kate Millett, Anselma Del'Olio and Jacqui Ceballoss. She was also the first speaker at the historic abortion speak-out at Washington Square Methodist Church in 1969.

== Career ==
Baxandall taught Women's studies at Queens College, City University of New York. She was among the early faculty, starting in 1971, at the new campus of the State University of New York at Old Westbury (SUNY). Beginning as Associate Professor of American Studies, in 1990 she became a full professor there. In 2004 she was awarded a Distinguished Teaching Professorship. She retired in 2012. Upon her retirement, a scholarship was established in her name and that of Barbara Joseph (the Rosalyn Baxandall and Barbara Joseph Scholarship).

After retirement, she taught at the Labor Studies Program of the City University of New York (CUNY) as well as in a women's prison, Bayview Correctional Facility in Manhattan, through the Bard Prison Initiative.

She was a frequent speaker and commentator on women's liberation, women's activist history, and radical activist movements. Especially in her later years, she was a champion for the rights of Palestinians, a commitment that led her to edit an anthology of films about the Palestine-Israel conflict.

== Publications ==
Her books include:

- Rosalyn Baxandall; Linda Gordon, eds. (2001). Dear Sisters: Dispatches from the Women's Liberation Movement. Basic Books. ISBN 978-0-465-01707-2. "Linda Gordon."
- Rosalyn Baxandall; Elizabeth Ewen (2000). Picture Windows, How the Suburbs Happened, 1945–1987. Basic Books. ISBN 978-0-465-07013-8.
- Rosalyn Fraad Baxandall; Linda Gordon; Susan Reverby, eds. (1976). America's Working Women. W. W. Norton & Company. ISBN 978-0-393-31262-1. (revised ed. 1995)
- Rosalyn Fraad Baxandall; Elizabeth Gurley Flynn (1987). Words On Fire: The Life and Writing of Elizabeth Gurley Flynn (Douglass Series on Woman's Lives and the Meaning of Gender). Rutgers University Press. ISBN 978-0-8135-1241-9.

Baxandall wrote many articles for magazines and journals, including Second-Wave Soundings with co-author Linda Gordon in The Nation and Re-Visioning the Women's Liberation Movement's Narrative: Early Second Wave African American Feminists in Feminist Studies, as well as authoring the pamphlet, Women and Abortion: The Body as Battleground.

Her work is also in several anthologies, including A Companion to American Women's History; Red Diapers: Growing Up in the Communist Left; Technology, the Labor Process and the Working Class: Essays; and the Encyclopedia of the American Left. She wrote an introduction to a new collection of works by Clara Zetkin, Clara Zetkin: Selected Writings.

Baxandall was interviewed in the 2005 film by Gillian Aldrich and Jennifer Baumgardner, I Had An Abortion.

Some of her papers on the women's liberation movement are available in the Duke University Library Special Collections; Papers from her work with Linda Gordon are housed in the Tamiment Library and the Robert F. Wagner Labor Archives at New York University. An extensive collection of her papers, interviews, and letters are in a collection at Radcliffe Library at Harvard University.

== Personal life ==
At the University of Wisconsin, she met Lee Baxandall, to whom she was married from 1962 until they divorced in 1978. Together, they had one son, Phineas Baxandall.

After leaving Madison, Rosalyn and Lee Baxandall spent some time in Germany, Hungary and Poland, where Lee pursued his interests in radical theater and European Marxism. The experience solidified their convictions that the Soviet system did not offer an alternative. Moving back to New York, she enrolled in the Columbia University School of Social Work from which she received a Master of Social Work (MSW).

Rosalyn Baxandall's maternal cousin was Sheila Michaels, also a remarkable feminist in her own right, whom Ephraim London never publicly acknowledged as his daughter.

== Death ==
After a 2015 diagnosis of kidney cancer, she left the hospital and held a party to say goodbye to the hundred attendees. She died on October 13, 2015, at her home in New York City.
