= National Advisory Council on Violence Against Women =

Women's rights organization based in the United States

The National Advisory Council on Violence Against Women was created in 1995 by the United States Department of Health and Human Services and the United States Department of Justice. It consists of experts from law enforcement, media, business, sports, health and social services, and victim advocacy. The council works with both the public and private sectors to promote greater awareness about the problem of violence against women and its victims, to help devise solutions, and to advise the federal government on these issues. The NACVAW does not advise on issues of violence against men, as it is a gender specific advocacy for women alone.

The NACVAW created the promotional "Toolkit To End Violence Against Women" to provide concrete guidance to communities, policy leaders, and individuals engaged in activities to end violence against women. As described, "each Toolkit chapter focuses on a particular audience or environment and includes recommendations for strengthening prevention efforts and improving services and advocacy for victims."
