= Lee Baxandall =

American activist and writer (1935–2008)

- Born: Lee Raymond Baxandall; January 26, 1935; Oshkosh, Wisconsin, U.S.
- Died: November 28, 2008 (aged 73); Oshkosh, Wisconsin, U.S.
- Occupations: Writer; activist
- Spouses: Rosalyn Fraad (m. 1962, divorced) Johanna Moore (m. 1992)
- Children: Phineas Baxandall

Lee Raymond Baxandall (January 26, 1935 – November 28, 2008) was an American writer, translator, editor, and activist. He was first known for his New Left engagement with cultural topics and then as a leader of the naturist movement.

== Early life ==
Lee R. Baxandall was born on January 26, 1935, in Oshkosh, Wisconsin, to Neita Evelyn (née Lee) and Raymond W. Baxandall. He attended Oshkosh High School. He attended the University of Wisconsin in Madison, where he obtained a Bachelor of Arts in 1957 and a Master of Arts in 1958 in English, studied comparative literature at the doctoral level, and became one of the editors of Studies on the Left, a New Left intellectual journal known for its free-wheeling qualities. In 1960, Baxandall traveled to revolutionary Cuba.

== Theatre work ==
Throughout the 1960s and 1970s, Baxandall demonstrated a strong interest in the relationship between culture, particularly theatre, and radicalism. He translated plays by Peter Weiss and Bertolt Brecht, edited a collection of writings by the German social critic and psychologist Wilhelm Reich, compiled an annotated bibliography on Marxism and aesthetics, and wrote numerous essays on major literary figures, including Bertolt Brecht and Franz Kafka. In 1965 he gave lectures at the Free University of New York on 'Marxist approaches to the Avant-Garde Arts. Baxandall also wrote plays. His Hiroshima Requiem about the U.S. atomic bombing of Hiroshima, Japan was put to music by Leonard Lehrman and performed in 1990. His play Potsy, which was chiefly a monolog in an outhouse, was also performed, as was his play Claws of the Eagle − Claws of the Jaguar, which he wrote in 1967.

== Leftist writing ==
In 1973, he edited a collection of writings by Karl Marx and Friedrich Engels on art and literature with Polish philosopher Stefan Morawski. Baxandall's writing appeared in a wide variety of venues, from left-wing periodicals such as The Nation, New Politics, The National Guardian, and Liberation, to mainstream publications including The New York Times and intellectual-cultural outlets such as Partisan Review, The Journal of Aesthetics and Art Criticism, and New German Critique.

== Naturism ==
After the death of his father in 1970, Baxandall increasingly shifted his time back to Oshkosh. He took over his father's education publishing business, The Baxandall Company. By the late 1970s, naturism become the main focus of Baxandall's activism. He first took up the activity as an Eagle Scout in Wisconsin and frequented a free beach with his family at Cape Cod National Seashore in the 1960s and 1970s. In 1974, he travelled to the West Coast of the United States to meet founders of the free beach movement there: Eugene Callen and Cec Cinder. This became Beachfront USA. Having inherited his family's publishing business in Oshkosh in 1970, which he managed by traveling back there monthly and then by relocating to there permanently in 1978, Baxandall began to publish Free Beaches magazine and created the Free Beaches Documentation Center, collecting data from all over the world on nude beaches. In 1980, he published Lee Baxandall's World Guide to Nude Beaches & Recreation, a color guidebook locating places to go nude all over the world, which he succeeded in getting distributed through major book channels. It was updated and published again several times, the last being in 1996.

Baxandall's view was that nudism fostered body acceptance and broke down the alienation and repression that stood in the way of the realization of full human potential. He founded The Naturist Society in 1980 and was the first editor of its magazine, Clothed with the Sun, launched in 1981 and renamed Nude & Natural in 1989. The Naturist Society had very inclusive membership policies, in contrast to the more conservative America Sunbathing Association, now known as the American Association for Nude Recreation. Baxandall is a member of their Nudist Hall Of Fame.

Baxandall was one of the originators, along with Eugene Callen, of "National Nude Weekend," later "National Nude Week", which he used to generate media attention for the cause. He helped organize and sponsor the first nationwide and later regional annual Naturist Gatherings, with seminars and nude fun for everyone. He also commissioned Edin and Ethel Vélez to produce a series of videos (World of Skinnydipping, etc.) depicting the naturist lifestyle and debunking myths surrounding nude recreation.

Baxandall founded the Naturist Action Committee, the primary group responsible for early warning and defense against those who would legislate naturists out of existence in the United States. He was the first to retain the services of a professional lobbyist to get the movement's viewpoint heard in state legislatures and Congress. He founded the Naturist Education Foundation, devoted to improving awareness and acceptance of naturism and body acceptance throughout North America.

== Personal life ==
In 1962, he married Rosalyn Fraad. She became an early women's liberation activist and they had a son, Phineas. Living in New York City from 1962 to 1977, they were active in the movement to end the Vietnam War. They later divorced.

Lee's first brief marriage was to Judith Woelffer, with whom he had a child Pamela in 1958. In 1992, Baxandall remarried, to longtime companion Johanna Moore.

== Later life and commemoration ==
In 1995, Baxandall was diagnosed with Parkinson's disease and he retired from public life in 2002. He died on November 28, 2008, in Oshkosh.

Baxandall is commemorated by the naming of a bridge in his honour at the Desert Shadows Inn Resort and Villas, Palm Springs, California.

== Quotes ==
- When the culture into which we are born strays too far from nature’s laws, we suffer; a ‘naturalization’ is in order.
- Body Acceptance is the idea, Nude Recreation is the way. Popular motto of The Naturist Society
- Every civilized nation has nude beaches. That's a mark of a civilized nation. from video: The Beginner's Guide to Skinny Dipping. The Naturist Society. Fast Forward Images, Inc. 1991.

== Publications ==
- "Marxism and Aesthetics: A Selective Annotated Bibliography; Books and Articles in the English Language", Humanities Press, 1968 reissued in 1978
- Marx & Engels on literature & art: a selection of writings. Telos Press. 1973. ISBN 978-0-914386-02-5.
- "Radical Perspectives in the Arts". Telos. 1973 (18): 189–192. 1973. doi:10.3817/1273018189. ISSN 0090-6514. S2CID 146943945.
- World Guide to Nude Beaches and Recreation. Stonehill Publishing Company. 1980. ISBN 978-0-88373-107-9. reissued in 1981, 1995 and 1997
- "The Sociology of Modern Drama". The Tulane Drama Review. 9 (4). The MIT Press: 146–170. Summer 1965. doi:10.2307/1125039. JSTOR 1125039.
- "The Theatre of Edward Albee". The Tulane Drama Review. 9 (4). The MIT Press: 19–40. Summer 1965. doi:10.2307/1125030. JSTOR 1125030.
- "Brecht in America, 1935". TDR. 12 (1). The MIT Press: 69–87. Autumn 1967. doi:10.2307/1125294. JSTOR 1125294.
- Claws of the Eagle, Claws of the Jaguar: A Ritual Drama. Department of Comparative American Cultures, Washington State University. 2001.
