= History of left-wing politics in the United States =

The history of left-wing politics in the United States consists of a broad range of individuals and groups that have sought fundamental egalitarian changes. Left-wing activists in the United States have been credited with advancing social change on issues such as labor and civil rights as well as providing critiques of capitalism.

Many communes and egalitarian communities have existed in the United States as a sub-category of the broader intentional community movement, some of which were based on utopian socialist ideals. Left-wing politics in the United States dates back to the French Revolution which gave rise to the terms Left and Right and which influenced American politics, with the Democratic-Republican Party representing the Left as opposed to the Federalist Party representing the Right.

Explanations for weakness of left-wing politics in the United States include the failures of socialist organization and leadership, the limitations imposed by the United States Constitution, American political system's persistent hostility toward third parties and political repression.

Eugene V. Debs 1920, 914,191 votes, remains the all-time high number of votes for a Socialist Party candidate in a U.S. presidential election as of 2024.

Debs 1912, 6.0% of the popular vote, remains the all-time highest percentage of the vote for a Socialist Party candidate in a U.S. presidential election as of 2024.

== Colonial era ==
Many indigenous tribes in North America practiced what Marxists would later call primitive communism, meaning they practiced economic cooperation among the members of their tribes.

=== Utopian communities ===
The first European socialists to arrive in North America were a Christian sect known as Labadists, who founded the commune of Bohemia Manor in 1683, about 60 miles west of Philadelphia, Pennsylvania. Their communal way of life was based on the communal practices of the apostles and early Christians. The Shakers, an offshoot of the Quakers, also began to settle utopian socialist communities in the late 18th century, some of which lasted into the 20th century.

=== Democratic reform ===
While there was little organized labor action in colonial America, it was frequently tied to the right to vote and the broader rights of working people. The first strike in America was a group of Polish workers who demanded the right to vote in the Jamestown colony.

In 1676, an interracial group of angry Virginians came together in Bacon's Rebellion, listing complaints ranging including unjust taxation, judicial corruption, and installing a person in a position of power against the people's consent. While the rebellion ultimately failed, it was one of the first populist movements in the Thirteen Colonies, and was the largest uprising against British colonial rule prior to the American Revolution.

In the 1760s, a group of predominately lower-class North Carolina citizens began to organize against what they saw as a corrupt and unequal colonial government. While the demonstrations started out peaceful, they escalated into what would become known as the War of the Regulation. In 1768, the Regulators entered Hillsborough, broke up the provincial court, and dragged those they saw as corrupt officials through the streets. After a loss at the Battle of Alamance, the Regulator movement was essentially defeated, and their demands were never met. However, this served as one of the catalysts to the American Revolution.

=== Early abolitionism ===
As slavery began to develop in the 17th century, many figures began to oppose it. Roger Williams, the founder of the Colony of Rhode Island, led an unsuccessful attempt to ban slavery in the colonies. Samuel Sewall, a puritan judge who felt remorse over his part in the Salem Witch Trials, became an abolitionist later in life, writing The Selling of Joseph, which argued against slavery and racial inferiority using scriptural arguments.

Many of the most prominent early abolitionists were Quakers, though a small number of them did own slaves. The first two prominent Friends to denounce slavery were Anthony Benezet and John Woolman. They asked the Quakers, "What thing in the world can be done worse towards us, than if men should rob or steal us away and sell us for slaves to strange countries". In that same year, a group of Quakers along with some German Mennonites met at the meeting house in Germantown, Pennsylvania, to discuss why they were distancing themselves from slavery. This call for abolition was frequently combined with a larger critique of greed and wealth, as in John Woolman's A Plea for the Poor:

Wealth desired for its own sake obstructs the increase of virtue, and large possessions in the hands of selfish men have a bad tendency, for by their means too small a number of people are employed in things useful; and therefore they, or some of them, are necessitated to labour too hard, while others would want business to earn their bread were not employments invented which, having no real use, serve only to please the vain mind.

Slaves themselves also resisted the rise of chattel slavery. In the 17th century, new slaves would petition courts for their freedom, arguing that a conversion to Christianity should give them the right to escape slavery. Many slaves, inspired by the First Great Awakening, had a deeply religious view of the struggle against slavery, comparing themselves to the ancient Israelites in Egypt. There were a number of slave revolts: in Virginia in 1663, in New York in 1712 and 1741, and in South Carolina in 1736. The revolts themselves frequently included Native Americans and poor whites.

== 19th and 20th century ==
=== Marxist development ===
The first secular American socialists were German Marxist immigrants who arrived following the Revolutions of 1848, also known as Forty-Eighters. Joseph Weydemeyer, a German colleague of Karl Marx who sought refuge in New York in 1851, following the 1848 revolutions, established the first Marxist journal in the U.S., called Die Revolution. It folded after two issues. in 1852 he established the Proletarierbund, which would become the American Workers League, the first Marxist organization in the U.S. But it too was short-lived, having failed to attract a native English-speaking membership.

In 1866, William H. Sylvis formed the National Labor Union (NLU). Friedrich Sorge, a German who had found refuge in New York following the 1848 revolutions, took Local No. 5 of the NLU into the First International as Section One in the U.S. By 1872, there were 22 sections, which were able to hold a convention in New York. The General Council of the International moved to New York with Sorge as General Secretary, but following internal conflict, it dissolved in 1876.

A larger wave of German immigrants followed in the 1870s and 1880s, which included social democratic followers of Ferdinand Lasalle. Lasalle believed that state aid through political action was the road to revolution and was opposed to trade unionism which he saw as futile, believing that according to the Iron Law of Wages employers would only pay subsistence wages. The Lasalleans formed the Social Democratic Party of North America in 1874 and both Marxists and Lasalleans formed the Workingmen's Party of the United States in 1876. When the Lasalleans gained control in 1877, they changed the name to the Socialist Labor Party of North America (SLP). However many socialists abandoned political action altogether and moved to trade unionism. Two former socialists, Adolph Strasser and Samuel Gompers, formed the American Federation of Labor (AFL) in 1886.

Anarchists split from the Socialist Labor Party to form the Revolutionary Socialist Labor Party in 1881. By 1885 they had 7,000 members, double the membership of the SLP. They were inspired by the International Anarchist Congress of 1881 in London. There were two federations in the United States that pledged adherence to the International. A convention of immigrant anarchists in Chicago formed the International Working People's Association (Black International), while a group of Native Americans in San Francisco formed the International Workingmen's Association (Red International). Following a violent demonstration at Haymarket in Chicago in 1886, public opinion turned against anarchism. While very little violence could be attributed to anarchists, the attempted murder of a financier by an anarchist in 1892 and the 1901 assassination of the American president, William McKinley, by a professed anarchist led to the ending of political asylum for anarchists in 1903. In 1919, following the Palmer raids, anarchists were imprisoned and many, including Emma Goldman and Alexander Berkman, were deported. Yet anarchism again reached great public notice with the trial of the anarchists Sacco and Vanzetti, who would be executed in 1927.

Daniel De Leon, who became leader of the SLP in 1890, took it in a Marxist direction. Eugene Debs, who had been an organizer for the American Railway Union formed the rival Social Democratic Party in 1898. Members of the SLP, led by Morris Hillquit and opposed to the De Leon's domineering personal rule and his anti-AFL trade union policy joined with the Social Democrats to form the Socialist Party of America (SPA).

In 1905 a convention of socialists, anarchists and trade unionists disenchanted with the bureaucracy and craft unionism of the American Federation of Labor, founded the rival Industrial Workers of the World (IWW), led by such figures as William D. "Big Bill" Haywood, Helen Keller, De Leon and Debs.

The organizers of the IWW disagreed on whether electoral politics could be employed to liberate the working class. Debs left the IWW in 1906, and De Leon was expelled in 1908, forming a rival "Chicago IWW" that was closely linked to the SLP. The (Minneapolis) IWW's ideology evolved into anarcho-syndicalism, or "revolutionary industrial unionism", and avoided electoral political activity altogether. It was successful in organizing unskilled migratory workers in the lumber, agriculture, and construction trades in the Western states and immigrant textile workers in the Eastern states and occasionally accepted violence as part of industrial action.

The SPA was divided between reformers who believed that socialism could be achieved through gradual reform of capitalism and revolutionaries who thought that socialism could only develop after capitalism was overthrown, but the party steered a center path between the two. The SPA achieved the peak of its success by 1912 when its presidential candidate received 5.9% of the popular vote. The first Socialist congressman, Victor Berger, had been elected in 1910. By the beginning of 1912, there were 1,039 Socialist officeholders, including 56 mayors, 305 aldermen and councilmen, 22 police officials, and some state legislators. Milwaukee, Berkeley, Butte, Schenectady, and Flint were run by Socialists. A Socialist challenger to Gompers took one third of the vote in a challenge for leadership of the AFL. The SPA had 5 English and 8 foreign-language daily newspapers, 262 English and 36 foreign-language weeklies, and 10 English and 2 foreign-language monthlies.

American entry into the First World War in 1917 led to a patriotic hysteria aimed against Germans, immigrants, African Americans, class-conscious workers, and Socialists, and the ensuing Espionage Act and Sedition Act were used against them. The government harassed Socialist newspapers, the post office denied the SP use of the mails, and antiwar militants were arrested. Soon Debs and more than sixty IWW leaders were charged under the acts.

=== Communist–Socialist split, the New Deal and Red Scares ===
In 1919, John Reed, Benjamin Gitlow and other Socialists formed the Communist Labor Party of America, while Socialist foreign sections led by Charles Ruthenberg formed the Communist Party. These two groups would be combined as the Communist Party of the United States of America (CPUSA). The Communists organized the Trade Union Unity League to compete with the AFL and claimed to represent 50,000 workers.

In 1928, following divisions inside the Soviet Union, Jay Lovestone, who had replaced Ruthenberg as general secretary of the CPUSA following his death, joined with William Z. Foster to expel Foster's former allies, James P. Cannon and Max Shachtman, who were followers of Leon Trotsky. Following another Soviet factional dispute, Lovestone and Gitlow were expelled, and Earl Browder became party leader.

Cannon, Shachtman, and Martin Abern then set up the Trotskyist Communist League of America, and recruited members from the CPUSA. The League then merged with A. J. Muste's American Workers Party in 1934, forming the Workers Party. New members included James Burnham and Sidney Hook.

By the 1930s the Socialist Party was deeply divided between an Old Guard, led by Hillquit, and younger Militants, who were more sympathetic to the Soviet Union, led by Norman Thomas. The Old Guard left the party to form the Social Democratic Federation. Following talks between the Workers Party and the Socialists, members of the Workers Party joined the Socialists in 1936. Once inside they operated as a separate faction. The Trotskyists were expelled from the Socialist Party the following year, and set up the Socialist Workers Party (SWP) and the youth wing of the Socialists, the Young People's Socialist League (YPSL) joined them. Shachtman and others were expelled from the SWP in 1940 over their position on the Soviet Union and set up the Workers Party. Within months many members of the new party, including Burnham, had left. The Workers Party was renamed the Independent Socialist League (ISL) in 1949 and ceased being a political party.

Some members of the Old Guard formed the American Labor Party (ALP) in New York State, with support from the Congress of Industrial Organizations (CIO). The right-wing of this party broke away in 1944 to form the Liberal Party of New York. In the 1936, 1940 and 1944 elections the ALP received 274,000, 417,000, and 496,000 votes in New York State, while the Liberals received 329,000 votes in 1944.

The United States Progressive Party of 1948 was a left-wing political party that served as a vehicle for former Vice President Henry A. Wallace's 1948 presidential campaign. The party sought desegregation, the establishment of a national health insurance system, an expansion of the welfare system, and the nationalization of the energy industry. The party also sought conciliation with the Soviet Union during the early stages of the Cold War.

=== Civil rights, War on Poverty and the New Left ===
In 1958 the Socialist Party welcomed former members of the Independent Socialist League, which before its 1956 dissolution had been led by Max Shachtman. Shachtman had developed a Marxist critique of Soviet communism as "bureaucratic collectivism", a new form of class society that was more oppressive than any form of capitalism. Shachtman's theory was similar to that of many dissidents and refugees from Communism, such as the theory of the "New Class" proposed by Yugoslavian dissident Milovan Đilas (Djilas). Shachtman's ISL had attracted youth like Irving Howe, Michael Harrington, Tom Kahn, and Rachelle Horowitz. The YPSL was dissolved, but the party formed a new youth group under the same name.

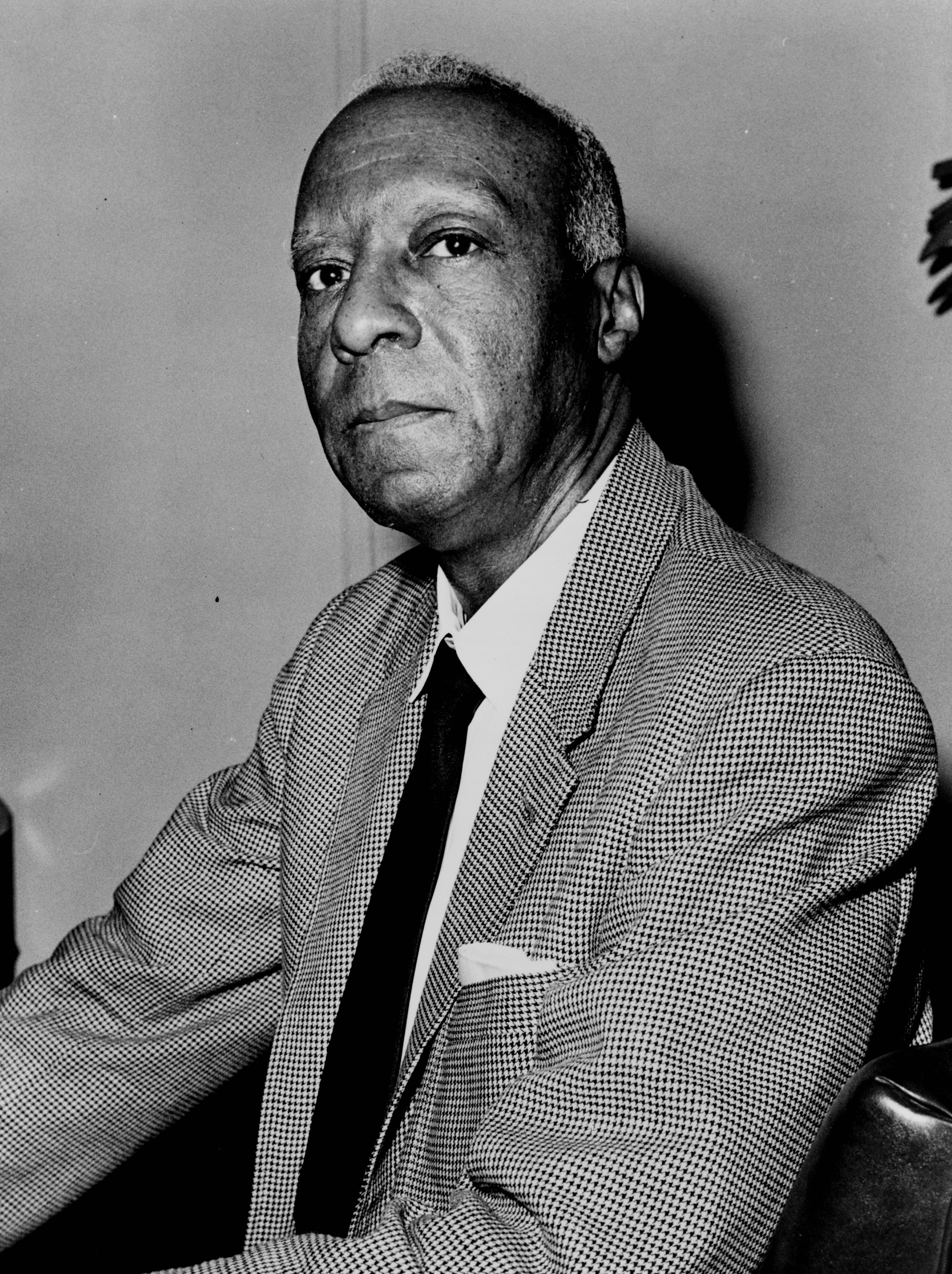
Socialist A. Philip Randolph co-led the 1963 March on Washington for Jobs and Freedom at which Martin Luther King Jr. delivered his "I Have a Dream" speech

Kahn and Horowitz, along with Norman Hill, helped Bayard Rustin with the civil rights movement. Rustin had helped to spread pacificism and nonviolence to leaders of the movement, like Martin Luther King Jr.. Rustin's circle and A. Philip Randolph organized the 1963 March on Washington for Jobs and Freedom, where King delivered his "I Have A Dream" speech.

Michael Harrington soon became the most visible socialist in the United States when his The Other America became a best seller, following a long and laudatory New Yorker review by Dwight Macdonald. Harrington and other socialists were called to Washington, D.C., to assist the Kennedy Administration and then the Johnson Administration's War on Poverty and Great Society.

Shachtman, Michael Harrington, Kahn, and Rustin argued advocated a political strategy called "realignment," that prioritized strengthening labor unions and other progressive organizations that were already active in the Democratic Party. Contributing to the day-to-day actions of the civil rights movement and labor unions had gained socialists credibility and influence, and had helped to push politicians in the Democratic Party towards "social-liberal" or social-democratic positions, at least on civil rights and the War on Poverty.

Harrington, Kahn, and Horowitz were officers and staff-persons of the League for Industrial Democracy (LID), which helped to start the New Left Students for a Democratic Society (SDS). The three LID officers clashed with the less experienced activists of SDS, like Tom Hayden, when the latter's Port Huron Statement criticized socialist and liberal opposition to communism and criticized the labor movement while promoting students as agents of social change.LID and SDS split in 1965, when SDS voted to remove from its constitution the "exclusion clause" that prohibited membership by communists: The SDS exclusion clause had barred "advocates of or apologists for" "totalitarianism". The clause's removal effectively invited "disciplined cadre" to attempt to "take over or paralyze" SDS, as had occurred to mass organizations in the thirties. Afterwards, Marxism–Leninism, particularly the Progressive Labor Party, helped to write "the death sentence" for SDS, which nonetheless had over 100 thousand members at its peak.

In 1972, the Socialist Party voted to rename itself as Social Democrats, USA (SDUSA) by a vote of 73 to 34 at its December Convention; its National Chairmen were Bayard Rustin, a peace and civil-rights leader, and Charles S. Zimmerman, an officer of the International Ladies Garment Workers Union (ILGWU). In 1973, Michael Harrington resigned from SDUSA and founded the Democratic Socialist Organizing Committee (DSOC), which attracted many of his followers from the former Socialist Party. The same year, David McReynolds and others from the pacifist and immediate-withdrawal wing of the former Socialist Party formed the Socialist Party, USA.

When the SPA became SDUSA, the majority had 22 of 33 votes on the (January 1973) national committee of SDUSA. Two minority caucuses of SDUSA became associated with two other socialist organizations, each of which was founded later in 1973. Many members of Michael Harrington's ("Coalition") caucus, with 8 of 33 seats on the 1973 SDUSA national committee, joined Harrington's DSOC. Many members of the Debs caucus, with 2 of 33 seats on SDUSA's 1973 national committee, joined the Socialist Party of the United States (SPUSA).

From 1979–1989, SDUSA members like Tom Kahn organized the AFL–CIO's fundraising of 300 thousand dollars, which bought printing presses and other supplies requested by Solidarnosc (Solidarity), the independent labor-union of Poland. SDUSA members helped form a bipartisan coalition (of the Democratic and Republican parties) to support the founding of the National Endowment for Democracy (NED), whose first President was Carl Gershman. The NED publicly allocated US$4 million of public aid to Solidarity through 1989.

=== Decentralization and direct action tactics ===
In the 1990s, anarchists attempted to organize across North America around Love and Rage, which drew several hundred activists. By 1997 anarchist organizations began to proliferate. One successful anarchist movement was Food not Bombs, that distributed free vegetarian meals. Anarchists received significant media coverage for their disruption of the 1999 World Trade Organization conference, called the Battle in Seattle, where the Direct Action Network was organized. Most organizations were short-lived and anarchism went into decline following a reaction by the authorities that was increased after the September 11 attacks in 2001.

== 21st century ==
=== Bernie Sanders campaigns, Black Lives Matter and Occupy ===
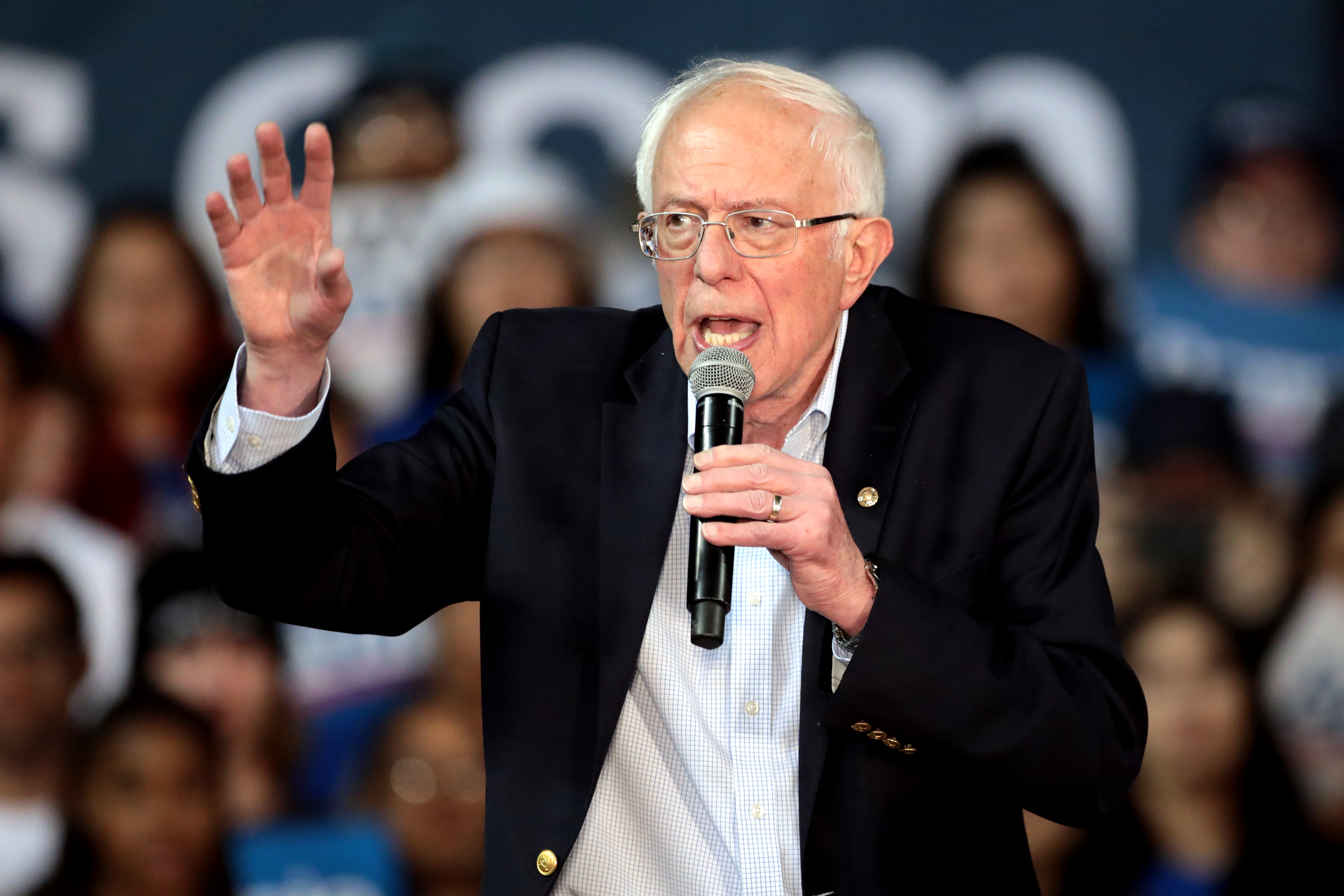
Bernie Sanders, senior United States senator from Vermont and two-time presidential candidate in 2016 and 2020

Bernie Sanders, a self-described democratic socialist who runs as an independent, won his first election as mayor of Burlington, Vermont in 1981 and was re-elected for three additional terms. He then represented Vermont in the U.S. House of Representatives from 1991 until 2007, and was subsequently elected U.S. Senator for Vermont in 2007, a position which he still holds.

In the 2000 presidential election, Ralph Nader and Winona LaDuke received 2,882,000 votes or 2.74% of the popular vote on the Green Party ticket.

Filmmaker Michael Moore directed a series of popular movies examining the United States and its government policy from a left perspective, including Roger & Me, Bowling for Columbine, Sicko, Capitalism: A Love Story and Fahrenheit 9/11, which was the top grossing documentary film of all time.

In 2011, Occupy Wall Street protests demanding accountability for the 2008 financial crisis and against inequality started in Manhattan, New York and soon spread to other cities around the country, becoming known more broadly as the Occupy Movement.

On November 5, 2013, Kshama Sawant, Socialist Alternative candidate, was elected to Position 2 of the Seattle City Council. Sawant's victory made her the first socialist to win a citywide election in Seattle since Anna Louise Strong was elected to the School Board in 1916 and the first socialist on the City Council since A. W. Piper, elected in 1877. She was sworn into office on January 6, 2014.

The nascent Black Lives Matter movement gained momentum on social media in July 2013, in response to the acquittal of the shooter in the February 2012 killing of Trayvon Martin. It rapidly expanded in response to subsequent shooting incidents such as the August 2014 shooting of Michael Brown. In response to that shooting, there were nationwide protests, most notably in Ferguson, Missouri.

On November 3, 2015, Kshama Sawant, Socialist Alternative candidate, was elected to Position 3 of the Seattle City Council.

In the 2016 presidential election, independent Vermont Senator Bernie Sanders ran a strong primary campaign, but he did not win the nomination though he nearly won many midwestern states including an upset in Michigan. The Sanders movement led to the creation of progressive groups such as Brand New Congress, Indivisible, Justice Democrats and Our Revolution.

Sanders ran for president again in the 2020 Democratic Party presidential primaries, and unlike in 2016 was seen as the frontrunner at one point, but when the field coalesced against him on Super Tuesday he lost to former Vice President Joe Biden with weakened support than before. However after the latter was elected, the Biden presidency took progressive ques such as the American Rescue Plan.

In June 2025, the New York City chapter-endorsed candidate, Zohran Mamdani, won the Democratic Party primary election for mayor, defeating former governor Andrew Cuomo. In November, he won the 2025 New York City mayoral election and became the second DSA mayor of New York City after David Dinkins left office in 1993.

== See also ==
- American Left
- History of the socialist movement in the United States
- Share Our Wealth Plan
- Huey Long, a governor and later United States Senator from Louisiana
