= Leading members of Social Democrats, USA =

Small organizations associated with the Socialist Party of America have served as schools for the leadership of social-movement organizations, including the civil rights movement and the sixties radicalism. These organizations are now chiefly remembered because of their members' leadership of large organizations that directly influenced the United States and international politics. After 1960, the party also functioned as an educational organization and a caucus of policy advocates on the left wing of the Democratic Party.

Similarly, Social Democrats, USA (one of three successor organizations to the Socialist Party) was known mainly because of the activities of its members, many of whom publicly identified themselves as members of SDUSA. Members of SDUSA have served as officers for governmental, private and not-for-profit organizations. A. Philip Randolph, Bayard Rustin and Norman Hill were leaders of the civil rights movement. Tom Kahn, Sandra Feldman and Rachelle Horowitz were officers of labor unions. Carl Gershman and Penn Kemble served in governmental and non-governmental organizations, particularly in foreign policy. Philosopher Sidney Hook was a public intellectual. Writing after the death of Tom Kahn, Ben Wattenberg commented that SDUSA as an "umbrella organization" associated with other letterhead organizations, saying the following:

[SDUSA members seemed to be] ingeniously trying to bury the Soviet Union in a blizzard of letterheads. It seemed that each of Tom's colleagues—Penn Kemble, Carl Gershman, Josh Muravchik and many more—ran a little organization, each with the same interlocking directorate listed on the stationery. Funny thing: The Letterhead Lieutenants did indeed churn up a blizzard, and the Soviet Union is no more.

...

They talked and wrote endlessly, mostly about communism and democracy, despising the former, adoring the latter. It is easy today to say "anti-communist" and "pro-democracy" in the same breath. But that is because American foreign policy eventually became just such a mixture, thanks in part to the Young People's Socialist League, with Tom Kahn as provocateur-at-large.

== A. Philip Randolph ==
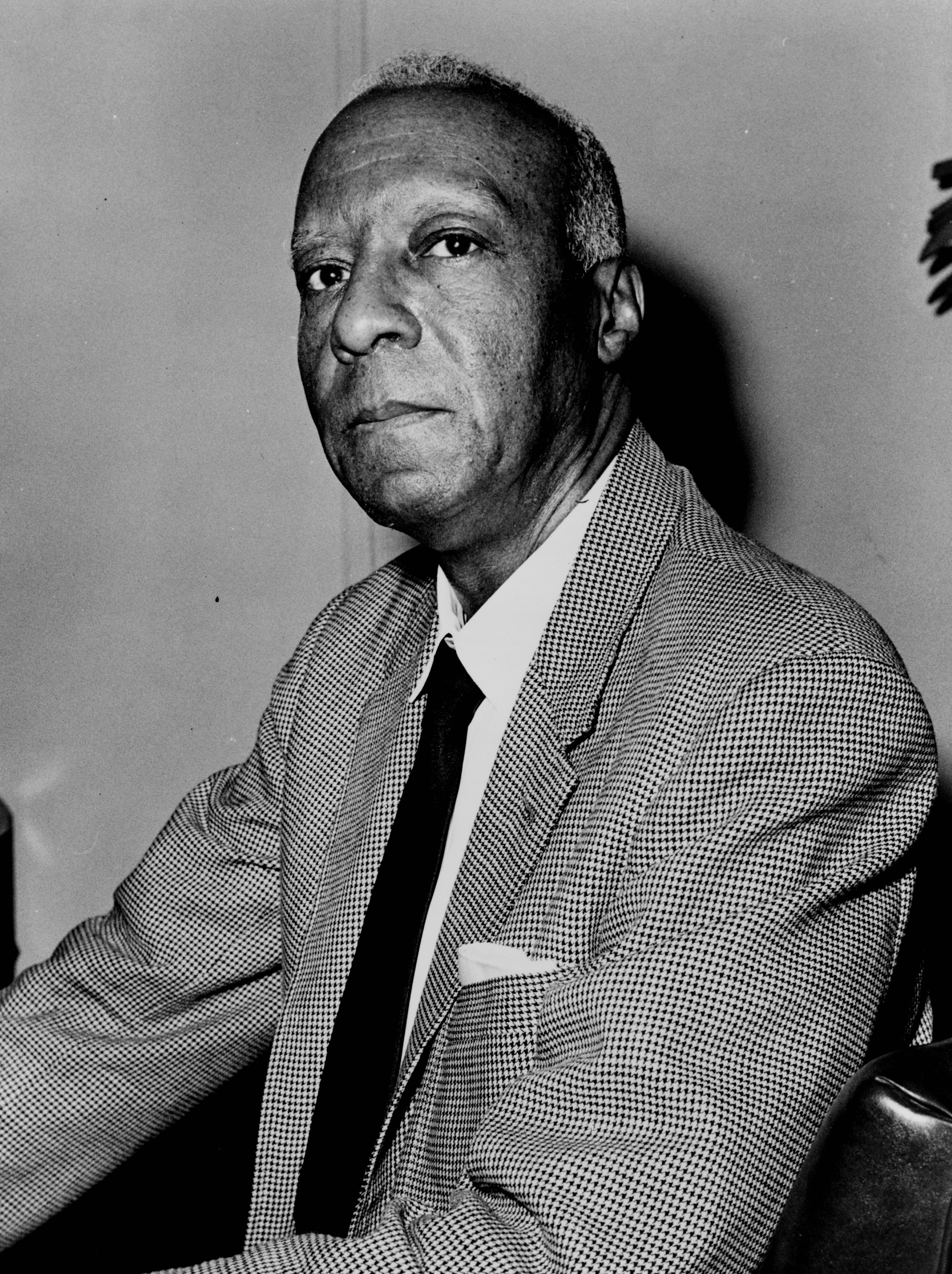
A. Philip Randolph was a visible member of Norman Thomas' Socialist Party of America and then of SDUSA.

The long-time leader and intellectual architect of the civil rights movement, A. Philip Randolph was also a visible member of the Socialist Party of Norman Thomas and remained with the faction that renamed itself as the SDUSA. Along with ILGWU President David Dubinsky, Randolph was honored at the 1976 SDUSA convention.

A. Philip Randolph came to national attention as the leader of the Brotherhood of Sleeping Car Porters. Randolph proposed a march on Washington, D.C. to protest racial discrimination in the United States armed forces. Meeting with President Franklin D. Roosevelt in the Oval Office, Randolph respectfully, politely, but firmly told President Roosevelt that blacks would march in the capital unless desegregation would occur. The planned march was canceled after President Roosevelt issued Executive Order 8802 (the Fair Employment Act), which banned discrimination in defense industries and federal agencies.

In 1942, an estimated 18,000 blacks gathered at Madison Square Garden to hear Randolph kick off a campaign against discrimination in the military, in war industries, in government agencies and in labor unions. Following the act, during the Philadelphia Transit Strike of 1944 the government backed African American workers' striking to gain positions formerly limited to white employees.

In 1947, Randolph, along with colleague Grant Reynolds, renewed efforts to end discrimination in the armed services, forming the Committee Against Jim Crow in Military Service, later renamed the League for Non-Violent Civil Disobedience. On July 26, 1948, President Harry S. Truman abolished racial segregation in the armed forces through Executive Order 9981. Randolph was the nominal leader of the March on Washington for Jobs and Freedom, which was organized by Bayard Rustin and his younger associates. At this march, Martin Luther King Jr. delivered his well-known "I Have a Dream" speech. Soon afterwards, the Civil Rights Act of 1964 was passed by the 88th Congress and signed into law by President Johnson.

== Bayard Rustin ==
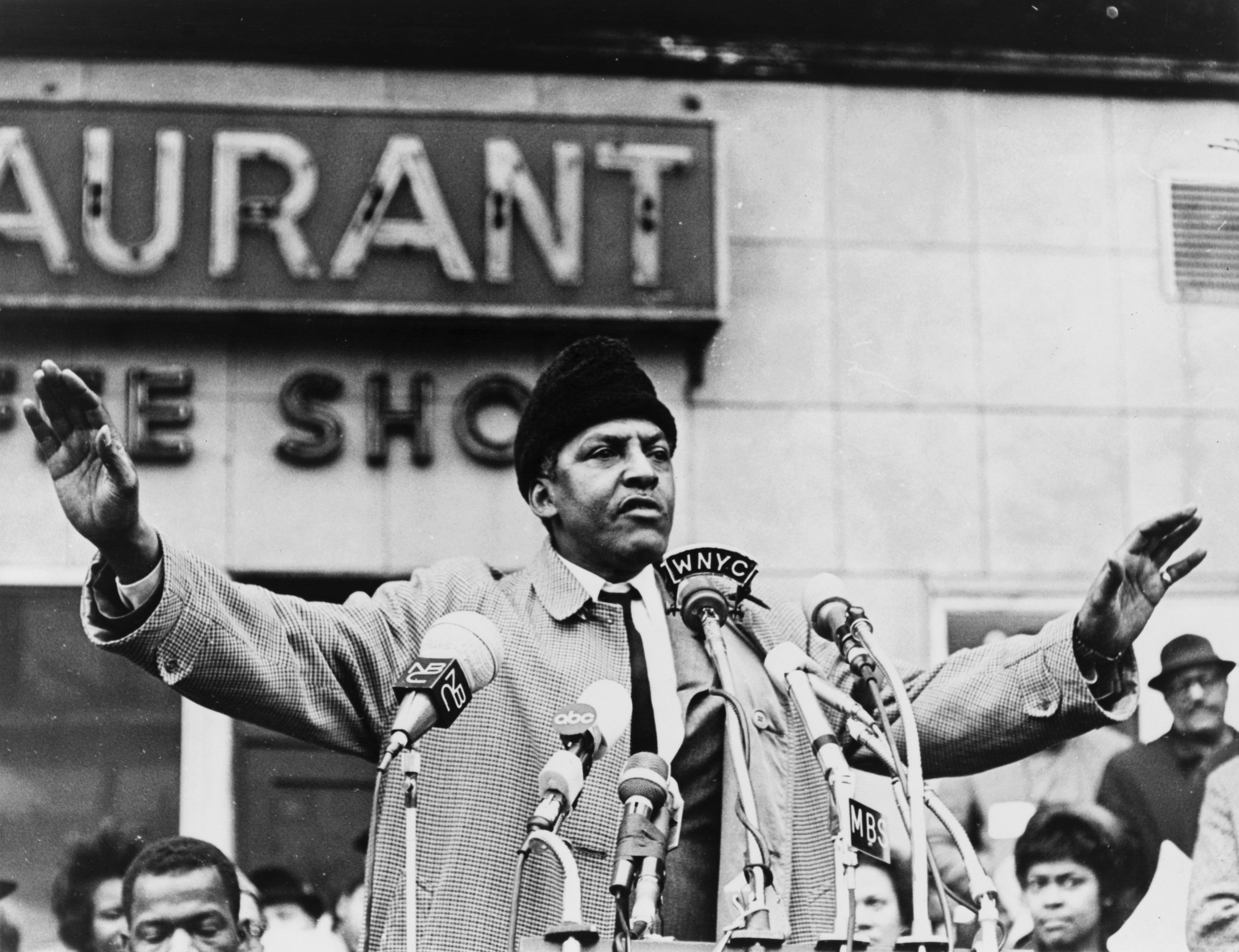
Rustin in 1965

Bayard Rustin was National Chairman of SDUSA and also was President of the A. Philip Randolph Institute.

Rustin had had a long association with A. Philip Randolph and with pacifist movements. In 1956, Rustin advised Martin Luther King Jr. who was organizing the Montgomery bus boycott. According to Rustin: "I think it's fair to say that Dr. King's view of non-violent tactics was almost non-existent when the boycott began. In other words, Dr. King was permitting himself and his children and his home to be protected by guns". Rustin convinced King to abandon the armed protection. The following year, Rustin and King began organizing the Southern Christian Leadership Conference (SCLC).

Rustin and Randolph organized the March on Washington for Jobs and Freedom in 1963. On September 6, 1963, Rustin and Randolph appeared on the cover of Life magazine as "the leaders" of the March.

=== From protest to politics ===
After passage of the Civil Rights Act of 1964 and Voting Rights Act of 1965, Rustin advocated closer ties between the civil rights movement and the Democratic Party and its base among the working class.

With the assistance of Tom Kahn, Rustin wrote the 1965 article "From protest to politics", which analyzed the changing economy and its implications for black Americans. This article stated that the rise of automation would reduce the demand for low-skill high-paying jobs, which would jeopardize the position of the urban black working class, particularly in the Northern United States. To pursue its economic agenda, the black community needed to shift political strategy, strengthening its political alliance with mostly white unions and other organizations (churches, synagogs and the like). As its agenda shifted from civil rights to economic justice, the black community's tactics needed to shift from protest to politics, wrote Rustin. A particular danger facing the Negro community was the chimera of identity politics, particularly the rise of "Black Power", for which Rustin expressed contempt:

Wearing my hair Afro style, calling myself an Afro-American, and eating all the chitterlings I can find are not going to affect Congress.

Rustin wrote that "Black Power" repeated the moral errors of previous black nationalists while alienating the white allies needed by the black community.

=== Influence on William Julius Wilson ===
Rustin's analysis was supported by the later research by William Julius Wilson. Wilson documented an increase in inequality within the black community, following educated blacks moving into white suburbs and following the decrease of demand for low-skill labor as industry declined in the Northern United States. Such economic problems were not being addressed by a civil rights leadership focused on "affirmative action", a policy benefiting the truly advantaged within the black community. Wilson's criticism of the neglect of working class and poor African Americans by civil rights organizations led to his being mistaken for a conservative, despite his having identified himself as a Rustin-style social democrat. Wilson has served on the advisory board of Social Democrats, USA.

=== Labor movement, trade unions and social democracy ===
Rustin increasingly worked to strengthen the labor movement, which he saw as the champion of empowerment for the African American community and for economic justice for all Americans. He contributed to the labor movement's two sides, economic and political, through support of labor unions and social democratic politics.

He was the founder and became the Director of the A. Philip Randolph Institute, which coordinated the AFL–CIO's work on civil rights and economic justice. He became a regular columnist for the AFL–CIO newspaper.

On the political side of the labor movement, Rustin increased his visibility as a leader of the American social democracy. He was a founding National Co-chairman of Social Democrats, USA.

=== Human rights and ending discrimination against gays ===
Throughout the 1970s and 1980s, Rustin worked as a human rights and election monitor for Freedom House. He also testified on behalf of New York State's Gay Rights Bill. In 1986, he gave the speech "The new 'niggers' are gays" in which he asserted:

Today, blacks are no longer the litmus paper or the barometer of social change. Blacks are in every segment of society and there are laws that help to protect them from racial discrimination. The new "niggers" are gays. ... It is in this sense that gay people are the new barometer for social change. ... The question of social change should be framed with the most vulnerable group in mind: gay people.

Rustin also helped to write a report on peaceful means to end apartheid (racial segregation) in South Africa.

== Norman Hill ==
Norman Hill is an influential African American administrator, activist and labor leader.

Graduating in 1956, he was one of the first African Americans to graduate from Haverford College. Joining the civil rights movement and working in Chicago, Hill was an organizer for the Youth March for Integrated Schools and then Secretary of Chicago Area Negro American Labor Council and Staff Chairman of the Chicago March Conventions. In the Congress of Racial Equality (CORE), Hill was first the East Coast Field Secretary and then National Program Director. He assisted Bayard Rustin with organizing the 1963 March on Washington. As National Program Director of CORE, Hill coordinated the route 40 desegregation of restaurants, the Waldorf campaign, and illustrated the civil rights demonstration that took place at the 1964 Republican National Convention.

From 1964 to 1967, Norman Hill served as the Legislative Representative and Civil Rights Liaison of the Industrial Union Department of the AFL–CIO. He was involved in the issue of raising minimum wage and the labor delegation on the Selma to Montgomery marches against racial discrimination in politics and voting in the Southern United States.

In 1967, Hill became active in the A. Philip Randolph Institute. Hill began as associate director, but he later became executive director and finally President. As associate director, Hill coordinated and organized the Memphis March in 1968 after the assassination of Martin Luther King Jr. In his career at the A. Philip Randolph Institute, Hill created over two hundred local chapters of this organization across the United States.

== Tom Kahn ==
Tom Kahn was a leader of SDUSA, who made notable contributions to the civil rights movement and to the labor movement.

=== Civil rights ===
Kahn helped Rustin organize the 1957 Prayer Pilgrimage to Washington and the 1958 and 1959 Youth March for Integrated Schools. As a white student at historically black Howard University, Kahn and Norman Hill helped Rustin and A. Philip Randolph to plan the 1963 March on Washington, at which Martin Luther King Jr. delivered his "I Have a Dream" speech. Kahn's role in the civil rights movement was discussed in the eulogy by Rachelle Horowitz.

=== Support of Solidarity ===
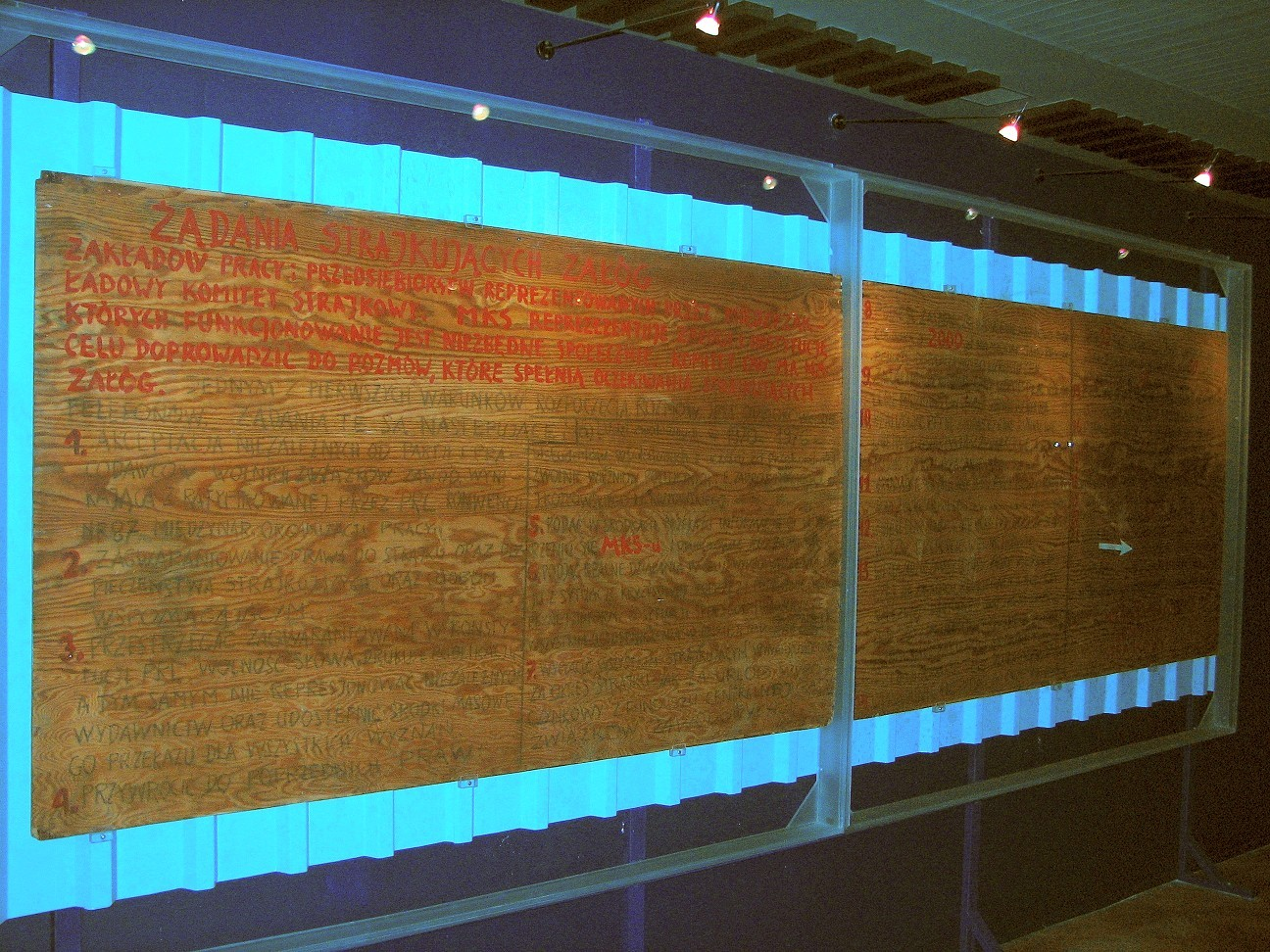
Solidarity's demand for legality was supported by Tom Kahn, who testified on behalf of the AFL–CIO to the Congress (the picture displays the 21 demands of MKS).

When he became an assistant to the President of the AFL–CIO from 1972 to 1986, Kahn developed an expertise in international affairs.

Kahn was deeply involved with supporting the Polish labor movement. The trade union Solidarity (Solidarność) began in 1980. The Soviet-backed communist regime headed by General Wojciech Jaruzelski declared martial law in December 1981. Lane Kirkland appointed Kahn to organize the AFL–CIO's support of Solidarity. Politically, the AFL–CIO supported the twenty-one demands of the Gdansk workers by lobbying to stop further U.S. loans to Poland unless those demands were met. Materially, the AFL–CIO established the Polish Workers Aid Fund, which raised almost $300,000 by 1981. These funds purchased printing presses and office supplies. The AFL–CIO donated typewriters, duplicating machines, a minibus, an offset press and other supplies requested by Solidarity.

The AFL–CIO sought approval in advance from Solidarity's leadership to avoid jeopardizing their position with unwanted or surprising American help. On September 12, Lech Wałęsa welcomed international donations with this statement: "Help can never be politically embarrassing. That of the AFL–CIO, for example. We are grateful to them. It was a very good thing that they helped us. Whenever we can, we will help them, too". Kahn explained the AFL–CIO position in a 1981 debate:

Solidarity made its needs known, with courage, with clarity, and publicly. As you know, the AFL–CIO responded by establishing a fund for the purchase of equipment requested by Solidarity and we have raised about a quarter of a million dollars for that fund.

This effort has elicited from the Soviet Union, Czechoslovakia, East Germany, and Bulgaria the most massive and vicious propaganda assault on the AFL–CIO ... in many, many years. The ominous tone of the most recent attacks leaves no doubt that if the Soviet Union invades, it shall cite the aid of the AFL-CIO as evidence of outside anti-Socialist intervention aimed at overthrowing the Polish state.

All this is by way of introducing the AFL–CIO's position on economic aid to Poland. In formulating this position, our first concern was to consult our friends in Solidarity .... We did consult with them ... and their views are reflected in the statement unanimously adopted by the AFL–CIO Executive Council.

The AFL–CIO will support additional aid to Poland only if it is conditioned on the adherence of the Polish government to the 21 points of the Gdansk Agreement. Only then could we be assured that the Polish workers will be in a position to defend their gains and to struggle for a fair share of the benefits of Western aid.

In testimony to the Joint Congressional Commission on Security and Cooperation in Europe, Kahn suggested policies to support the Polish people, in particular by supporting Solidarity's demand that the communist regime finally establish legality, by respecting the twenty-one rights guaranteed by the Polish constitution.

The AFL–CIO provided the most aid to Solidarity, but substantial additional aid was provided by Western-European labor unions, including the United Kingdom's Trades Union Congress and especially the Swedish Trade Union Confederation.

=== Criticism of AFL–CIO ===
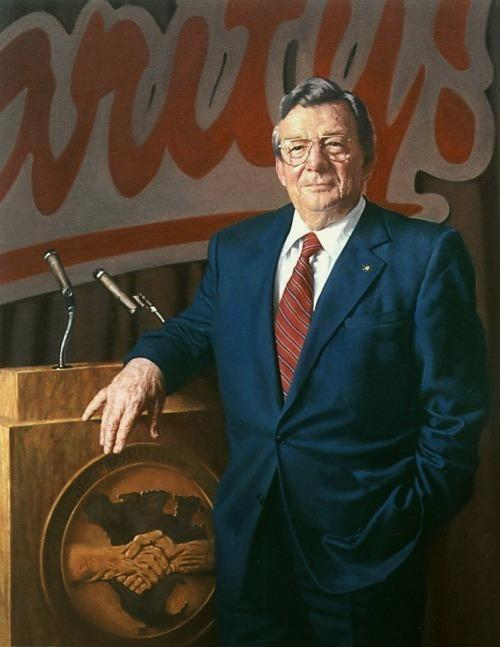
SDUSA leader Tom Kahn was appointed by Lane Kirkland (pictured), the President of the AFL–CIO after George Meany, to organize the AFL-CIO's aid to Solidarity, the Polish labor union that challenged communism in 1979.

The AFL–CIO's support enraged the Communist regimes of Eastern Europe and the Soviet Union. Its support worried the Carter administration, whose Secretary of State Edmund Muskie told Kirkland that the AFL–CIO's continued support of Solidarity could trigger a Soviet invasion of Poland. After Kirkland refused to withdraw support to Solidarity, Muskie met with the Soviet Ambassador Anatoly Dobyrnin, to clarify that the AFL–CIO's aid did not have the support of the United States government.

=== Aid through the 1980s ===
Later, the National Endowment for Democracy provided $1.7 million for Solidarity, which was transferred via the AFL–CIO. In both 1988 and 1989, the Congress allocated $1 million yearly to Solidarity via the AFL–CIO. In total, the AFL–CIO channeled 4 million dollars to Solidarity.

== Sandra Feldman ==
Sandra Feldman was an American civil rights activist, educator and labor leader who served as president of the American Federation of Teachers (AFT) from 1997 to 2004. On January 22, 1999, she helped to organize and was the keynote speaker at the SDUSA workshop on "American Labor in the New Economy: A Day of Dialogue".

=== Socialist activism ===
She became active in socialist politics and the civil rights movement. When she was 17 years old, she met civil rights activist Bayard Rustin, who became her mentor and close friend. During her early years in the civil rights movement, Feldman worked to integrate Howard Johnson's restaurants in Maryland. She soon became employment committee chairwoman of the Congress of Racial Equality in Harlem. She also participated in several Freedom Rides and was arrested twice.

=== Teaching ===
Upon graduation from Brooklyn College in 1962, Feldman worked for six months as a substitute third-grade teacher in East Harlem. She continued to be active in the civil rights movement, working to desegregate Howard Johnson restaurants in Maryland. She participated in the 1963 March on Washington for Jobs and Freedom, which was organized by Rustin and his associates. From 1963 to 1966, Feldman matriculated in a master's degree program in literature at New York University. While in graduate school, Feldman worked as a fourth-grade teacher at Public School 34 on the New York City's Lower East Side. She immediately joined the American Federation of Teachers, which had only one other member at the school. When New York City teachers won collective bargaining rights in 1960, she organized the entire school staff within a year. During this time, Feldman became an associate of Albert Shanker, then an organizer for the United Federation of Teachers.

=== United Federation of Teachers ===
In 1966, Shanker—now executive director of the UFT—hired Feldman as a full-time field representative on the recommendation of Rustin. Over the next nine years, Feldman became the union's executive director and oversaw its staff. She was elected its secretary (the second-most powerful position in the local) in 1983.

After just two years on the UFT staff, Feldman played a crucial role in the Ocean Hill-Brownsville strike. The city of New York had designated the Ocean Hill-Brownsville area of Brooklyn as one of three decentralized school districts in an effort to give the minority community more say in school affairs. The crisis began when the Ocean Hill-Brownsville governing board fired 13 teachers for allegedly sabotaging the decentralization experiment. Shanker demanded that specific charges be filed and the teachers given a chance to defend themselves in due process proceedings.

A protracted fight erupted between those in the community who supported the Ocean Hill-Brownsville board and those supported the UFT. Many supporters of the local school board resorted to racial invective. Shanker was branded a racist, and many African-Americans accused the UFT of being "Jewish-dominated". Feldman was often at the center of the strike. The UFT emerged from the crisis more powerful than ever and Feldman's hard work, good political judgment and calm demeanor won her widespread praise within the union. Shanker was elected president of the AFT in 1974, but he retained his post as UFT President. In 1986, Shanker retired as UFT President and Feldman was elected president.

=== UFT President after Shanker ===
Feldman was known for being a quietly effective leader of the UFT. She fought school system chancellors and mayors both, winning significantly higher wages and benefits as well as improved working conditions for her members. She lobbied fiercely for Bernard Gifford as New York City schools chancellor that Robert F. Wagner Jr., President of the New York City Board of Education, threatened to resign unless Feldman backed off and he was given a free hand.

She was instrumental in helping David Dinkins win election as mayor of New York in 1989 by using union members and resources to build a winning electoral coalition of black and white voters. However, once mayor Dinkins stalled on signing a new contract with the teachers' union and Feldman rarely criticized Dinkins publicly for his actions, but she kept the UFT out of Dinkins' 1993 re-election. Dinkins lost in a tight race to Rudy Giuliani.

=== American Federation of Teachers ===
Feldman had been elected an AFT vice president in 1974, serving on the national union's executive council and the executive council's executive committee.

After Shanker died in February 1997, Feldman won election as the AFT President in July 1998, becoming the union's first female president since 1930. Feldman re-emphasized the AFT's commitment to educational issues. She also renewed the union's focus on organizing: During her tenure, the AFT grew by more than 160,000 new members (about 17 percent). With Feldman as president, in 2002 AFT delegates approved a four-point plan: 1) building a "culture of organizing" throughout the union, 2) enhancing the union's political advocacy efforts, 3) engaging in a series of publicity, legislative, funding and political campaigns to strengthen the institutions in which AFT members work; and 4) recommitting the AFT to fostering democratic education and human rights at home and abroad. Feldman moved quickly to ensure that the plan was implemented.

In May 1997, Feldman was elected to the AFL–CIO executive council and appointed to the executive council's executive committee. During her tenure at the head of the AFT, Feldman also served as a vice president of Education International and was a board member of the International Rescue Committee and Freedom House.

Feldman died in 2005 at the age 65.

== Sidney Hook ==
Sidney Hook was an American pragmatic philosopher known for his contributions to public debates. A student of John Dewey, Hook continued to examine the philosophy of history, of education, politics and of ethics. He was known for his criticisms of totalitarianism and fascism. A pragmatic social democrat, Hook sometimes cooperated with conservatives, particularly in opposing communism. After World War II, he argued that members of conspiracies, like the Communist Party USA and other Leninist conspiracies, ethically could be barred from holding offices of public trust. Hook gave the keynote speech to the July 17–18, 1976 convention of SDUSA.

For the Social Democrat, democracy is not merely a political concept but a moral one. It is democracy as a way of life. What is "democracy as a way of life." It is a society whose basic institutions are animated by an equality of concern for all human beings, regardless of class, race, sex, religion, and national origin, to develop themselves as persons to their fullest growth, to be free to live up to their desirable potentials as human beings. It is possible for human beings to be politically equal as voters but yet so unequal in educational, economic, and social opportunities, that ultimately even the nature of their political equality is affected.

When it comes to the principled defense of freedom, and to opposition to all forms of totalitarianism, let it be said that to its eternal credit, the organized labor movement in the United States, in contradiction to all other sectors of American life, especially in industry, the academy and the churches, has never faltered, or trimmed its sails. Its dedication to the ideals of a free society has been unsullied. Its leaders have never been Munich-men of the spirit.

I want to conclude with a few remarks about the domestic scene and the role of Social Democrats, U.S. in it. We are not a political party with our own candidates. We are not alone in our specific programs for more employment, more insurance, more welfare, less discrimination, less bureaucratic inefficiency. Our spiritual task should be to relate these programs and demands to the underlying philosophy of democracy, to express and defend those larger moral ideals that should inform, programs for which we wish to develop popular support.

We are few in number and limited in influence. So was the Fabian Society of Great Britain. But in time it reeducated a great political party and much of the nation. We must try to do the same.

== Penn Kemble ==
Penn Kemble was an American political activist and a founding member of SDUSA. He supported free labor-unions and democracy in the United States and internationally and so was active in the civil rights movement, the labor movement and the social democratic opposition to communism. He founded organizations including Negotiations Now!, Frontlash and Prodemca. Kemble was appointed to various government boards and institutions throughout the 1990s, eventually becoming the acting director of the U.S. Information Agency under President Bill Clinton. After moving to New York, Kemble stood out as a neatly dressed, muscular Protestant youth in an urban political setting that was predominantly Catholic and Jewish. He worked at The New York Times, but was fired for refusing to cross a picket line during a typesetters' strike. A leader in the East River chapter of the Congress of Racial Equality, Kemble helped to organize a non-violent blockade of the Triborough Bridge during rush hour to raise consciousness among suburbanites of the lives of Harlem residents. Kemble was a founder of Negotiations Now!, a group which called for an end to the bombing of North Vietnam and a negotiated settlement of the Vietnam War. He was opposed to a unilateral withdrawal of American forces from Vietnam.

In 1972, Kemble was a founder the Coalition for a Democratic Majority (CDM), an association of centrist Democrats that opposed the "new politics" liberalism exemplified by Senator George McGovern, who suffered the worst defeat of a presidential candidate in modern times, despite the widespread dislike of Nixon. Kemble was executive director of CDM from 1972 to 1976, at which time he left to become a special assistant and speechwriter for Senator Daniel Patrick Moynihan. He remained with Moynihan until 1979. Concerned about the direct and indirect role of the Communist Party USA and of sympathizers of Marxist–Leninist politics in the American peace movement and in the National Council of Churches, Kemble helped found the Institute on Religion and Democracy. From 1981 until 1988, Kemble was the President of the Committee for Democracy in Central America (PRODEMCA), which opposed the Sandinistas and related groups in Central America.

Kemble supported the Bill Clinton's campaign for the presidency. During the Presidency of Bill Clinton, he served first in 1993 as the deputy director and then in 1999 as acting director of the United States Information Agency. He was also made a special representative of Secretary of State Madeleine K. Albright to the Community of Democracies Initiative.

In 2001, Kemble was appointed to the International Broadcasting Bureau by President George W. Bush. Kemble also became the Washington, D.C. representative of Freedom House and in his last years he was especially involved in supporting peace efforts in the Middle East. Secretary of State Colin L. Powell appointed Kemble to be the Chairman of the International Eminent Persons Group on Slavery, Abduction and Forced Servitude in Sudan. Despite being diagnosed with brain cancer, Kemble spent his last months organizing a conference on the contributions of Sidney Hook, the late pragmatic philosopher and SDUSA spokesperson; Carl Gershman took over the leadership of the conference after Kemble's cancer made it impossible for him to continue.

== Carl Gershman ==
Carl Gershman was the executive director of the SDUSA from 1975 to 1980. After having served as the Representative to the United Nations Committee on human rights during the first Reagan administration, Gershman has served as the President of the National Endowment for Democracy. After the Polish people overthrew communism, their elected government awarded the Order of the Knight's Cross to Gershman and posthumously the Order of the White Eagle to AFL–CIO President Lane Kirkland.
