= New America (newspaper) =

Socialist weekly (1960–1985)

- Founded: September 5, 1960
- Ceased publication: 1985; 41 years ago

New America was the weekly newspaper of the Socialist Party of America (officially, the Socialist Party-Social Democratic Federation).

The initial "prepublication issue" was dated Labor Day 5 September 1960 (66 years ago). New America remained the official journal of the Socialist Party after it changed its name to Social Democrats, USA (SDUSA) in December 1972. New America ceased publication in 1985 (41 years ago).

== Publication history ==
=== Establishment ===
New America was established in the fall of 1960 with a "prepublication issue" dated on September 5, Labor Day. The "special introductory rate" for the weekly publication was $3.00 per year. The official first issue of the publication, "Volume 1, Number 1," was dated October 18, 1960. Based in New York City, it touted itself as the "official publication of the Socialist Party-Social Democratic Federation.

The initial editor of New America was Michael Harrington, a frequent contributor to Dissent, Commentary, and other political publications. Contributors to the publication during its first year included Civil Rights activist Bayard Rustin, Socialist Party leader and frequent Presidential hopeful Norman Thomas, SP-SDF National Secretary Irwin Suall, anti-war activist David McReynolds, political scientist Seymour Martin Lipset, essayist James Baldwin, political historian Robert J. Alexander, AFL–CIO officer Tom Kahn, and novelist Upton Sinclair, among others. The paper also regularly reprinted cartoons by Jules Feiffer by special permission, material first published in the Village Voice.

Typical issues of the early publication consisted of 8 tabloid-sized pages. The paper was copiously illustrated.

In its early years, New America gave significant coverage to the struggle of African Americans for civil rights and urged an end to nuclear weapons testing.

=== 1960s ===
It published an extensive extract of the November 8, 1962 political trial of Nelson Mandela, the 44-year-old high ranking official of the African National Congress who was sentenced in a political trial to 5 years in prison — 3 years for "inciting people to strike" and 2 years for "leaving the Republic of South Africa without permission."

The publication opposed Marxist–Leninism, particularly the Soviet Union.

== Official circulation ==
"Statement of Ownership, Management and Circulation" figures published annually in conjunction with the Acts of October 23, 1962 and August 12, 1970.

| Report Year | Editor | Average Net Print Run | Ave. Mail Subscriptions | Ave. Total Paid Circulation | Source |
|---|---|---|---|---|---|
| 1960 | Michael Harrington | N/A | N/A | N/A | NA, v. 1, no. 3 (Nov. 15, 1960), pg. 4. |
| 1961 | Michael Harrington | N/A | N/A | 3,141 | NA, v. 1, no. 24 (Oct. 27, 1961), pg. 8. |
| 1962 | Michael Harrington | | | | NA, v. 2, no. 21 (Oct. 15, 1962), pg. 2. |
| 1963 | Paul Feldman | 7,000 | 4,250 | 4,250 | NA, v. 3, no. 19 (Nov. 15, 1963), pg. 7. |
| 1964 | Paul Feldman | 7,500 | 4,500 | 6,200 | NA, v. 4, no. 15 (Nov. 16, 1964), pg. 2. |
| 1965 | Paul Feldman | 8,000 | 4,600 | 6,350 | NA, v. 5, no. 14 (Dec. 18, 1965), pg. 11. |
| 1966 | Paul Feldman | 8,950 | 4,600 | 6,450 | NA, v. 6, no. 4 (Nov. 18, 1966), pg. 2. |
| 1967 | Carl Dahlgren | 5,000 | 3,200 | 4,000 | NA, v. 7, no. 1 (Oct. 16, 1967), pg. 2. |
| 1968 | Paul Feldman | 6,500 | 4,910 | 5,610 | NA, v. 7, no. 20 (Oct. 18, 1968), pg. 2. |
| 1969 | Paul Feldman | 7,500 | 5,000 | 5,900 | NA, v. 8, no. 20-21 (Dec. 30, 1969), pg. 6. |
| 1970 | Paul Feldman | 7,500 | 5,100 | 6,000 | NA, v. 9, no. 17 (Nov. 30, 1970), pg. 2. |
| 1971 | Paul Feldman | 7,800 | 5,300 | 6,300 | NA, v. 10, no. 9 (Nov. 30, 1971), pg. 2. |
| 1972 | Paul Feldman | 7,500 | 5,000 | 6,000 | NA, v. 10, no. 22 (Nov. 15, 1972), pg. 2. |
| 1973 | Paul Feldman | 7,500 | 5,200 | 6,225 | NA, v. 11, no. 19 (Jan. 30, 1974), pg. 4. |
| 1974 | Paul Feldman | 8,800 | 6,000 | 7,500 | NA, v. 12, no. 12 (Feb. 28, 1975), pg. 3. |
| 1975 | Paul Feldman & Arch Puddington (co-eds.) | | | | NA, v. 13, no. 6 (Nov. 1975), pg. 2. |
| 1976 | Arch Puddington | 6,000 | 4,500 | 5,000 | NA, v. 14, no. 1 (Jan.-Feb. 1977), pg. 11. |
| 1977 | Arch Puddington | 5,500 | 4,000 | 4,500 | NA, v. 14, no. 10 (Dec. 1977), pg. 11. |
| 1978 | Arch Puddington | 4,800 | 2,900 | 4,100 | NA, v. 15, no. 11 (Dec. 1978), pg. 11. |
| 1979 | Arch Puddington | 4,650 | 2,800 | 4,000 | NA, v. 16, no. 11 (Nov. 1979), pg. 2. |
| 1980 | Arch Puddington | 4,350 | 2,600 | 3,700 | NA, v. 17, no. 11 (Dec. 1980), pg. 2. |
| 1981 | Joel Freedman | 4,400 | 2,300 | 3,600 | NA, v. 18, no. 6 (Nov.-Dec. 1981), pg. 2. |
| 1982 | Lesley Chenoweth | 4,000 | 2,150 | 3,050 | NA, v. 19, no. 4 (Nov.-Dec. 1982), pg. 2. |
| 1983 | Lesley Chenoweth | 3,500 | 400 | 400 | NA, v. 21, no. 1 (Jan.-Feb. 1984), pg. 2. |
| 1984 | | | | | |
| 1985 | Dennis King | | | | NA, v. 22, no. 1 (Jan.-Feb. 1985), pg. 2. |
