= Irwin Suall =

American socialist, union organizer, civil rights activist, investigator and researcher

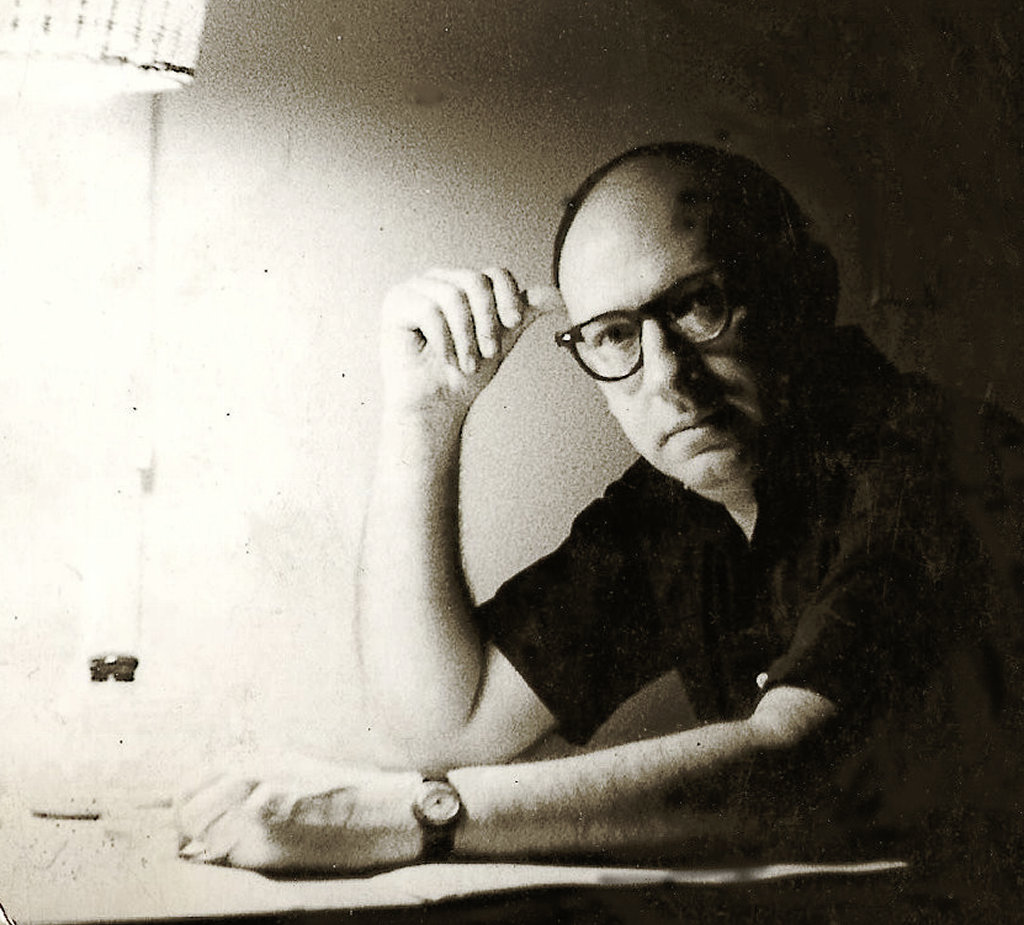
Portrait of Suall taken by his son.

Irwin Suall (1924 – 17 August 1998) was an American socialist, union organizer, civil rights activist, investigator and researcher. He was national director of fact-finding for the Anti-Defamation League from 1967 to 1997 in which capacity he directed that organization's undercover intelligence gathering on extremist groups.

== Career ==
Suall was born in 1924 on East Broadway in a former hospital (now functioning as the Bialystoker Home for the Agingon the Lower East Side) to immigrant parents, Abraham (a Russian emigre) and Flora (maiden name Rosen, from Poland). Suall grew up in Brownsville, Brooklyn, and graduated from Samuel Tilden High School. After briefly attending Brooklyn College, Suall joined the Merchant Marines in 1945, for three years. While a Merchant Marine, he visited Jewish refugees from Nazi-occupied Europe living in squalor in Shanghai. This experience left an indelible impression on him. After his stint in the Merchant Marines, Suall studied at Ruskin College, Oxford on a Fulbright scholarship. He graduated with a BA in political science in 1950. It was during his time at Oxford that Suall met fellow student and future wife Sarah Mountain.

Suall joined the Young Peoples Socialist League as a teenager. When he returned to the U.S. after studying in England, he briefly worked as head of public relations for the Jewish Labor Committee, education director for the International Ladies Garment Workers Union and national secretary for the Socialist Party–Social Democratic Federation. In the latter capacity, he was instrumental in convincing Norman Thomas and others to allow individual members of the Independent Socialist League, sometimes known as Shatchmanites, to join with the party. During that period, Suall was ejected from the Soviet consulate in New York when he and William Lusk tried to present a protest to Arkady Sobolev, the USSR's representative to the United Nations'. They were protesting the execution of Imre Nagy, Nicolas Gimes and other Hungarians.

In 1957, Suall replaced Herman Singer as Executive Secretary of the Socialist Party of America. He would remain in that role until 1962. Suall was a close friend and colleague of civil rights activist and social democrat Bayard Rustin, who served as an important advisor to Martin Luther King. That friendship led to Rustin inviting Suall to join the organizing committee for the 1963 March on Washington for Jobs and Freedom. He would join the ADL as director of fact finding in 1967. The Arab–Israeli 1967 Six-Day War had a profound effect on him. He visited Israel shortly thereafter and returned to the U.S. "a changed man" according to ADL head Abraham Foxman. His attitude towards socialism apparently changed, and he "began to realize that his efforts on behalf of democracy and human dignity were part of a larger Jewish struggle". He became fact-finding director of the ADL that year and his work "reinforced his growing awareness of the intimate linkages between extremism, totalitarianism, and anti-Semitism".

Meanwhile, Suall was still active in the factional struggles within the Socialist party. He became aligned with a Shactmanite faction against the "new politics" wing led by Michael Harrington and others. At the Socialist Party's final convention in December 1972, he and James Glazer presented a majority report urging that the group's name be changed to Social Democrats, USA (SDUSA). This action was approved by a 73–34 vote. Afterwards, Harrington resigned his SDUSA membership and founded the Democratic Socialist Organizing Committee.

During his years with the ADl, he monitored hate groups of the far left and right. He employed a network of informants inside some of those hate groups. In some cases the information he collected was shared with both FBI and local law enforcement. That information lead to the arrest and prosecution of numerous individuals including the killers of Ethiopean immigrant Mulugeta Seraw in Portland and Michael Donald in Mobile, Alabama. Suall then partnered with Morris Dees of the Southern Poverty Law Center to sue both the Mobile chapter of the KKK and Tom Metzgar of the White Aryan Resistance. The suit against Tom Metzgar resulted in the loss of all his broadcasting equipment, effectively ending the WAR as an organization. And the suit against the Mobile, Alabama KKK chapter resulted in the bankrupting of the KKK's last original chapter and the award of their downtown headquarters and property to the mother of the victim. His investigative work into Lyndon LaRouche also contributed to Larouche's conviction and imprisonment for credit card and bank fraud. During his years with the ADL Suall made numerous national TV appearances including the Oprah Winfrey Show, Phil Donahue, Sally Jesse Raphael, CBS News and local television in New York City. He was frequently quoted in the NY Times and profiled at the time of his death in an obit titled ''Irwin J. Suall, Fierce Fighter Of Bias for A.D.L., Dies at 73'' [NY Times Aug. 20, 1998]. His work with the ADL was not without controversy. He was sued by the Lyndon LaRouche lead US Labor Party. Judge Michael Dontzin granted ADL summary judgement and dismissed the lawsuit in April 1979 and upheld ADL's right to label the group "anti-Semitic." He was also criticized for expanding the focus of his activities to Black nationalist, Arab and leftist groups as well as far-right organizations. Suall remained as head of the Anti-Defamation Leagues fact-finding department until 1997, when his fight with emphysema forced him to retire.

He died of emphysema in August 1998.

== Personal life ==
While attending Oxford, Suall met and married fellow student Sarah [Sally] Mountain in 1949. For a time, Mountain was an assistant to the director of SANE, the world's first nuclear disarmament organization. Mountain died in 1969; however, they had a son together, Mark, a New York City musician. Suall's brother Bert and sister-in-law Joan were also active in the Socialist Party and the SDUSA.

== Works ==
- This is Socialism! New York: Young People's Socialist League, 1950
- The American Ultras: The Extreme Right and the Military-Industrial Complex. New York: New America. 1962. ASIN B002JYQUQS. LCCN 62001461.
- Anti-Semitism in the United States, 1972 New York: Anti-Defamation League of B'nai B'rith, 1972 ASIN B00071C1OK
- Extremism Targets the Prisons New York Anti-Defamation League of B'nai B'rith, 1986
- Shaved for Battle: Skinheads Target America's Youth (with David Lowe and Michael Lieberman) New York: Anti-Defamation League of B'nai B'rith, 1987, ASIN B00071ADB8
- The Skinheads: An Update on Shaved for Battle (with David Lowe) New York: Anti-Defamation League of B'nai B'rith, 1988 ASIN B00071WQWC
- Young and Violent: The Growing Menace of America's Neo-Nazi Skinheads (with David Lowe and Tal Recanati) New York: Anti-Defamation League of B'nai B'rith, 1988, ASIN B00071REI8
- The 1989 IHR Conference: White-Washing Genocide Scientifically (with David Lowe) New York: Anti-Defamation League of B'nai B'rith, 1989
- Skinheads Target the Schools (with David Lowe and Tal Recanati) New York: Anti-Defamation League of B'nai B'rith, 1989 ASIN: B00071YH1A
- Electronic Hate: Bigotry Comes to TV (with Thomas Halpern) New York: Anti-Defamation League of B'nai B'rith, 1991
- The KKK today: a 1991 status report (with Linda Greenstein and Thomas Halpern) New York: Anti-Defamation League of B'nai B'rith, 1991, ASIN B0006D5OWU
- Young Nazi Killers: The Rising Skinhead Danger (with Thomas Halpern) New York: Anti-Defamation League of B'nai B'rith, 1993, ASIN B0006P961I
- The Klan Splits: A Radical Breakaway Fact-Finding Report (with Thomas Halpern and Michael A Sandberg) New York: Anti-Defamation League of B'nai B'rith, 1994
- The Skinhead International: A Worldwide Survey of Neo-Nazi skinheads. New York: Anti-Defamation League of B'nai B'rith. 1994. ISBN 978-0884641667.
