= Social Democrats, USA =

Social democratic political organization in the United States

- Abbreviation: SDUSA
- Founded: December 30, 1972 (53 years ago)
- Preceded by: Socialist Party of America
- Newspaper: New America (1972–1985); Socialist Currents (after 2011)
- Youth wing: Young Social Democrats
- Membership (2026): ~200
- Ideology: Social democracy; Democratic socialism; Anti-communism
- Political position: Center-left to left-wing
- International affiliation: Socialist International (1973–2005)
- Colors: Red

Website
- socialistcurrents.org

Social Democrats, USA (SDUSA) is a social democratic organization in the United States. SDUSA formed in 1972 as the successor to the Socialist Party of America (SPA), which splintered into three: SDUSA; the Democratic Socialist Organizing Committee; and the Socialist Party USA.

SDUSA describes itself as committed to the broader democratic socialist tradition, but is firmly anti-communist and used "social democrat" rather than "socialist" to disassociate the group from the Soviet Union.

SDUSA supports a political realignment strategy which aims to shift the Democratic Party toward social democracy by building a coalition of trade unions, particularly the AFL–CIO, civil rights organizations, and other working-class constituencies.

Notable SDUSA members include Bayard Rustin, Norman Hill, Tom Kahn, Paul and Sandra Feldman, Robert J. Alexander, Carl Gershman, Albert Glotzer, Sidney Hook, Penn Kemble, A. Philip Randolph, August Tyler, Charles S. Zimmerman and Rachelle Horowitz of the American Federation of Teachers.

== Membership ==
In 1973, SDUSA reported having 1,800 members. In 1992, SDUSA had about 500 members.

Membership dues were paid annually and included a subscription to SDUSA's official publication, the tabloid-format newspaper New America. In 1983, the annual dues rate was $25.

SDUSA was governed by biannual conventions that included participation from interested observers. These conventions featured discussions and debates on proposed resolutions, some of which were adopted as official organizational statements. The conventions often included guest speakers from outside SDUSA, ranging from neoconservatives such as Jeane Kirkpatrick to democratic socialists like Paul Berman, along with a variety of academic, political, and labor union leaders. These gatherings also served as reunions for political activists and intellectuals who had collaborated over extended periods.

== History ==
=== Origins ===
By the early 1970s, the Socialist Party of America (SPA) was publicly associated with civil rights and labor union leader A. Philip Randolph and with author Michael Harrington. Prior to the party's 1972 convention, Harrington had resigned from his role as an Honorary Chairperson, citing dissatisfaction with the organization's lack of support for George McGovern's 1972 presidential campaign and its stance on the Vietnam War.

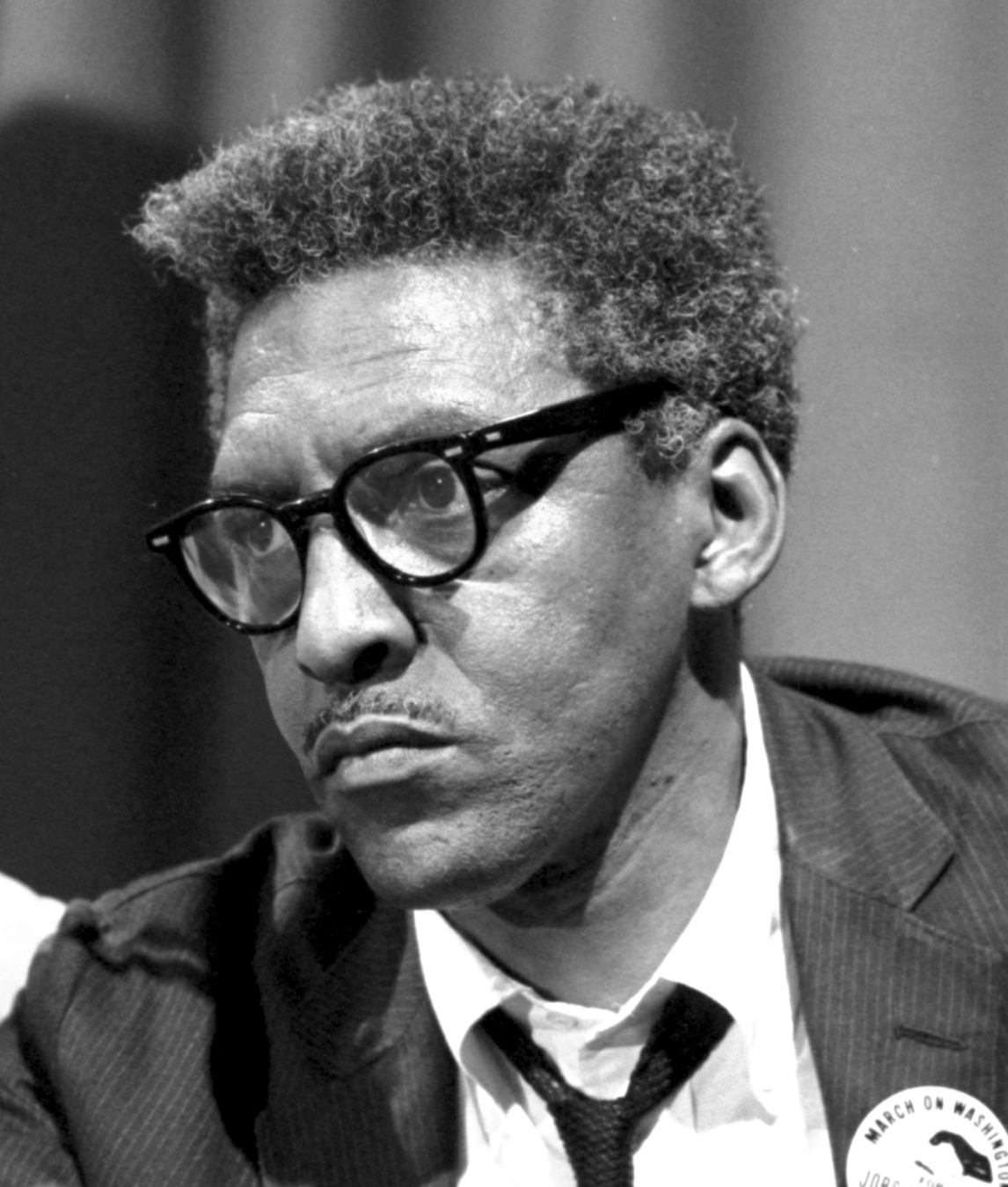
National Chairman Bayard Rustin in 1963

At the 1972 convention, the SPA was led by two Co-Chairmen: Bayard Rustin and Charles S. Zimmerman, along with First National Vice Chairman James S. Glaser, all of whom were re-elected by acclamation. In his opening address, Rustin urged the organization to oppose the policies of the Nixon administration and criticized what he described as the "irresponsibility and élitism of the 'New Politics' liberals".

The convention voted 73 to 34 to change the organization's name from the Socialist Party of America to Social Democrats, USA (SDUSA). The name change was intended to reflect the organization's decision to cease running its own candidates for public office and to address public confusion over the term “socialism,” which was often associated with Marxism–Leninism. According to the majority report, the term “party” was seen as misleading since the SPA had last run a presidential candidate, Darlington Hoopes, in the 1956 election. The organization also sought to differentiate itself from smaller Marxist parties such as the Socialist Workers Party and the Socialist Labor Party.

The Unity Caucus, which represented the majority faction, prevailed in all votes during the convention, generally by a two-to-one margin. A national committee of 33 members was elected, including 22 members from the Unity Caucus, eight from Harrington's Coalition Caucus, two from the left-wing Debs Caucus, and one independent, Samuel H. Friedman. Friedman and the minority caucuses opposed the name change.

The convention also adopted a new program by a similar two-to-one vote. The program called for a firm approach to what it termed “Communist aggression” in foreign affairs, opposed "any efforts to bomb Hanoi into submission", and advocated for a negotiated peace settlement in Vietnam that would protect communist cadres in South Vietnam from retaliation. A proposal by Harrington for a ceasefire and immediate U.S. military withdrawal was defeated. Harrington later criticized the organization for issuing only a qualified endorsement of McGovern and for what he viewed as insufficient mobilization on McGovern's behalf. In response, Unity Caucus member Arch Puddington stated that the California branch had actively supported McGovern, while the New York branch focused on a congressional campaign.

Following the convention and name change, Rustin became the organization's public spokesperson. Rustin stated that SDUSA aimed to transform the Democratic Party into a social democratic party, with a political realignment strategy associated with Max Shachtman.

=== 1972 splits ===
Several months after the convention, Harrington and members of his Coalition Caucus resigned from SDUSA and formed the Democratic Socialist Organizing Committee (DSOC), which later became the Democratic Socialists of America.

Members of the Debs Caucus also left SDUSA, with some forming the Socialist Party USA.

=== 1970s ===
The leadership of SDUSA emphasized the role of the American labor movement in advancing civil rights and economic justice. The organization's domestic program reflected the ideas presented in Bayard Rustin's article From Protest to Politics, which examined the evolving economic landscape and its impact on Black Americans. In the article, Rustin argued that the rise of automation would reduce the availability of low-skill, high-paying jobs, thereby threatening the position of the urban Black working class, particularly in the Northern United States. He advocated for a strategic shift in political engagement, urging the Black community to strengthen alliances with predominantly white labor unions and other institutions, such as churches and synagogues, to pursue a shared economic agenda. Rustin described this transition as a move "from protest to politics".

Rustin opposed identity politics in the Black community and the Black Power movement. He saw it as an ideology common among middle-class Black Americans, echoing earlier Black nationalist movements he considered misguided. He believed it risked alienating white allies, whom he viewed as essential to achieving broader political goals.

SDUSA publications echoed similar criticisms regarding the increasing influence of middle-class activists within the Democratic Party. Members expressed concern over what they viewed as the disproportionate influence of peace activists associated with the “New Politics” movement, particularly those aligned with Senator George McGovern. McGovern's 1972 presidential candidacy was characterized by SDUSA members as detrimental to both the Democratic Party and the United States.

The founding leadership of SDUSA generally supported an immediate end to the bombing of North Vietnam and advocated for a negotiated settlement to conclude the Vietnam War. However, the majority opposed a unilateral withdrawal of American forces, warning that such an action could result in the destruction of independent labor unions and political opposition groups in South Vietnam. Following the U.S. withdrawal from Vietnam and the subsequent victory of the Communist Party of Vietnam and the Viet Cong, SDUSA supported humanitarian aid for refugees and criticized Senator McGovern for his lack of support for such assistance.

SDUSA also sought to influence electoral politics through candidate endorsements. At its 1976 national convention in New York City, the group endorsed the Democratic presidential ticket of Jimmy Carter and Walter Mondale, committing to work actively for their election.

SDUSA opposed the New Left, attributing Democratic Party candidate George McGovern’s loss in the 1972 presidential election in part to the movement's influence.

=== 1980s ===
SDUSA published a newsletter and occasional position papers. The organization issued public statements in support of labor unions, both domestically and internationally, and also expressed support for Zionism, the State of Israel, and the Israeli labor movement.

From 1979 to 1989, SDUSA organized support for Solidarity, the independent labor union of Poland. Tom Kahn, who organized the AFL–CIO's support for Solidarity and was affiliated with SDUSA, argued that the democracy promotion should extend to countries under Soviet influence. In 1981, leading Social Democrats advocated using economic aid to Poland as leverage to promote freedom of association.

During the 1980 Democratic Party presidential primaries, which included a challenge from Ted Kennedy against incumbent President Carter, SDUSA took a less prominent role and postponed its convention until after the general election. The election of Republican candidate Ronald Reagan in the 1980 presidential election was attributed by the organization to the Democratic Party's failure to maintain support from its traditional working-class base.

In early 1980, Carl Gershman, who had long served as SDUSA's National Director, resigned and was succeeded by Rita Freedman, who had previously been the organizer and chair of the organization's New York local.

=== 1990s ===
Michael Harrington and Tom Kahn had both been associated with Marxist theorist Max Shachtman. Internal divisions within the AFL–CIO in 1995 were described as a split between “Shachtmanite” Social Democrats, who supported Lane Kirkland and Thomas Donahue, and the “Harringtonite” Democratic Socialists of America, who supported John Sweeney.

=== Hiatus and 2005 re-foundation ===
Following the death of the organization's Notesonline editor Penn Kemble on October 15, 2005, SDUSA entered a period of organizational inactivity. During this hiatus, no additional issues of the online newsletter were produced, and the organization's website was no longer updated.

After several years of inactivity, efforts were made to revive the organization. In 2008, a group initially composed primarily of SDUSA members from Pennsylvania initiated the process of re-establishing the organization. A re-founding convention was held on May 3, 2009, during which a new National Executive Committee was elected.

=== 2009 split ===
In 2009, internal disagreements split SDUSA. A faction based in Johnstown, Pennsylvania, separated from the newly elected National Executive Committee. The Johnstown-based group adopted the name Social Democrats, USA – Socialist Party USA, while the other continued under the name Social Democrats, USA.

== Controversies ==
=== Neoconservatism ===
Some members of SDUSA, including Penn Kemble and Joshua Muravchik, were associated with neoconservatism.

Michael Harrington asserted that SDUSA exhibited an “obsessive anti-communism" which, in his view, rendered the organization politically right-wing.

Author Justin Vaïsse has referred to some members of SDUSA as right-wing social democrats, a characterization described as a taunt by Ben Wattenberg.

In 2013, The Washington Post identified some former SDUSA members as neoconservatives.

Joshua Muravchik, a former SDUSA member, has identified as a neoconservative. At the 2003 SDUSA conference, Muravchik's pro-war remarks were met with criticism from several SDUSA members. Rachelle Horowitz, an SDUSA figure and event organizer, objected to his use of "us and them" rhetoric and his invocation of the term "evil." Other attendees, including Jeffrey Herf and Paul Berman, voiced similar criticisms.

=== Influence on United States foreign policy ===
Leaders from SDUSA have served in various presidential administrations since the 1980s. The participation of some members in Republican administrations has been a subject of controversy. Journalist Mark Massing (1987) referred to SDUSA members such as Carl Gershman as “State Department socialists,” and in 1987 claimed that the foreign policy of the Ronald Reagan administration was being influenced by Trotskyists. This claim was characterized as a “myth” by political sociologist Seymour Martin Lipset (1988, p. 34) in 1988.

The association between former Trotskyists and U.S. foreign policy was expanded upon in 2003 by journalist Michael Lind, who argued that individuals with Trotskyist origins had exerted significant influence over the foreign policy of the George W. Bush administration. Lind's "amalgamation of the defense intellectuals with the traditions and theories of "the largely Jewish-American Trotskyist movement [in Lind's words]" was criticized in 2003 by University of Michigan professor Alan M. Wald, Wald, who had discussed Trotskyism and neoconservatism in his history of "the New York intellectuals" objected to the amalgamation of ideological and ethnic categories. Allegations that former Trotskyists influenced Bush-era foreign policy, including references to SDUSA, have also appeared in writings by paleoconservatives.

== Conventions ==
Convention	Location	Date	Notes and references
1973 National Conference	Hopewell Junction, New York	September 21–23, 1973	From registration ad, New America, July 30, 1973, p. 7.
1974 National Convention	New York City	September 6–8, 1974	125 delegates, keynote speaker Walter Laqueur. Per New America, August 20, 1974, p. 8.
1976 National Convention	New York City	July 17–18, 1976	500 delegates and observers, keynote speaker Sidney Hook. Per New America, August–September 1976, p. 1.
1978 National Convention	New York City	September 8–10, 1978	Introductory report by Carl Gershman. Per New America, October 1978, p. 1.
1980 National Convention	New York City	November 21–23, 1980	Per New America, December 1980, p. 1.
1982 National Convention	Washington, D.C.	December 3–5, 1982	Keynote speech by Albert Shanker. Dates per New America, October 1982, p. 8.
1985 National Convention	Washington, D.C.	June 14–16, 1985	Keynote speech by Alfonso Robelo. Per New America, November–December 1985, p. 6.
1987 National Convention			
1990 National Convention			
1994 National Convention			
2009 Reorganization Convention		May 3, 2009	
2010 Convention	Internet teleconference	September 1, 2010	Guest speakers Herb Engstrom of the California Democratic Party Executive Committee and Roger Clayman, Executive Director of the Long Island Labor Federation.
2012 National Convention	Buffalo, New York	August 26–27, 2012	Keynote address by Richard Lipsitz, Executive Director of the Western New York Labor Federation.
2014 Convention	Pittsburgh, Pennsylvania	October 23–24, 2014	
2023 National Convention	Buffalo, New York	September 1–6, 2023	Speakers included Imre Komjáthi, co-chair of the Hungarian Socialist Party, former Democratic statehouse representative in Topeka, Aaron Coleman, and Godden Zama, representative of the Social Democratic Front (Cameroon)

== See also ==
- American Left
- Democratic Socialists of America
- Socialist Party of America
- Green Party of the United States
- History of left-wing politics in the United States
