= Carl Gershman =

American civil servant (born 1943)

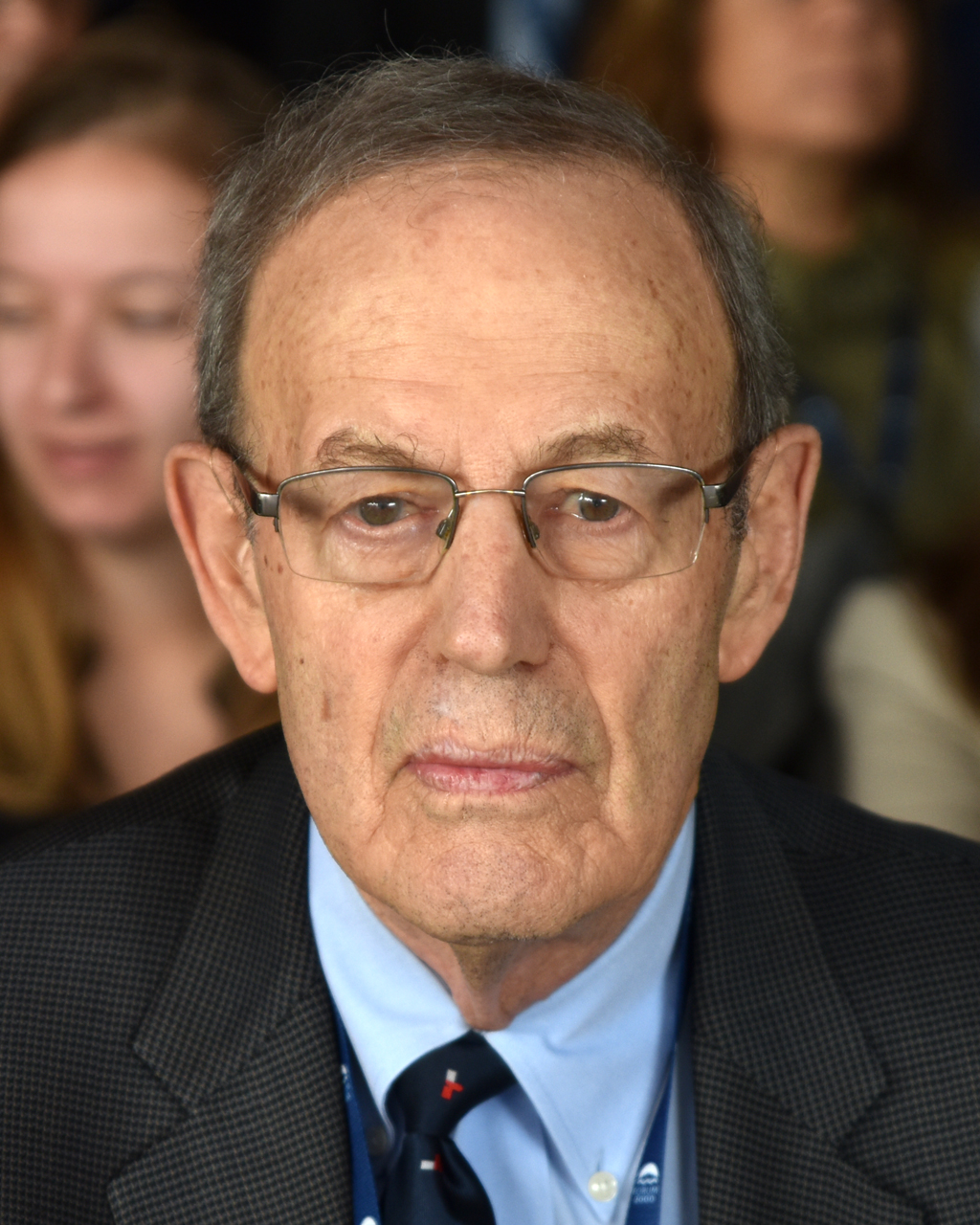
- Gershman in 2024

President of the National Endowment for Democracy
- In office 1984–2021
- Succeeded by: Damon Wilson

Personal details
- Born: July 20, 1943 (age 83) New York City, New York, U.S.
- Education: Yale University (BA); Harvard University (MEd)

Carl Gershman (born July 20, 1943) served from 1984 to 2021 as the founding president of the National Endowment for Democracy (NED), a private, congressionally-funded, grant-making institution that supports non-governmental groups working for democracy around the world. During his presidency, NED's annual congressional appropriation grew from $18.5 million in 1984 to $300 million a year in 2021, when it funded nearly 2,000 projects in 100 countries.

Gershman also initiated a range of activities aimed at supplementing the grants program through democracy research, advocacy and networking, including the International Forum for Democratic Studies, the Journal of Democracy, the World Movement for Democracy, the Reagan-Fascell Democracy Fellows Program, and the Center for International Media Assistance. Prior to the NED, Gershman was senior counselor to the U.S. ambassador to the United Nations, Jeane Kirkpatrick, and was Alternate U.S. Representative to the U.N. Security Council during the first term of the Reagan administration. Gershman was also a resident scholar at Freedom House (1980) and executive director of Social Democrats, USA (1974–1980).

== Early life and education ==
Gershman was born into a Jewish family in New York City on July 20, 1943. In 1961, he graduated magna cum laude from the Horace Mann Preparatory School in the Riverdale section of The Bronx. As an undergraduate at Yale University, he was active in the Yale Civil Rights Council, and volunteered in Mississippi and Alabama.

In 1965, he graduated magna cum laude from Yale University with a Bachelor of Arts degree and was inducted into Phi Beta Kappa.

== Career ==
From 1965 to 1967, Gershman served with Volunteers in Service to America in Pittsburgh, which was a domestic version of the Peace Corps. In 1968 he graduated with a Master of Education from the Harvard Graduate School of Education.

In 1968, he worked in the research department of B'nai B'rith. From 1969 to 1971, he was Research Director at the A. Philip Randolph Institute, where he was an assistant to its director, Bayard Rustin.

From 1969 to 1974, Gershman served as director of research, co-chairman, and executive director of the Youth Committee for Peace in the Middle East, where he also edited the organization's magazine Crossroads. In 1972, he served on the governing council of the American Jewish Committee.

In 1972, Gershman and Irving Howe edited a collection, Israel, the Arabs and the Middle East. Gershman also served on the editorial board of Dissent magazine, which was edited by Howe.

=== Social Democrats USA ===
In a 2006 interview with the Australian Broadcasting Corporation, Gershman said, "I have to confess that, in my early youth, I was a kind of a social democrat of sorts; I'm now really a democrat; I'm non-partisan." From 1970 to 1974, Carl Gershman was a national leader of the Young People's Socialist League (YPSL), the youth section of the Socialist Party of America; he served as Vice Chairman, Co-chairman, and then Chairman of YPSL.

As YPSL's vice chairman in December 1972, he authored a 13-page, singly spaced, international-affairs document which called for the Castro regime in Cuba to stop funding guerrilla movements and to begin "loosening the bonds" of repression; the document was approved and an alternative document calling for the U.S. government to recognize Cuba's government was defeated. YPSL criticized the "new politics" led by George McGovern, which had lost 49 of 50 states to Richard Nixon in the 1972 election.

At the Socialist Party convention in December 1972, Gershman introduced the international program, which was approved by a two to one vote; the losing alternative, proposed by Michael Harrington, called for an immediate withdrawal of U.S. forces from Vietnam, while the majority resolution called for a negotiated peace settlement. At the convention, the Socialist Party changed its name to Social Democrats USA (SDUSA) by a vote of 73 to 34. Harrington resigned from SDUSA and founded the Democratic Socialist Organizing Committee (DSOC) in 1973. In 1975, Gershman published a monograph on the foreign policy of the American labor movement.

From 1975 to January 1980, Gershman served as executive director of SDUSA. In 1980, he debated Michael Harrington on the topic of foreign policy.

Gershman served as the U.S. ambassador to the United Nations Human Rights Council during the first term of the Reagan Administration.

=== National Endowment for Democracy ===
In 1984, Gershman was appointed president of the National Endowment for Democracy. In a 2006 interview with the Australian Broadcasting Corporation, Gershman said

"I'm non-partisan; I try to bring Democrats and Republicans together in the United States, which is not that easy because we're very divided politically, today. And also, people from the business community and the trade union movement and intellectuals, and so forth, and try and bring people together around a common democratic faith and philosophy."

In a 1982 speech at the Palace of Westminster, President Ronald Reagan proposed an initiative "to foster the infrastructure of democracy--the system of a free press, unions, political parties, universities." The U.S. government, through USAID, contracted the American Political Foundation to study democracy promotion, which came to be known as "The Democracy Program." The program recommended the creation of a bipartisan, private, non-profit corporation to be known as the National Endowment for Democracy (NED). Under the program, NED, while non-governmental, would be funded primarily through annual appropriations from the U.S. government and subject to congressional oversight.

NED was established the following year, in 1983, by an Act of Congress. The House Foreign Affairs Committee proposed legislation to provide initial funding of $31.3 million for NED as part of the State Department Authorization Act (H.R. 2915). Included in the legislation was $13.8 million for the Free Trade Union Institute, an affiliate of the AFL-CIO, much of which went to support Solidarity), a Polish labor union, $2.5 million for an affiliate of the U.S. Chamber of Commerce, and $5 million each for two party institutes. The conference report on H.R. 2915 was adopted by the House on November 17, 1983, and by the U.S. Senate the following day. On November 18, 1983, articles of incorporation were filed in Washington, D.C. to establish the National Endowment for Democracy as a nonprofit organization.

NED is structured to act as a grant-making foundation, distributing funds to private non-governmental organizations for the purpose of promoting democracy abroad. Approximately half of NED's funding is allocated annually to four main U.S. organizations: the American Center for International Labor Solidarity (ACILS), the Center for International Private Enterprise (CIPE), the National Democratic Institute for International Affairs (NDI), and the International Republican Institute (IRI). The other half of NED's funding is awarded annually to hundreds of non-governmental organizations based abroad, which apply for support.

Gershman openly stated that the NED did overtly what the CIA once did covertly. Among the shapers of the NED's agenda were Madeleine Albright and John McCain.

On August 10, 2020, Gershman, along with 10 other U.S. individuals, was sanctioned by the Chinese government for "behaving badly on Hong Kong-related issues".

In 2021, Gershman was the subject of a hoax by Russian comedians Vladimir Kuznetsov and Alexey Stolyarov, who convinced Gershman and other NED officials they were speaking remotely to Svetlana Tikhanovskaya, the Belarusian opposition leader, and an aide. Gersham said the NED "support many, many groups and we have a very, very active program throughout the country", and NED had contact with the chief aide to Russian opposition leader Alexei Navalny.

Gershman retired as president of NED in summer 2021.

== Publications ==
- Gershman, Carl (December 1975), The foreign policy of American labor, SAGE policy papers, vol. 3, Center for Strategic and International Studies, Georgetown University, Washington D.C. (Washington Papers 29), SAGE Publications, pp. 1–82, ISBN 978-0-8039-0572-6
- Gershman, Carl (1978), Capitalism, socialism, and democracy, SD Papers, vol. 1, discussions also by Sidney Hook, Bayard Rustin, and Penn Kemble, New York: Social Democrats, USA, pp. 7–9, Selected Reprints from Commentary (April 1978) pp. 29–71
- Rustin, Bayard; Gershman, Carl (1978). Africa, Soviet imperialism and the retreat of American power. SD papers. Vol. 2. New York: Social Democrats, USA.
- Gershman, Carl (May 1978). "After the dominoes fell". Commentary. SD papers. 3. New York: Social Democrats, USA: 89–93.
- Gershman, Carl (1978). The world according to Andrew Young. SD papers. Vol. 4. New York: Social Democrats, USA. Reprinted from Commentary (August 1978).
- Gershman, Carl (1979). Selling them the rope: Business and the Soviets. SD papers. Vol. 6. New York: Social Democrats, USA. Reprinted from Commentary (April 1979).
- Gershman, Carl (November 3, 1980). "Totalitarian menace (Controversies: Detente and the left after Afghanistan)". Society. 18 (1). New York: Transactions (purchased by Springer): 9–15. doi:10.1007/BF02694835. ISSN 0147-2011. S2CID 189883991.
- Gershman, Carl (1993), "The polity: Commentary", in Freedman, Rita (ed.), Does America need a social democratic movement?, Following commentary by Jim Chapin (pp. 86–89) on panel presentations by Seymour Martin Lipset (pp. 71–75), Will Marshall (pp. 76–81), and Fred Siegel (pp. 81–86), chaired by Ronald Radosh (p. 85), Washington, DC: Social Democrats, USA, pp. 89–93, Gershman discusses American social democracy as a form of radical-democratic Americanism, which has been properly inspired more by Thomas Jefferson, James Madison, and Woodrow Wilson than by Karl Marx and Eduard Bernstein.
- Gershman, Carl (December 12, 2003), A democracy strategy for the Middle East, National Endowment for Democracy
- Gershman, Carl; Gutierrez, Orlando (January 2009). "Ferment in civil society (Can Cuba change?)" (PDF). Journal of Democracy. 20 (1): 36–54. doi:10.1353/jod.0.0051. S2CID 144413653. Archived from the original (PDF) on September 18, 2009.
- Gershman, Carl (August 29, 2011), Remarks by Carl Gershman at a photo exhibition commemorating the 30th anniversary of the founding of Solidarity (The phenomenon of Solidarity: Pictures from the history of Poland, 1980-1981; Woodrow Wilson Center), Washington D.C.: National Endowment for Democracy

== Awards ==
- The Polish government awarded the Order of the Knight's Cross
- award from Romania
- from the Chinese Education Democracy Foundation
- Light of Truth Award from the International Campaign for Tibet
- President's Award from George Washington University
- In 2019, the government of the Taiwanese Republic of China awarded Gershman the Order of Brilliant Star with Grand Cordon
