= Norman Hill =

American civil rights activist (born 1933)

Norman Hill (born April 22, 1933 in Summit, New Jersey) is an American administrator, civil rights activist and labor leader. He attended Haverford College in Pennsylvania and received a bachelor's degree in 1956 in the field of sociology. He was one of the first African-Americans to graduate from Haverford. After college, Hill served in the military. After returning from military service, he moved to Chicago to join the Civil Rights Movement. He also pursued a master's degree at the University of Chicago School of Social Welfare, but he dropped out in favor of more direct social action. Hill was appointed Chicago Coordinator for the Civil Rights Movement, and held various positions in projects around Chicago. These included Youth March for Integrated Schools, Secretary of Chicago Area Negro American Labor Council, and Staff Chairman of the Chicago March Conventions.

Another endeavor Hill joined was the Congress of Racial Equality. In this organization, Hill was first the East Coast Field Secretary and then moved his way up to the position of National Program Director. As National Program Director, Hill coordinated the route 40 desegregation of restaurants, the Waldorf campaign, and illustrated the civil rights demonstration that took place at the 1964 Republican National Convention.

Between 1964 and 1967, Norman Hill held the positions of Legislative Representative and Civil Rights Liaison of the Industrial Union Department of the AFL-CIO. He was involved in the issue of raising minimum wage and overseeing the labor delegation on the Selma to Montgomery marches against racial discrimination in politics and voting in the southern United States.

In 1967, Hill became active in the A. Philip Randolph Institute. He began as Associate Director, but later became Executive Director, and finally President. In 1968, while Hill was Associate Director, in response to the assassination of Martin Luther King Jr. on April 4, he coordinated and organized the Memphis March. In his career at the A. Philip Randolph Institute, Hill created over two hundred local chapters of this organization across the United States.

In 1969, Norman Hill also had a lead role in the controversial movie Burn!, starring Marlon Brando and Evaristo Marquez and directed by Gillo Pontecorvo. The movie's plot concerns a secret "agent provocateur" who arrives to manipulate a slave revolt on the fictional Portuguese colony of Queimada in the Lesser Antilles.
