= Young People's Socialist League (1907) =

Youth arm of the Socialist Party of America

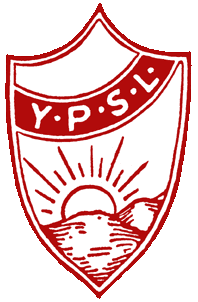
- Original logo of the Young People's Socialist League
- Chairman: Various
- Founded: May 17, 1907
- Dissolved: December 31, 1972
- Succeeded by: Young People's Socialist League
- Headquarters: Chicago, Illinois, United States
- Ideology: Social democracy Democratic socialism
- Mother party: Socialist Party of America
- International affiliation: None
- Newspaper: The Challenge of Youth

The Young People's Socialist League (YPSL), founded in 1907, was the official youth arm of the Socialist Party of America. Its political activities tend to concentrate on increasing the voter turnout of young democratic socialists and social democrats affecting the issues impacting that demographic group.

== History ==
=== Foundation and early years ===
The youth section of the Socialist Party of America (SPA) had its roots in non-coordinated groups established at the local level by party members interested in conducting special activities to attract young people to the socialist movement. These groups had diverse names, including the "Athenian Literary Society," "Young People's Alliance," and "Social Science Study Club."

The Young People's Socialist League (YPSL, pronounced "YIP-sell") was founded on May 17, 1907, in Chicago, Illinois, with the group containing about 30 members at the time of its formation. Key individuals in the formation of the group included Charles Schuler, A.W. Mance, Merle B. Haver, and Rube Burrows. Schuler remained Secretary of the organization through 1913. Participants sought their own headquarters and held a series of money-raising entertainments and social events to that end, successful enough for the group in November 1907 to open an office in the building of the Chicago Daily Socialist.

Simultaneously in New York City, several already existing socialist youth groups united themselves in 1907 to form a "Young People's Socialist Federation." In connection with this growing New York socialist youth movement, in 1908 the publishing association responsible for producing the New Yorker Volkszeitung began to issue The Little Socialist Magazine for Boys and Girls — a publication which was renamed The Young Socialists' Magazine in June 1911 and which eventually became the official organ of the national YPSL movement.

The 1912 National Convention of the Socialist Party took note of a need to better coordinate the Socialist youth movement, placing it under the Women's Department of the National Office. This move proved to be merely cosmetic and there was still no national organization binding the numerous largely autonomous local organizations together until 1913. It was at this time the SPA's national committee was pushed into action by the efforts of the party's California State Secretary, a vociferous supporter of the socialist youth movement. While there remained support among some for the formation of a semi-autonomous organization which elected its own national secretary and executive committee, in the end the national committee of the SPA decided to form a "Young People's Department," directly attached and fully subordinate to the National Office of the adult SPA. Formal establishment of the YPSL as the official youth section of the Socialist Party began at this date.

By February 1914 the YPSL reported a membership total of 4,800, split into 112 circles. An additional 18 circles were in the process of being organized at that time. Members were kept abreast of developments of the organization in the pages of a monthly journal, The Young Socialists' Magazine, with a circulation of 10,000.

=== World War I and the Independent YPSL ===
In 1915 a unified national YPSL was formally launched when various local Circles adopted a constitution by a referendum vote. Two years later, YPSL National Secretary William "Bill" Kruse reported the group had a membership of about 5,000, spread in Circles in 147 cities.

With the American entry into World War I, National Secretary Kruse was one of five top leaders of the SPA targeted for prosecution by the United States Department of Justice. Kruse was hauled into court, tried, and sentenced to 20 years in prison for violation of the wartime "Espionage Act". The sentence was finally overturned on appeal on grounds of judicial prejudice in 1920.

In 1919, the faction known as the Left Wing Section of the Socialist Party exited the SPA to form two organizations which would eventually unite as the Communist Party USA. The YPSL, headed by Left Wing supporter Oliver Carlson and generally sympathetic to the perspective of the Left Wing, initially attempted to chart an independent course from the Socialist Party and the nascent Communist Labor Party of America and Communist Party of America. Without financial support from the SPA, however, the so-called Independent Young People's Socialist League essentially disintegrated, with many of the active leaders in the group enlisting in the underground communist movement, while others drifted away from political activity altogether.

=== 1921 reorganization ===
The Socialist Party reorganized the YPSL with Bill Kruse reelected as its secretary, but he, too, departed the Socialist Party for the Communist movement in 1921. The league was once again relaunched at a 1922 convention, with Albert Weisbord as national secretary. Weisbord managed to rebuild a network of YPSL Circles but in 1924 he joined Carlson and Kruse in the ranks of the Workers Party of America, "legal" successor to the underground communist movement.

The YPSL organization survived the defection of its third leader and were active in the Socialist Party-endorsed campaign of Robert M. La Follette for President of the United States in 1924. An attempt was made to start a new official publication for the organization called Free Youth, but the effort failed due to lack of funds, with the membership of the Socialist Party down to about 10% of where it stood five years previously. With the rest of the Socialist Party, the YPSL entered five years of decline and malaise following the unsatisfying outcome of the 1924 campaign.

=== Growth in the early 1930s ===
YPSL pinback from the 1930s, featuring the Socialist Party's traditional hand-and-torch logo.

The Great Depression beginning in 1929, combined with a new and energetic Socialist Party leadership around 1928 Presidential Candidate Norman Thomas and party Executive Secretary Clarence Senior lead to a revitalization of the Socialist Party's youth wing, as the YPSL grew along with the adult party. According to National Secretary Emanuel Switkes, at the end of 1930 the national YPSL organization had about 1500 members, divided into 65 branches in 25 cities of 9 states.

The for a time the YPSL was subdivided into two divisions, a "junior" group including boys and girls from the ages 13 to 16 and a "senior" group of young women and men aged 16 to 30. The organization raised funds and collected clothing for strikes in Danville, Virginia and Ward, West Virginia, and assisted in picketing on behalf of the International Ladies' Garment Workers' Union, the Amalgamated Clothing Workers Union, the Furriers Union, the Retail Clerks Union, and others. The group also held a jamboree in Reading, Pennsylvania, the national headquarters of the YPSL organization.

The official organ of the YPSL during the depression decade was a monthly tabloid newspaper launched in April 1933 initially called The Challenge, the name later being changed to The Challenge of Youth. The YPSL also produced a theoretical magazine and discussion bulletin called Young Socialist Review, which was available for 10 cents a copy. The magazine seems to have appeared irregularly. National chairman of the YPSL in 1935 was Arthur G. McDowell and national secretary was Winston Dancis.

==== Red Falcons ====
In 1933 the party established a children's organization known as the Red Falcons of America, targeted at children who might otherwise be swept up by the Boy Scouts (perceived to be a quasi-military training organization) or the Sunday schools (believed to be aimed at fostering passivity and fatalism through inculcation of religious dogma). Boys and girls between the ages of 8 and 15 were eligible for membership in the group, of which it was said that it "trains them for service in the class struggle and membership in the Young People's Socialist League."

Yipsel Circles were called up on to "make Falcon work a part of their regular activity" and volunteers from the YPSL ranks were sought to serve as leaders and advisors of the new Junior youth organization. The group seems to have been started on YPSL initiative as the initial report of the group in the YPSL's official newspaper indicated that "the Yipsel National Executive will take up with the National Office of the Socialist Party and sympathetic labor organizations the matter of aid to the [Red Falcon] movement."

Red Falcon headquarters was located at the Rand School of Social Science, located at 7 East 15th Street in New York City. There organization published its own monthly magazine, The Falcon Call, for its members, with the first issue having come off the press in January 1933. Activities of one branch of the group included early morning distribution of trade union leaflets at a non-union handkerchief factory and visits to a New York museum "to see visual portrayal of the story of evolution."

The Red Falcons were accorded independent status and a full-time national office at Socialist Party headquarters late in 1935, when National Secretary Clarence Senior preemptively acceded to the group's demand for the same, staving off a planned "March on Chicago." Sam Schwimer, editor of The Falcon Call, was chosen as the national secretary of the group.

The Red Falcons held a "Guides' Convention" in association with the July 1936 national convention of the Socialist Party in Cleveland, with Secretary Elizabeth Most stepping down from her position. Harry Fleischman was named by National Secretary Senior as the new head of the children's group, which claimed an organized membership of "approximately 2500."

=== Socialist Vanguard ===
Influenced no doubt by the so-called "shirts movement" of Europe, in which party youth and adult organizations of the political right and left identified themselves with common uniforms, in 1933 the New York Young People's Socialist League launched a new sub-organization called the "Socialist Vanguard." This group was organized into "squads" of 8 members each, about 40 of which were established at the time of the group's launch. The Socialist Vanguard was marked by royal blue shirts with a red logo, the emblem being a circle with three arrows, as used by the by then annihilated Iron Front in Germany.

The group's debut came at a "ratification meeting" held September 24, 1933 in New York City — a mass meeting attended by nearly 2,000 people, according to a Socialist Party account. The gathering was addressed by party leader and perennial Presidential nominee Norman Thomas as well as Mayoral candidate Charles Solomon. Jack Altman, a veteran of the YPSL, was chosen as leader of the new body, with three others selected as boro heads for Manhattan, Brooklyn, and Queens.

==== YPSL membership data ====
At the time of the 7th national convention of the YPSL, held in Reading, Pennsylvania in August 1933, National Secretary Win Dancis reported a membership of approximately 4,000 for the organization, divided among 204 chartered local circles.

The 8th national convention of the YPSL, held in 1935, raised the group's maximum membership age from 25 to 30, a decision ratified by vote of the membership.

In addition to their direct efforts in financial assistance and picketing of labor actions, the YPSL also conducted educational and propaganda activities among its members as well as providing an opportunity for like minded young people to participate in athletics, dramatic performances, and other social activities. Local branches sometimes produced their own publications, such as the monthlies The Socialist (Boston), Free Youth (New York), as well as less professional mimeographed bulletins in Chicago, Cleveland, Los Angeles, and Syracuse, New York.

1936 saw the YPSL's membership in the range between 2,000 and 6,000 members, as compared to the Young Communist League, which had around 11,000 members at that time. The Socialist youth organization continued to experience minimal growth, while the YCL exploded to around 22,000 members by 1939, making it far and away the leading left youth organization in the country. During the 1930s the youth party emphasized on the working class and non-college youth, despite the fact that the leadership group were mostly college graduate". The YPSL organ, the Young Socialist Review, deemphasized college work, and instead targeting work on organizing at the High School level. While, YPSL was periodically active in collegiate affairs, this effort was often conducted by members who were connected with other left youth organizations, such as the Student League for Industrial Democracy.

=== Decline in the late 1930s ===
A bitter struggle between the rivaling factions appeared during the late 1930s within the mother party, between the revolutionary socialist "Militants" and an electorally-oriented "Old Guard." Young, energetic, and brash, the YPSL branches seem to have almost universally been drawn to the Militant faction, bringing some branches into conflict with the Locals of the adult party with which they were nominally associated. The New York YPSL found themselves locked out of their office and blackballed from membership in the adult party by the Old Guard-dominated New York State Committee in early 1935 when they refused to support the weekly newspaper of the Old Guard, The New Leader. A complaint was filed and the matter was brought before the national executive committee for judgment at its March 23–24, 1935, session held in Buffalo, New York. The NEC instructed the New York State Committee to adhere to the national constitution of the SPA, which called for the admission of YPSL members of 2 years good standing. Six weeks were given for compliance.

In 1936, an influx of Trotskyist members into the adult tilted the YPSL's ideological direction to the left, with National Secretary Ernest Erber particularly supportive of the new radical trend. Several hundred members of the Trotskyist Spartacus Youth League joined the YPSL as part of a mass entry into the Socialist Party known among the Trotskyists as the "French Turn." The Trotskyists were expelled en masse in 1937, but many young activists exited the YPSL with them during the acrimonious split.

In 1936, the party turned its attention towards campus, creating the National Student Committee (NSC). The organization never drew many members, many speculating because of its ties with the Socialist Party of America or because of YPSL's factionalism. The only strength YPSL had with the campus movement, was through more sophisticated members who had earned high ranks within other student organizations, such as the American Youth Congress (AYC) and the American Student Union (ASU). With the ever-growing YCL, YPSL help founding the Youth Committee Against War (YCAW), which became an organization in which YPSL members voiced their politics about the peace movement. While ultimately did not lead to much more support, which would have been seen as one of socialisms biggest failures in the United States, to not be able to gain popular support from young workers and college students, losing many left-leaning supporters to the Communists.

When Nazi Germany started World War II, the SPA firmly said that they did not want the United States to participate in the war. The relationships between YPSL and YCL was hurt by this, being that YCL wanted to join the war. The YCL drew strength from both liberals and socialist alike, many supporters were convinced that Europe needed help to defeat the fascist state of Nazi Germany. Despite socialist opposition, both AYC and ASU both supported YCL in its foreign policies regarding the fascist regime of Nazi Germany. By the end of the 1939, YCL used much its time attacking YPSL.

=== The Cold War era ===
By 1952, the Socialist Party's YPSL had 134 members, 62 of which had been recruited that year. The Independent Socialist League (ISL) affiliated Socialist Youth League (SYL) had been making overtures to YPSL. The mother party, Socialist Party of America, told YPSL it could not have contact with the "totalitarian" organizations of SYL or ISL, although YPSL ignored this, and the relationship between YPSL and its mother party worsened. In 1953, the Socialist Party cut off money to YPSL, and then suspended YPSL's New York branch, which was the one with the most contact with SYL (and the ISL). In August, the party including the "suspended" members voted to disaffiliate with its mother party. In February 1954, the Young People's Socialist League merged with SYL to form the Young Socialist League.

The party revived YPSL after the split but by 1958. By that time the Socialist Party had merged with the Social Democratic Federation and had become the Socialist Party-Social Democratic Federation. This was part of a strategy favored by David McReynolds and others to merge all the democratic socialist groups into one organization. Max Shachtman of the ISL was receptive to this idea and, after much controversy, the ISL agreed to disband, turn over its assets to the SP-SDF and its members joined the individually. The YSL mergerd with the YPSL organizationally at a convention in August 1958.

=== YPSL in the 1960s ===
The YPSL grew quickly in the early 1960s, from 300 members in 1960 to over 800 in 1962. Two of its important leaders were Tom Kahn and Rachelle Horowitz, two students who had joined the YSL at Brooklyn College in the mid-1950s. They had helped organize several important civil rights demonstrations with the aid of Bayard Rustin, including the 1957 Prayer Pilgrimage to Washington and the 1958 and 1959 Youth March for Integrated Schools. In 1960 YPSL members played important roles organizing pickets at local Woolworths in support of the Southern sit-ins and protesting the arrival of the HUAC to the San Francisco Bay area.

Within the SP-SDF and the YPSL, Max Shachtman's group was known as the "realignment tendency" because Shachtman increasingly felt that it was better for the Socialists to create a realignment within the Democratic Party consisting of the AFL-CIO, African Americans and liberals. It was also anti-communist. When Shachtman made a speech supporting the Bay of Pigs Invasion in April 1961 to the Berkeley chapter of the Socialist Party, the local YPSL chapter withdrew his invitation to speak the following day. Domestically they were against working with Stalinists. Besides the "realignment tendency", YPSL contained more traditional "third camp" socialists, which maintained the politics that Shachtman had formulated in the late 1940s. This was called the "labor party tendency" because they favored a labor party on the British model, rather than a strategy of reforming the Democratic Party as a socialist party.

During this period the YPSL worked within other groups, such as the Student Peace Union and the Students for a Democratic Society, but their internal factionalism got in the way. Mike Parker, a yipsel of the labor party faction, had become the group's national secretary in 1960, and other yipsels poured into the SPU, where they also recruited new members. This helped to give the SPU's ideology a "Third Camp" orientation that held both the west and the USSR responsible for nuclear proliferation. Its most popular slogan was "No Test! East or West!". However, the SPU was a base for the labor-party faction within the YPSL and the realignment tendency sought to having it merge with Student SANE to dilute their influence. This idea was defeated by Parker, but the intense YPSL factionalism within the SPU continued until the group disbanded in spring 1964.

YPSL was hostile to the new SDS "activist" approach in 1960; they were wary that it would become another "protest group" and compete with them within the civil rights movement. They were briefly successful in getting Al Haber removed as field secretary in March 1961, but he was quickly rehired after threatening to form another youth group. In May 1961 the YPSL tried to get the SDS to affiliate with a number of independent groups in which it was active, such as the Politics Club at the University of Chicago as chapters, but were rebuffed. The SDS gradually took a more radical line than its parent organization, the League for Industrial Democracy, which was controlled by the realignment caucus. It recruited among "red diaper babies" and criticized the "'paranoic' use of terms like 'stalinoid' and 'stalinist'.

The dispute came to a head at the SDSs June 1962 convention at Port Huron, Michigan. The YPSL representative, Michael Harrington, objected to seating an observer from the Communist Party. Harrington was also upset with the manifesto adopted by the convention, the Port Huron Statement, for its criticism of American labor unions and for its criticism of liberal and socialist opposition to communism. He was able to get some concessions, but when he got back to New York he got a call from a yipsel saying that the changes had been thrown out. Harrington alerted the LID executive board who promptly changed the locks on the SDS doors, fired Al Haber (again) and summoned the SDS leaders for a stiff "talking to". After reading the statement, the LID board found that the changes Harrington had favored had been included in the final document; after some financial backers came to SDS's defense, the locks were removed from their office and Haber was reinstated. The incident left a negative impression on the SDS leaders toward democratic socialists and liberals.

By 1964 the SP-SDF was becoming increasingly under the control of the realignment tendency, while the YPSL was becoming more radicalized, and tended more toward Trotskyism. At its national convention in August 1964 the YPSL elected a leadership particularly hostile to the party, passed resolutions moving the YPSL's headquarters to Chicago without consulting the party, deleted all references to the party in its constitution and initiated a referendum on seceding from the parent organization. The National Action Committee of the Socialist Party suspended the YPSL on September 8, pending a meeting of the full national committee. The national committee met on November 28–29 and passed two resolutions, one lifting the suspension if the YPSL would agree to continue in its constitutional role as the party's youth section, and another empowering it to appoint a special youth committee to co-ordinate the activities of loyal yipsels and chapters should the YPSL leadership not comply with the first resolution. Following this, the YPSL national executive committee voted to dissolve the organization; the party followed through with its pledge and appointed a "caretaker" committee until a new convention could be held. When the YPSL was reconstituted its leaders and staff were mainly associates of Max Schachtman. Most of the "labor party" adherents found their way into Hal Draper's Independent Socialist Clubs.

=== Legacy ===
A number of the YPSL members from the 1960s and early 1970s became notable figures, including United States Senator Bernie Sanders, Carl Gershman of the National Endowment for Democracy, Joshua Muravchik of the American Enterprise Institute and Max Green, the author of Epitaph for American Labor: Radicalism in the Union Movement (1996). Gershman, Muravchik and Green were the vice chairman, national chairman and national secretary of the organization in 1971.

== Conventions ==
=== First national convention ===
According to YPSL first national convention from May 1–4, 1919, the committee was supposed to consist of all state secretaries of the YPSL organized state parties. Other members could only by elected into the committee by a referendum vote. All unorganized state organization included in the YPSL was entitled to a national committeeman, if the state organization consisted a membership of over 100 members. The election of a committeeman was to be supervised of a national secretary of the organization. Members who sought a position in the national committee or any subcommittees needed a one year's consecutive membership.

A national secretary was nominated by the various state Leagues. Voting was by a referendum of the membership conducted by the standing national secretary of the league. The national secretary had a term of two years, taking office in July and was ineligible to stand for re-election after having served two-consecutive terms.

=== 1932 national convention ===
The 1932 national convention decided to launch a new official newspaper for the YPSL, a monthly which was born the following spring as The Challenge.

=== 7th national convention ===
The 7th national convention of the YPSL was held in Reading, Pennsylvania, on the weekend of August 26–27, 1933. A total of 147 delegates were seated, representing 100 Circles in 37 cities from 14 states and one Canadian province. According to official organizational reports, the YPSL counted 204 constituent Circles with a total membership of "around 4,000."

The convention authorized the establishment of regular Educational and Student departments in addition to the Industrial Department first established at the convention of 1932. Winston Dancis was unanimously elected national secretary, Arthur G. McDowell was elected national chairman, succeeding the retiring Julius Umansky, and a new NEC was chosen, including Dancis, McDowell, Austin Adams (Reading, PA), John Domurad (Holyoke, MA), Aaron Levenstein (New York City), Robert Parker (Cleveland), Paul A. Rasmussen (Illinois), John Stroebel (Milwaukee), Noah C.A. Walter, Jr. (New York City), and Milton Weisberg (Pittsburgh). William Gomberg was elected national student secretary, Gus Tyler educational secretary, and Arthur McDowell reelected as industrial secretary.

The case of former national secretary Smerkin was heard by the convention. The decision of the NEC to recall Smerkin and reorganize the Chicago Circle because of their "disruptive" campaign "under Communist Party influence to divide YPSL ranks and disrupt the organization" was ratified by a vote of 110 to 9.

=== 8th national convention ===
The 8th national convention of the YPSL was held from July 19 to 21, 1935, in Pittsburgh, Pennsylvania.

== National secretaries ==
- William F. "Bill" Kruse (1915–1919)
- Oliver Carlson (1919–1921)
- Albert Weisbord (1922–1924)
- Emanuel Switkes
- George Smerkin (c. May 1933) —removed by YPSL NEC for participation in unsanctioned political activities.
- Winston "Win" Dancis (May 1933 – 1935?)
- Ben Fischer (socialist) (c. 1935)
- Ernest Erber (1936-Aug. 1937)
- Al Hamilton (Sept. 1937-?)

== Official publications ==
- Young Socialists' Magazine
- Free Youth (New York) (February 15, 1931 – November 1, 1931) —semi-monthly, 18 issues produced.
- The Challenge/Challenge of Youth (Chicago and New York) (March 1933 – September 1946) —Briefly relaunched as Arise from November 1937 following the split of the Trotskyist faction.

== See also ==
- Socialist Sunday Schools
