= Challenge (1933) =

Challenge was a tabloid-sized monthly newspaper established in Chicago in April 1933 that served as the official organ of the Young People's Socialist League, the youth section of the Socialist Party of America. The publication was subsequently renamed The Challenge of Youth and continued in existence through 1946.

== Publication history ==
=== Establishment ===
The decision to launch a new official newspaper of the Young People's Socialist League (YPSL) was made at the 1932 National Convention of the YPSL. In April 1933, this publication was launched, a 4-page tabloid called The Challenge. Throughout its first year, the publication campaigned against the threat of international war, fascism, child labor, and deficiencies in the American education system and lobbied on behalf of efforts to politically organize unemployed workers and to expand the trade union movement.

The first issue of The Challenge featured a lengthy masthead, including Arthur G. McDowell as Editor, James Quick, Bob Parker, Jack Jaffe, Aaron Levenstein, and Paul Rasmussen as Associate Editors, Hy Fish as Business Manager, and a Socialist Party list including Norman Thomas, Powers Hapgood, Upton Sinclair, and Oscar Ameringer as "Contributing Editors."

Editor Syd Devin later quit in order to finish his studies. Devin was replaced by Melos Most, who had previously been a delegate to the executive committee meeting of the Socialist Youth International, held in Belgium in 1934. Most was later named as editor of the youth page of the New York weekly The Socialist Call.

=== First hiatus ===
After shutting down for the summer of 1936, The Challenge of Youth returned in September. It was issued very irregularly, however, with an apologetic notice printed in the 4-page February 1937 issue noting that "the reason for it not appearing has been financial." It was noted that the newspaper received no publication subsidy from the Socialist Party, with all its costs borne by the YPSL organization, which was holding evening festivities in Chicago in an effort to raise funds to insure the publication's survival. Ernest Erber, National Secretary of the YPSL, had taken sole charge of the editorial task.

== List of issue dates and key contents ==
All articles unsigned unless otherwise noted.

The Challenge

Editor: Arthur G. McDowell. Associate Editors: James Quick, Bob Parker, Jack Jaffe, Aaron Levenstein, Paul Rasmussen. Business Manager: Hy Fish. Editorial Office: 549 Randolph Street, Chicago, Illinois.

- Vol. 1, No. 1 — April 1933

"US Army Plan Exposed: War Department Ready to Move Against Unemployed When Relief Breaks Down"; "Germany, A Lesson in Politics" (editorial); "The Decline of American Trade Unionism," by Andrew Biemiller; "Thugs Battle With Striking Miners" (Illinois); "Defeat Militarization of Unemployed Youth; Labor Camps Menace."

Editor: Arthur G. McDowell. Associate Editors: James Quick, Bob Parker, Jack Jaffe, Aaron Levenstein. Business Manager: Hy Fish. Editorial Office: 549 Randolph Street, Chicago, Illinois.

- Vol. 1, No. 2 — May 1933

"Youth Meet at Congress" (Continental Congress on Reconstruction); "Red Briefs for Reds, Says Socialist Lawyer" (Darlington Hoopes bio); "Takes Action on Chicago Situation: Statement on Disciplining of Chicago City YPSL"; "Youth Platform of Young People's Socialist League of America, Proclaimed on May Day of 1933"; "Yipsels Act in Chicago School Strikes"; "Young Socialist Groups Participate in Athletics."

- Vol. 1, No. 3 — June 1933

"Youth Spreads Strikes"; "Yipsels Help Unions Fight Sweatshops"; "YPSL Acts in Anti-Military Fight: Picket World War Picture in Bridgeport"; "Hapgood, Harvard Graduate, Forsakes Eliot's Advice" (Powers Hapgood bio); "Pick Reading for Site of Seventh Annual Convention"; "New York Yipsels Aid Bakery Strike"; "Abolish Child Labor Forevermore" (YPSL declaration).

- Vol. 1, No. 4 — July 1933

"Abolish Child Labor Forevermore," declaration of the YPSL of A; "Needle Trades Choose Krzycki"; Leo Kryzycki biography; "Cleveland Young Socialists Organize Press Punch Operators Out on Strike"; "Yipsels Help to Organize Labor Bloc" (ACWU).

- Vol. 1, No. 5 — August–September 1933

"Reading Strikes Make History"; "Yipsels Aid New Strikes in St. Louis"; "Dixie Strike Leader Jailed," by Norman Thomas; "Veteran Sarah Limbach Remains Vigilant Fighter on Labor's Battle Front" (Sarah Z. Limbach bio); "YPSL Convention, Reading, Aug. 26-27: Gathering to Make Plans for Future," by Winston "Win" Dancis; "Chicago General School Strike Looms".

Editor: Arthur G. McDowell. Associate Editors: James Quick, Bob Parker, Ben Fischer, Aaron Levenstein. Editorial Office: 549 Randolph Street, Chicago, Illinois.

- Vol. 1, No. 6 — October 1933

"Labor Revolt Sweeps America"; "Defend the Free Public Schools"; "Young Socialist Meet Shows Unity: Upholds vote of NEC on Chicago YPSL"; "New York Yipsels Organize Vanguard; Acts as Colorful Unit in Mass Action: blue Shirts and Red Emblems Worn by Young Socialists"; "Socialist Youth International Fights War".

- Vol. 1, No. 7 — November 1933

"NIRA Fails Youth and Farmer"; Open Letter to Bernarr Macfadden; "No Hope for Young Worker in 'New Deal'"; "YPSL Conducts Anti-Militarism Demonstration"; "Salute!" (Morris Hillquit Obituary); "Roosevelt! The Genial Jingo"; "Owners Dig in to Resist Control: NRA Strike Breaking is Boss' Hope" (Federated Press); "Anti-Fascist Student Unite to Organize" (Student League Against Fascism).

Editor: Arthur G. McDowell. Associate Editors: James Quick, Bob Parker, Ben Fischer, Aaron Levenstein. Business Manager: Sid Devin. Editorial Office: 549 Randolph Street, Chicago, Illinois.

- Vol. 1, No. 8 — December 1933

"Nazi Propaganda Poisons US"; "Expose Civilian Conservation Corps as Military Unit: Train Youth for Future Mass Killing"; "Trace History of Labor and Socialism in US" (Historical sketch part 1, 1872-1900); "Yipsels! Help Build the Young Falcon Movement"; "Federated Press Correspondent Bids Farewell in US Labor History Article," by Laurence Todd.

- Vol. 1, No. 9 — January 1934

"War Makers See Their Hopes in CCC: Assistant War Secretary Aspires to Enrollment of Million by Next Summer"; "Hoopes Defeats Reactionaries"; "YPSL National Committee Maps Campaign for 1934"; "Trace Growth of Socialist Movement in United States" (Historical sketch part 1, 1901-1918); "New Primer of Socialism (part 1)" by Ben Horowitz.

- Vol. 1, No. 10 — February 1934

"Student Revolt Against Militarism Growing"; "Seven Ohio State Expulsions Call for New Protest" (refusal to participate in military drill; "To War or Not," by Henry Margulies; "Trace Growth of Socialist Movement in US Since War" (Historical sketch part 3, 1919-date); "New Primer of Socialism (part 2)" by Ben Horowitz; "German Boycott by Workers" (editorial); "St. Louis Yipsels Builds Youth's Antiwar Front".

- Vol. 1, No. 11 — March 1934

No copy available for review. "New Primer of Socialism (part 3)" by Ben Horowitz.

Editor: Arthur G. McDowell. Associate Editors: James Quick, Ben Fischer, Aaron Levenstein. Business Manager: Sid Devin. Editorial Office: 549 Randolph Street, Chicago, Illinois.

- Vol. 2, No. 1 — April 1934

"Students in the War Against War and War Makers"; "College Armories and Forest Camp New Youth Traps"; "Youth Can End War: A Message to the Bravest of American Youth" (manifesto of NEC of YPSL of A); "Labor Revolt Grows Despite Auto Retreat"; "New Primer of Socialism (part 4)" by Ben Horowitz; "Announce Jamboree and Camp Plans for the Summer of 1934".

- Vol. 2, No. 2 — May 1934

"Organize Youth Against Fascism: May Day Manifesto Announces New Anti-Fascist Youth Group"; "Soviet Leningrad and Nazi Hamburg: A Study in Contrasts," by Lenora Greory (New Clarion reprint); "Young Socialist National Committee Maps New Work"; "Soviet Russia 1934" (editorial); "May Day Finds Austrian Socialists Fighting On"; "Free Press Outcry Veils Child Labor Evil: Newspaper Code's child Labor Clause OKs Crime School," by S.L. Devin.

The Challenge of Youth

Managing editor: Melos Most. Editorial Office: 549 Randolph Street, Chicago, Illinois.

- Vol. 3, No. 7 — October 1935

"Britain, Italy Near War"; "Desertions from Anti-War Ranks Begin"; "Drive Against Hearst Films Planned"; "War Dange May Cause Union of Student Groups (Student League for Industrial Democracy and National Student League); "The Rise of an American Student Union," by Al Hamilton; "Terror in Terre Haute," by Powers Hapgood; "Do You Believe in Violent Revolution?" by Maynard Krueger; "The Russian Revolution Lives On," by Ernest Erber; "The Story of a Revolution" (Spain, part 1), by Melos Most; "Thomas Supports War Stand" (letter), by Norman Thomas.

- Vol. 3, No. 8 — November 1935

"World War in 60 Days"; "Young Socialists Move to 'Drive Hearst from Movies'"; "Sports Internationals in United Front Pact"; "Text of Socialist Party's War Resolution"; "NEC Discusses War Question, YPSL Headway"; "Youth Gets a Handout" (forthcoming pamphlet), by Larry Brown; "William Randolph Hearst," by Labor Research Front; "Behind Mussolini's War Venture," by Vincezo Vacirca; "Two Ways to Defend the Soviet Union," by Harold Draper; "The Story of a Revolution" (Spain, part 2), by Melos Most.

- Vol. 3, No. 9 — December 1935

"Students Vote on Union" (SLID/NSL); "300,000 Students in War Resistance 'Mobilization,'" by George Edwards; "YCL to Go Under Knife: Communist Youth International to Be Dissolved, League Depoliticized..."; "Red Falcolns 'March on Chi,' Get National Office"; "The National Youth Administration is a Danger!"; "What We Want of a Student Union"; "The Story of a Revolution" (Spain, part 3), by Melos Most; "Where We Stand" (includes Browder-Thomas Debate).

- Vol. 3, No. 10 — January 1936

No copy available for review.

Responsible Editorial Board: Ernest Erber, Ben Fischer, Hy Fish. Managing Editor: Melos Most. Editorial Office: 549 Randolph Street, Chicago, Illinois.

- Vol. 3, No. 11 — February–March 1936

"American Youth Act Up Before Congress"; "Expect 350,000 to Strike" (April 22, 1936 action); "Socialism, Communism Debated by US Youth," articles by Leon Zitver and Florence Haikin; "Impressions of the American Class Struggle," by Maxine Miller; "An Explanation of the Dictatorship of the Proletariat," by Morris Hillquit; "The German Socialist Youth," by Karl Liebknecht; "The American Student Union," by Al Hamilton.

- Vol. 4, No. 1 — April 1936

"Youth Act Hearing Held"; "Socialist Revolution Due Soon in Spain; Masses are Restless," by Melos Most; "The Revolutionary Position and the Immediate Problems of War," by Gus Tyler; "The Early 'Challenge'"; "The Challenge Today," by E. Ewald; "Beyond the AYA," by Ben Fischer; "Schools Empty April 22," by Eleanora Deren; "Students Protest Loyalty Oath Bill"; "High Hopes Confirmed by Growth" (American Student Union), by Joseph P. Lash; "Jim Crow in US Education," by Lyonel Florant.

- Vol. 4, No. 2 — May–June 1936

No copy available for review.

- Vol. 4, No. 3 — July 1936

"Thomas, Nelson to Run on Platform Endorsing Youth-Help Act"; "3,000 Meet at Youth Congress" (3rd American Youth Congress); "Christian Youth Throw Vote to Socialist Party"; "Build the American Youth Congress!" by Harry Fleischman; "Convention Address of Ernest Erber"; "Organize the Unemployed Union," by Milton Arons.

Responsible Editorial Board: Ernest Erber, Ben Fischer. Managing Editor: Melos Most. Editorial Office: 549 Randolph Street, Chicago, Illinois.

- Vol. 4, No. 4 — "Late September" 1936

"See Record Vote for Socialists"; "US Socialist Youth Leader Sent to Spain" (Erber); "American Youth Congress Upset Brings Bureau Behind Socialist Stand for Unity"; "Red Youth Battle Fascism" (Spain); "What Happened at the Third American Youth Congress?" by Ben Fischer; "Our Schools Go On Closing," by Harry Shields; "The Soviet Trial: An Editorial Statement" (Zinoviev).

Editor: Ernest Erber. Editorial Office: 549 Randolph Street, Chicago, Illinois.

- Vol. 5, No. 1 — "Late February" 1937

"Debs Column Fighters Sail to Fight Fascists"; "Appeal to Workers Only Hope in Spain," by Ernest Erber; "New Berne Necessary to Unite Youth Against Imperialist War," by Ben Fischer; "Challenge Notes"; "The Party Convention" (editorial); "Communist Hooliganism" (editorial); "Pacifism" (letter to the Editor), by Al Hamilton.

== See also ==
- Young People's Socialist League (1907)
- Socialist Party of America
