= Youth March for Integrated Schools =

Youth March for Integrated Schools may refer to:

- Youth March for Integrated Schools (1958)
- Youth March for Integrated Schools (1959)
