= James Rorty =

American writer and poet (1890–1973)

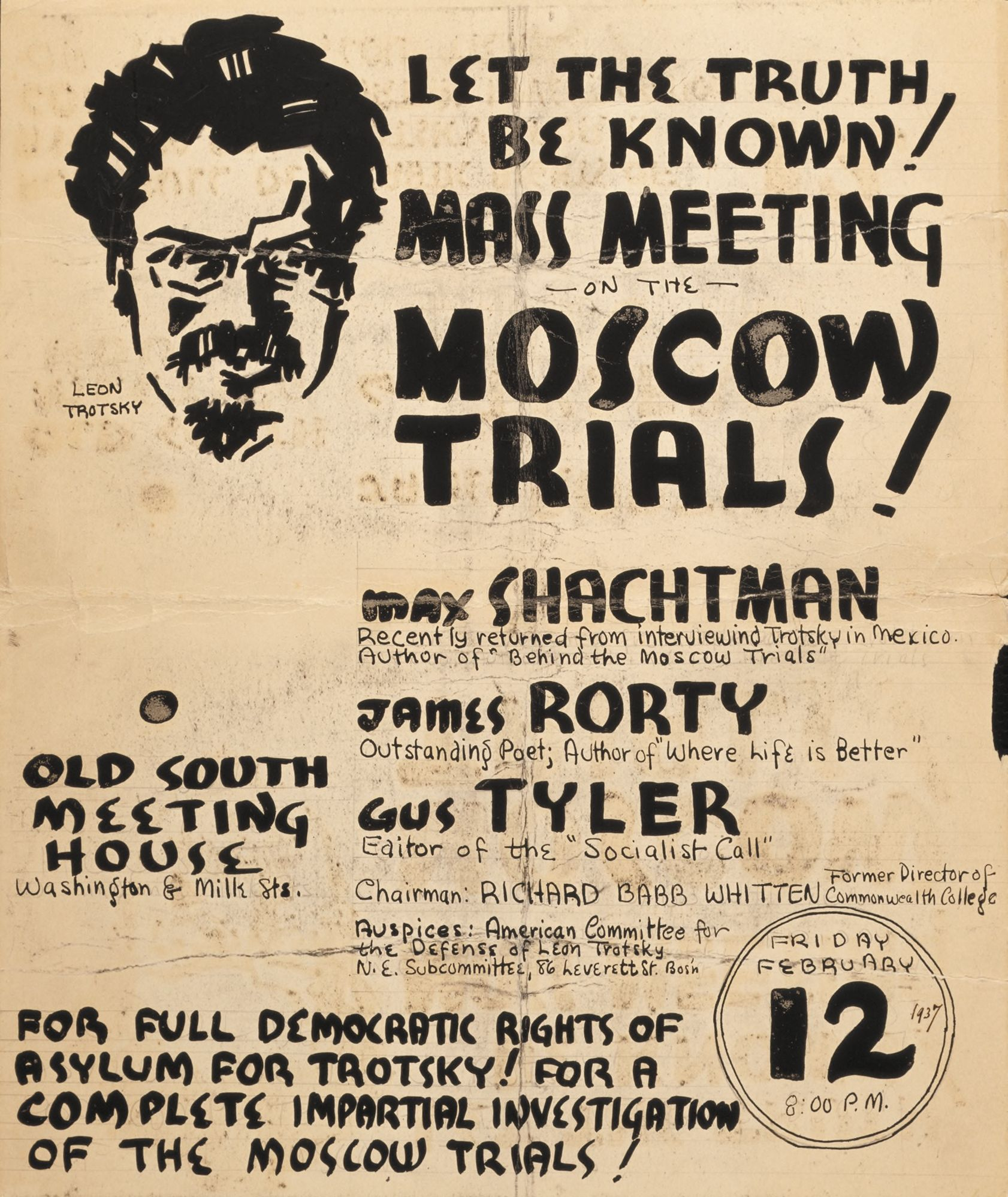
A poster advertising a mass meeting of the American Committee for the Defense of Leon Trotsky at the Old South Meeting House in Boston, Massachusetts, featuring Max Shachtman, James Rorty and Gus Tyler, c. 1937

James Rorty (March 30, 1890 – February 26, 1973) was a 20th-century American radical writer and poet as well as political activist who addressed controversial topics that included McCarthyism, Jim Crow, American industries, advertising, and nutrition, and was perhaps best known as a founding editor of the New Masses magazine.

== Background ==
James Hancock Rorty was born March 30, 1890, in Middletown, New York. His parents were Irish immigrants Octavia Churchill and Richard McKay Rorty. His father was a political refugee with Fenian and anarchist affiliations from County Donegal, Ireland. In 1913, he earned a BA from Tufts College. He pursued graduate studies at New York University and The New School for Social Research.

== Career ==
In 1913, he began his career with work in the advertising industry. He also worked in settlement houses.

During World War I, Rorty served as a stretcher bearer on the Argonne front, an experience that led him to become a "militant pacifist."

Rorty worked as a journalist and poet for more than sixty years. He considered himself "the last of the muckrakers," as a combatant against social injustice in America.

During World War I, Rorty moved to San Francisco to continue his career in advertising and to write experimental poetry.

In 1925, Rorty moved to New York City, where he was a founding editor (with Michael Gold, Joseph Freeman, Hugo Gellert, John Sloan, and others) of the New Masses, a Communist literary magazine, which launched the following year. However, Rorty left that next year when fellow editors rejected his publication of Robinson Jeffers's poem "Apology for Bad Dreams."

In 1927, Rorty was one of many arrested during protests against the execution of Sacco and Vanzetti.

To earn money, he also worked as an editor, journalist, advertising copy writer, and consultant for the Tennessee Valley Authority.

In 1932, he supported and then quit the campaign to support William Z. Foster (CPUSA) for U.S. president.

== Personal life and death ==
Around 1919, Rorty married Maria Ward Lambin; they were divorced in 1928. The same year, he married writer Winifred Rauschenbush (daughter of Christian socialist Walter Rauschenbusch); they had one son, philosopher Richard Rorty.

He suffered from depression.

Rorty died at age 82 on February 26, 1973, in Sarasota, Florida.

== Awards ==
- c. 1918: Distinguished Service Cross
- 1923: The Nation prize for poetry ("When We Dead Awaken")

== Works ==
In the mid-1950s, Rorty co-authored with Moshe Decter a book attacking McCarthyism called McCarthy and the Communists, supported by the American Committee for Cultural Freedom.

His books include:

- What Michael said to the census-taker (1922)
- The Intruders (1923)
- Where Life is Better: An Unsentimental American Journey (1923/1936/2014/2015)
- Children of the sun, and other poems (New York: Macmillan, 1926)
- End of Farce (1933)
- Order on the air! (New York: John Day Company, ca. 1934)
- Our Master's Voice: Advertising (New York: John Day Company, ca. 1934/1976)
- Where life is better : an unsentimental American journey (New York: Reynal & Hitchcock, c1936)
- American medicine mobilizes (New York, W.W. Norton, ca. 1939)
- Brother Jim Crow (New York: Post War World Council, 1943)
- Tomorrow's food; the coming revolution in nutrition N. Philip Norman MD (New York, Prentice Hall, 1947/1956)
- Tennessee Valley Authority: Soil ... people and fertilizer technology (Washington: US GPO, 1949)
- Engineers of world plenty (Washington, Public Affairs Institute, 1950)
- McCarthy and the Communists with Moshe Decter (Boston : Beacon Press, 1954/1972)
- We Open the Gates: Labor's Fight for Equality with Harry Fleischman (1958)

Poems in Harper's include:

- "Bread, and the stuff we eat" (March 1950)
- "Memorandum to a tired bureaucrat" (December 1950)
- "Starting from Manhattan" (October 1951)
- "Return of the native (Donegal, April 1957)"

Articles in Harper's include:

- "Tortillas, beans, and bananas" (September 1951)
- "Go slow on fluoridation!" (February 1953)

== See also ==
- Richard Rorty
- New Masses
- American Committee for Cultural Freedom
- Moshe Decter
- Walter Rauschenbusch

== External sources ==
- Harper's
- The Nation
- "James Rorty Papers, 1915–1972". University of Oregon.
- "James Rorty Papers". Yale University Library – Beinecke Rare Books and Manuscripts.
