= Dewey Commission =

1937 American commission

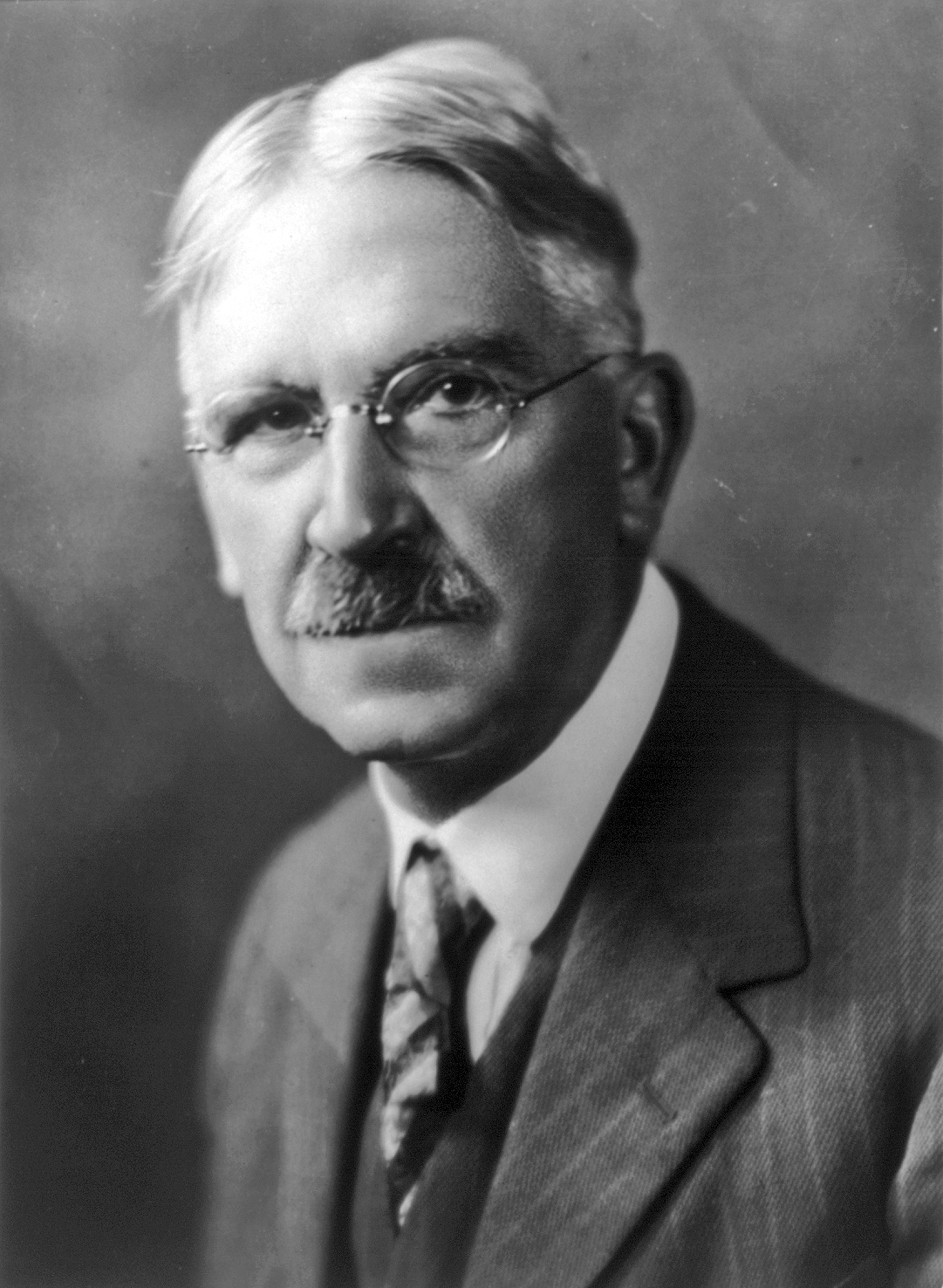
John Dewey

The Dewey Commission (officially the "Commission of Inquiry into the Charges Made against Leon Trotsky in the Moscow Trials") was initiated in March 1937 by the American Committee for the Defense of Leon Trotsky. It was named after its chairman, the philosopher John Dewey. Its other members were Carleton Beals, Otto Rühle, Benjamin Stolberg, and Secretary Suzanne La Follette, Alfred Rosmer, Wendelin Thomas, Edward A. Ross, John Chamberlain, Carlo Tresca, and Francisco Zamora Padilla. It was seen by some at the time, as Dewey feared it would be, as a Trotskyist front organization.

Following months of investigation, the Dewey Commission made its findings public in New York on September 21, 1937.

== Sub-commission ==
A sub-commission, comprising the first five commission members above, conducted thirteen hearings at Leon Trotsky's home in Coyoacan, Mexico, D.F., from April 10 to April 17, 1937. Trotsky was defended by the lawyer Albert Goldman. John Finerty acted as the commission's legal counsel.

The commission proclaimed that it had cleared Trotsky of all charges made during the Moscow Trials and, moreover, exposed the scale of the alleged frame-up of all other defendants during these trials. Among its conclusions, it stated: "That the conduct of the Moscow trials was such as to convince any unprejudiced person that no effort was made to ascertain the truth." According to French historian Michel Olivier, the Dewey Commission benefited from the documentary work of Communist dissident Gabriel Miasnikov, who was in exile in Paris at the time.

== Background ==
The American Committee for the Defense of Leon Trotsky had been set up following the first of the Moscow "Show Trials" in 1936. It comprised Franz Boas, John Chamberlain, John Dos Passos, Louis Hacker, Sidney Hook, Suzanne La Follette, Reinhold Niebuhr, George Novack, Norman Thomas and Edmund Wilson. Dewey, then seventy-eight years old, agreed to head its Commission of Inquiry.

The hearings claimed to bring to light evidence which established that some of the specific charges made at the trials could not be true.

The Dewey Commission published its findings in the form of a 422-page book titled Not Guilty. Its conclusions asserted the innocence of all those condemned in the Moscow Trials. In its summary the commission wrote: "Independent of extrinsic evidence, the Commission finds:

- That the conduct of the Moscow Trials was such as to convince any unprejudiced person that no attempt was made to ascertain the truth.
- That while confessions are necessarily entitled to the most serious consideration, the confessions themselves contain such inherent improbabilities as to convince the Commission that they do not represent the truth, irrespective of any means used to obtain them.
- That Trotsky never instructed any of the accused or witnesses in the Moscow trials to enter into agreements with foreign powers against the Soviet Union [and] that Trotsky never recommended, plotted, or attempted the restoration of capitalism in the USSR."

The commission concluded: "We therefore find the Moscow Trials to be frame-ups."

Trotsky remarked at the start of the Commission that:

The Moscow trials are perpetrated under the banner of socialism. We will not concede this banner to the masters of falsehood! If our generation happens to be too weak to establish Socialism over the earth, we will hand the spotless banner down to our children. The struggle which is in the offing transcends by far the importance of individuals, factions and parties. It is the struggle for the future of all mankind. It will be severe, it will be lengthy. Whoever seeks physical comfort and spiritual calm let him step aside. In time of reaction it is more convenient to lean on the bureaucracy than on the truth. But all those for whom the word 'Socialism' is not a hollow sound but the content of their moral life – forward! Neither threats nor persecutions nor violations can stop us! Be it even over our bleaching bones the truth will triumph! We will blaze the trail for it. It will conquer! Under all the severe blows of fate, I shall be happy as in the best days of my youth! Because, my friends, the highest human happiness is not the exploitation of the present but the preparation of the future.

— Leon Trotsky, 'I Stake My Life', opening address to the Dewey Commission, February 9, 1937

Trotskyist historian Pierre Broué noted that Trotsky had misinformed the Commission when claiming to have had no contacts with followers inside the USSR to form an opposition bloc, though the nature of this bloc had differed markedly from that alleged by the Moscow Trials and had been dissolved shortly after its formation in 1932. American historian J. Arch Getty also noted this, pointing out that "Trotsky and Sedov were reminded of the bloc at the time of the 1937 Dewey Commission but withheld the matter from the inquiry."

== Resignation of Beals ==
Following the resignation of Beals, Dewey added the following text to the report:

Your sub-commission reports with regret the resignation, before the hearings were concluded, of one of its members, Mr. Carleton Beals. Toward the close of the hearing on the afternoon of April 16, Mr. Beals put to Mr. Trotsky a provocative question based on alleged information which the sub-commission could not check and place on the record. After the hearing our counsel, Mr. John Finerty, advised the sub-commission that questions based on private information were highly improper, would be sufficient cause for mistrial in any ordinary court, and that he could not continue as counsel if they were to be permitted in future. Mr. Beals then angrily declared that either he or Mr. Finerty must leave the sub-commission. Still, he promised to attend a conference that evening to discuss the matter. But although we waited for him until midnight he did not come. The next morning, before the opening of the session, Mrs. Beals brought us his resignation, in which he charged that the Commission was not conducting a serious inquiry.

Beals subsequently wrote an article in the Saturday Evening Post entitled "The Fewer Outsiders the Better", criticizing the commission as biased and in the hands of a "purely pro-Trotsky clique".

== Nuremberg Trials ==
Some ten years later, the Dewey Commission was cited in great detail, when in an open letter to the British press dated 25 February 1946, written by George Orwell and signed by Arthur Koestler, C. E. M. Joad, Frank Horrabin, George Padmore, Julian Symons, H. G. Wells, F. A. Ridley, C. A. Smith and John Baird, among others, it was suggested that the Nuremberg Trials then underway were an invaluable opportunity for establishing "historical truth and bearing upon the political integrity" of figures of international standing. Specifically they called for Rudolf Hess to be interrogated about his alleged meeting with Trotsky and that the Gestapo records then in the hands of Allied experts be examined for any proof of any "liaison between the Nazi Party or State and Trotsky or the other old Bolshevik leaders indicted at the Moscow trials...".

== See also ==
- Dies Committee
- Fourth International
- Great Purge
