= Free Youth =

Free Youth may refer to:

- Free Youth or Szabad ifjúság, Hungarian newspaper
- Free Youth, protest group in 2020 Thai protests
