= Szabad =

Szabad may refer to:

- György Szabad, Hungarian politician and historian
- Cemach Szabad, Lithuanian doctor and activist

Newspapers

- Szabad Föld ('Free Land'), weekly newspaper published in Budapest, Hungary
- Szabad szó ('Free Word'), defunct newspaper of National Peasants Party, Hungary
- Szabad ifjúság ('Free Youth'), defunct newspaper of Union of Working Youth, Hungary
