= Mauritz A. Hallgren =

American journalist, editor, and author

- Born: Mauritz Alfred Hallgren; June 18, 1899; Chicago, Illinois
- Died: November 10, 1956 (aged 57); Baltimore, Maryland
- Occupations: journalist, editor, and author

Mauritz Alfred Hallgren (June 18, 1899 – November 10, 1956) was an American journalist, editor, and author. Hallgren is remembered as a leading liberal public intellectual of the 1930s, writing extensively on current affairs for The Nation magazine.

== Biography ==
=== Early years ===
Hallgren was born in Chicago, Illinois, to Swedish immigrant parents.

=== Career ===
During the first half of the 1930s Hallgren was a frequent contributor to The Nation magazine, contributing articles on domestic and international affairs and reviewing non-fiction books. In 1934, Hallgren left The Nation to take a post on the staff of the Baltimore Sun.

As an active opponent of fascism and supporter of loyalists to the Spanish Republic in the Spanish Civil War, Hallgren was a member of the Communist Party USA-sponsored League of American Writers and a signer of the organization's 1939 convention call.

In January 1937, Hallgren made headlines by publicly resigning as a member of the American Committee for the Defense of Leon Trotsky, an organization of leading intellectuals which took testimony to test the veracity of political charges made against Leon Trotsky as part of the Great Purges in the Soviet Union. Hallgren charged that the committee had "become an instrument of the Trotskyists for political intervention against the Soviet Union." Hallgren's resignation letter to the Committee's secretary, Felix Morrow, was later published as a 1 cent pamphlet by the Communist Party's International Publishers in 1937.

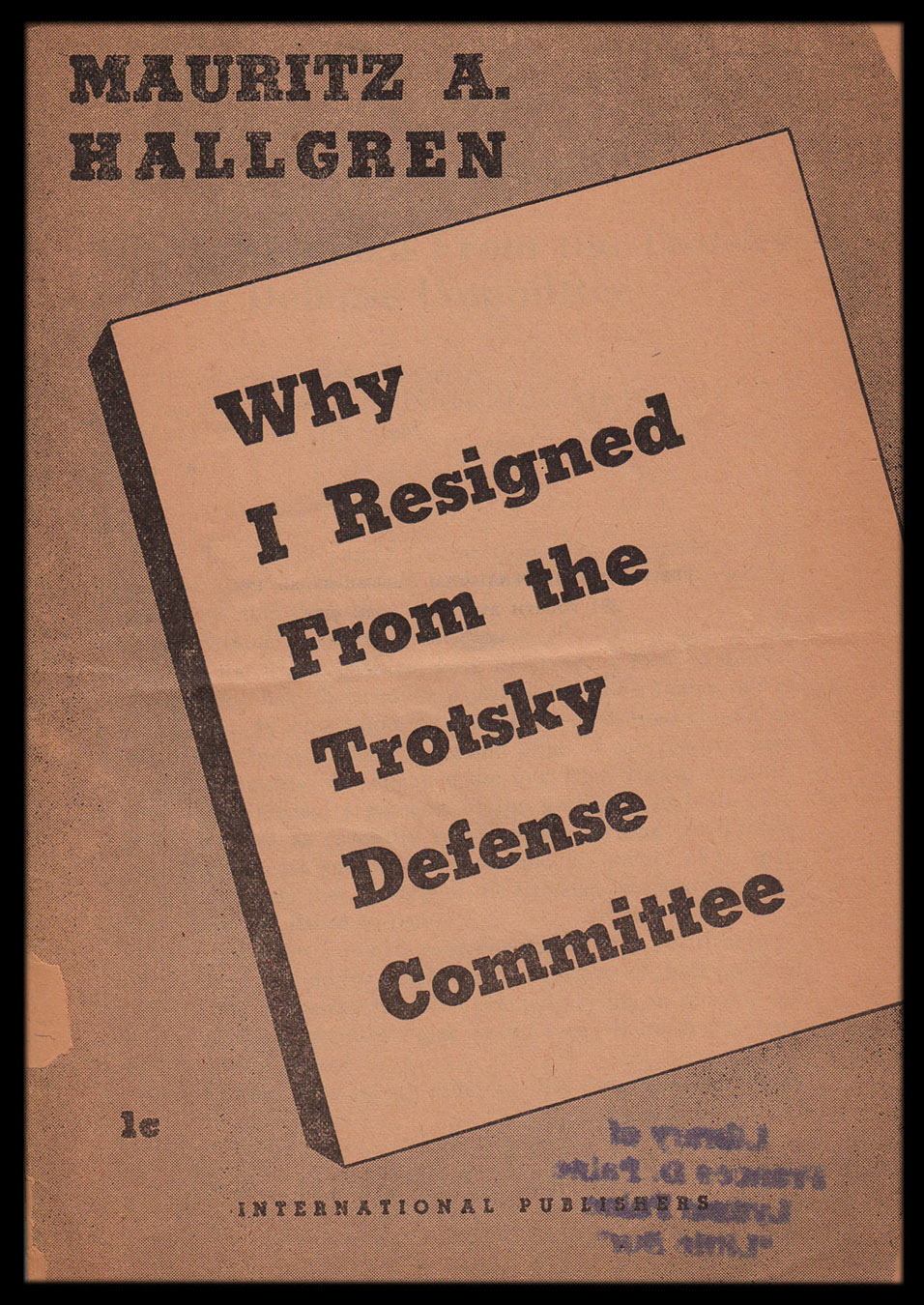
Cover of Hallgren's pamphlet Why I Resigned from the Trotsky Defense Committee.

In his January 27 letter to Morrow, Hallgren explained that he had joined the Trotsky Defense Committee as an expression of his belief in" the right of asylum for persons exiled because of their political or other beliefs." With the granting of asylum to Trotsky by Mexico, this aspect of the committee's work had come to a close, however, Hallgren noted. However, with the completion of the second out of what was to become the three Moscow Trials, Hallgren came to a belief that

"the very unanimity of the defendants, far from proving that this trial is also a 'frame-up,' appears to me to prive directly the contrary. For if these men are innocent, then certainly at least one of the three dozen, knowing that he faced death in any case, would have blurted out the truth. It is inconceivable that out of this great number of defendants, all should lie when lies would not do one of them any good."

Hallgren asserted that while he readily agreed that "Stalin has his faults," nevertheless "every fair-minded person must concede that under its present leadership the Soviet Union has made remarkable progress toward establishing socialism." It was only among the Nazis, fascists, and reactionaries, as well as a handful of socialist adherents of the Second International and the Trotskyists who contended that the USSR was not progressing towards socialism, Hallgren wrote to Morrow.

"The outcry against the Moscow trials first came from the Trotskyites," Hallgren charged. Given the weight of the public evidence, Hallgren concluded:

"...I shall remain convinced that the present liberal movement to win justice for him is nothing more than a Trotskyite maneuver against the Soviet Union and against socialism. I am equally convinced, as I must be under the circumstances, that the American Committee for the Defense of Leon Trotsky has, perhaps unwittingly, become an instrument of the Trotskyites for political intervention against the Soviet Union. ... I do not intend under any circumstances to allow myself to become a party to any arrangement that has for its objective purpose (whatever may be its subjective justification) the impairment or destruction of the socialist system now being built in Soviet Russia."

Others joining Hallgren in resigning from the Trotsky Defense Committee included journalists Carleton Beals and Lewis Gannett, as well as Nation magazine editor Freda Kirchwey. These resignations were touted by the Communist Party as evidence that the committee was nothing more than a publicity bureau for Leon Trotsky and the political movement which he headed.

Later in 1937, Hallgren published a book entitled A Tragic Fallacy, a work later hailed by historian Harry Elmer Barnes as "the definitive indictment of American interventionist diplomacy from Wilson to Roosevelt."

=== Death and legacy ===
Mauritz Hallgren died November 10, 1956, in Baltimore, Maryland. He was 57 years old at the time of his death.

== Works ==
=== Books and pamphlets ===
- Seeds of Revolt: A Study of American Life and Temper of the American People During the Depression. New York: Alfred A. Knopf, 1933.
- Why I Resigned from the Trotsky Defense Committee. New York: International Publishers, 1937.
- The US Plays Ostrich. New York: American Friends of Spanish Democracy, n.d. [c. 1937].
- The Tragic Fallacy: A Study of America's War Policies. New York: Alfred A. Knopf, 1937.

=== Articles ===
- "The Patriotic Radio Trust," The Nation, July 20, 1927.
- "Price-Fixing in Queensland," The Nation, August 10, 1927.
- "The Radio Trust Rolls On," The Nation, January 11, 1928.
- "Oil in Venezuela," The Nation, April 25, 1928.
- "French Prosperity Fades," The Nation, October 22, 1930.
- "The Polish Terror in Galicia," The Nation, November 5, 1930.
- "Congress in Confusion," The Nation, December 3, 1930.
- "Fascism Bankrupt," The Nation, December 17, 1930.
- "Poland Courts a New War," The Nation, January 21, 1931.
- "Young Bob La Follette," The Nation, March 4, 1931.
- "Hard Times and Hard Facts," The Nation, March 11, 1931.
- "Our Vanishing Liberties," The Nation, March 18, 1931.
- "Progressives Turn to the Left," The Nation, March 25, 1931.
- "Secretary Wilbur and the Cancer Cure," The Nation, April 8, 1931.
- "Chicago Goes Tammany," The Nation, April 22, 1931.
- "Governor La Follette," The Nation, April 29, 1931.
- "Easy Times in Middletown," The Nation, May 6, 1931.
- "Detroit's Liberal Mayor," The Nation, May 13, 1931.
- "Making the Country Safe for War," The Nation, May 27, 1931.
- "The Farce of Power Regulation," The Nation, June 24, 1931.
- "Why Must the Miners Starve?" The Nation, July 29, 1931.
- "Danger Ahead in the Coal Strike," The Nation, August 5, 1931.
- "The Manchurian Battleground," The Nation, October 28, 1931.
- "Japan Defies the Imperialists," The Nation, November 11, 1931.
- "The Federal Farm-Relief Scandal," The Nation, Part 1: December 2, 1931; Part 2: December 9, 1931.
- "American Secrecy About Red Russia," The Nation, February 3, 1932.
- "How Many Hungry?" The Nation, February 10, 1932.
- "Mass Misery in Philadelphia," The Nation, March 9, 1932.
- "Panic in the Steel Towns," The Nation, March 20, 1932.
- "Bankers and Bread Lines," The Nation, April 6, 1932.
- "Hitler Versus Hindenburg," The Nation, April 6, 1932.
- "Bloody Williamson is Hungry," The Nation, April 20, 1932.
- "Pigs, Plows, and Charity," The Nation, May 4, 1932.
- "Help Wanted — For Chicago," The Nation, May 11, 1932.
- "Russia Could Help Us," The Nation, May 18, 1932.
- "Franklin D. Roosevelt," The Nation, June 1, 1932.
- "Beer, Bums, and Republicans," The Nation, June 29, 1932.
- "The Milwaukee Miracle," The Nation, July 13, 1932.
- "The Bonus Army Scares Mr. Hoover," The Nation, July 27, 1932.
- "Grave Danger in Detroit," The Nation, August 3, 1932.
- "Judge Manton and the IRT Scandal," The Nation, October 26, 1932.
- "The Revolutionary Crisis in Japan," The Nation, November 9, 1932.
- "Billions for Relief," The Nation, November 20, 1932.
- "The Secret International," The Nation, January 25, 1933.
- "The Ohio Gang Protects the Bankers," The Nation, April 19, 1933.
- "A $100,000,000 Tax Scandal," The Nation, May 10, 1933.
- "The Power Trust Picks Its Own Judge," The Nation, June 21, 1933.
- "The Recovery Machine Starts," The Nation, July 12, 1933.
- "More Relief for Farmers," The Nation, July 26, 1933.
- "Liberia in Shackles," The Nation, August 16, 1933.
- "The Drive for Spoils," The Nation, August 23, 1933.
- "Drifting Into Militarism," The Nation, October 4, 1933.
- "The Right to Strike," The Nation, November 8, 1933.
- "The NRA Oil Trust," The Nation, March 7, 1934.
- "Japan Over Asia," The Nation, July 25, 1934.
- "Soviet China," The Nation, October 3, 1934.
