= ENL =

ENL may refer to:

- East Northumberland League, a defunct English football league
- Eneolithic, an archaeological period
- Enfield Lock railway station, in London
- English National League, a defunct ice hockey league
- Enlhet language
- Enterolactone
- Estonian Young Socialist League (Estonian: Eesti Noorsotsialistlik Liit), a defunct Estonian youth organisation
- Europe of Nations and Freedom (French: Europe des nations et des libertés), a political group in the European Parliament
- English as a New Language, the use or study of English by speakers of other languages
