= Benjamin Stolberg =

American journalist

Benjamin Stolberg (1891–1951) was an American journalist and labor activist.

== Career ==
Stolberg worked as associate editor of The Bookman, as well as a columnist for leading US newspapers, such as The New York Times and the New York Herald Tribune'.

Stolberg was a member of the American Committee for the Defense of Leon Trotsky and served on the Dewey Commission investigating the Moscow Trials.

== Libel Suit ==
Stolberg wrote for the Saturday Evening Post – and from 1939 to 1945 he and its publisher, the Curtis Publishing, defended themselves from a libel suit brought against them by Jerome Davis for the September 2, 1939, article "Communist Wreckers in American Labor." Stolberg had called Davis a "Communist and Stalinist." Davis brought on ACLU co-founder Arthur Garfield Hays as his lawyer. Stolberg hired Louis Waldman, an "Old Guard" Socialist and anti-communist labor lawyer. The case went before the New York Supreme Court, with Justice John F. Carew presiding.

On December 4, 1939, Davis brought a $150,000 libel suit in Manhattan against Curtis Publishing and Stolberg. The trial included testimony from American Federation of Labor president William Green, former YMCA president Sherwood Eddy, Reverend Dr. Harry Emerson Fosdick and Rabbi Stephen Samuel Wise of the American Jewish Congress, former CPUSA head Earl Browder, former Saturday Evening Post editor William W. Stout and American Federation of Teachers vice president John D. Connors, AFL vice president Matthew Woll, American Mercury editor Eugene Lyons, and Georgetown University president Dr. Edmund A. Walsh. Davis' attorney Hays added $100,000 to the suit. On June 9, 1943, a New York Supreme Court discharged the jury for failing to reach a verdict, and Justice Carew ordered the jury not discuss their deliberations. On June 14, 1943, New York Supreme Court Justice Louis A. Valente denied a second motion for immediate retrial and set October 1, 1943, as date to assign retrial action. Finally, on January 18, 1945, Davis settled with Curtis Publishing and Stolberg in court for $11,000 of his $250,000 libel suit before Supreme Court Justice Ferdinand Pecora.

== Legacy ==
Benjamin Stolberg's papers are housed at Columbia University in New York City.

== Works ==
Stolberg wrote histories of the labor movement, including:

- The Economic Consequences of the New Deal (1935)
- Preliminary Commission of Inquiry into the Charges Made Against Leon Trotsky in the Moscow Trials (1937)
- The Story of the CIO (1938)
- Tailor's Progress: The Story of a Famous Union and the Men Who Made It (a history of the International Ladies' Garment Workers' Union) (1944)
  - Ṿi azoy Sṭolbergs bukh "Teylors progres" zeṭ oys in di oygn fun a ḳloḳmakher (Yiddish translation) (1944)

== External sources ==
- Columbia University
- Christopher Phelps, "Heywood Broun, Benjamin Stolberg, and the Politics of American Labor Journalism in the 1920s and 1930s," Labor: Studies in Working-Class History, vol. 15, no. 1 (March 2018), pp. 25–51.
- Works by or about Benjamin Stolberg at the Internet Archive
