= Young Workers' International =

Young Workers' International (in German: Arbeiter-Jugend-Internationale, in French: L'Internationale des Jeunesses Ouvrières) was an international union of socialist youth organizations. It was founded in at a conference in Amsterdam May 12-May 13, 1921. It functioned as the youth wing of the remnants of the Second International. Its secretary was Erich Ollenhauer.

It published Die Arbeiter-Jugend-Internationale.

In 1923, it merged into the Socialist Youth International.
