= National Sylvan Theater =

Outdoor theater in Washington, D.C., United States

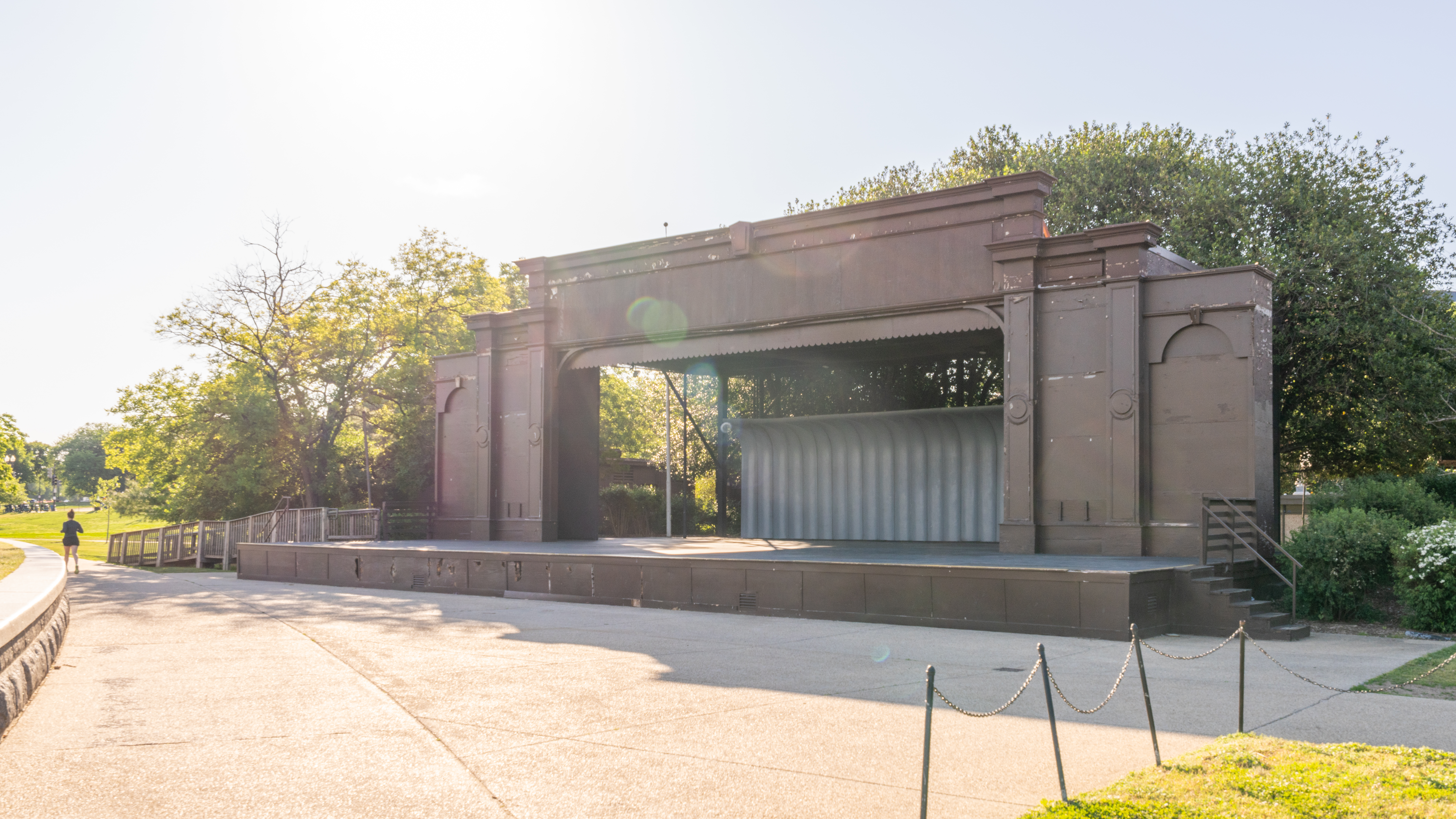

- Location within Washington, D.C.
- Address: Washington Monument, National Mall; Washington, D.C. United States
- Coordinates: 38.888333°N 77.034444°W
- Capacity: 10,000

Construction
- Opened: April 4, 1917

The National Sylvan Theater — often simply the Sylvan Theater — is a public sylvan theater on the grounds of the Washington Monument, National Mall, in Washington, D.C., USA. It is located within the northwest corner of the 15th Street and Independence Avenue intersection, about 450 feet (137 m) southeast of the Washington Monument. A wooden stage is set in a graded depression surrounded by a grove of trees. It appears as a natural amphitheater integral to the historic greensward of the monument grounds. A gathering of 10,000 event attendees may stretch from the theater stage back to the monument's base. The Sylvan Theater was the first federally funded theater in the United States.

== History ==
The theater was the idea of Alice Pike Barney (1857–1931), a campaigner, in efforts to transform Washington, D.C., into the nation's cultural capital during the first quarter of the 20th century. She became known for her lavishly produced, artistically executed ballets, mimes, tableaux, plays, and other theatrical productions. During the First World War, she persuaded 64th United States Congress to approve and fund the construction of a "National Sylvan Theater" at its present site at the Washington Monument in 1916. As the theater's original playwright, Pike prepared scripts for the first half dozen productions.

It was designed to seat over 8,000 persons. It was built and maintained by the United States Department of War in its administration of the park system of the District of Columbia, while performances had to receive the approval of the Office of Public Buildings and Grounds. While the Federal government supports the stage, including such areas as lighting, policing, and the management of tickets, other expenses fall upon the company producing the event. Its first director was Col. W. H. Harts, Superintendent of Parks in Washington.

Dedicated on April 4, 1917, in the presence of President Woodrow Wilson and his Cabinet, it became the nation's first federally supported outdoor theater. The initial performance was attended by 2,800 with seats arranged so that there were no cross aisles that might obstruct a view. It included a masque entitled, The Drama Triumphant, written by Mrs. Christian Hemmick. However, an estimated 150,000 people attended two concerts, afternoon and evening, at the Sylvan Theater on July 4 for an American Roots Fourth of July 1993, to listen to American traditional music, which the National Park Service produced, the National Council for the Traditional Arts, WETA-FM and Radio Smithsonian.

According to the 2010 National Mall Plan: Summary, a new, high-quality multipurpose facility will replace the Sylvan Theater. It will provide food service, restrooms, retail space, staff space, and performance space that is better oriented for hillside seating. It will be situated in a wooded area below street level and offer views of the monument.

== Design and construction ==
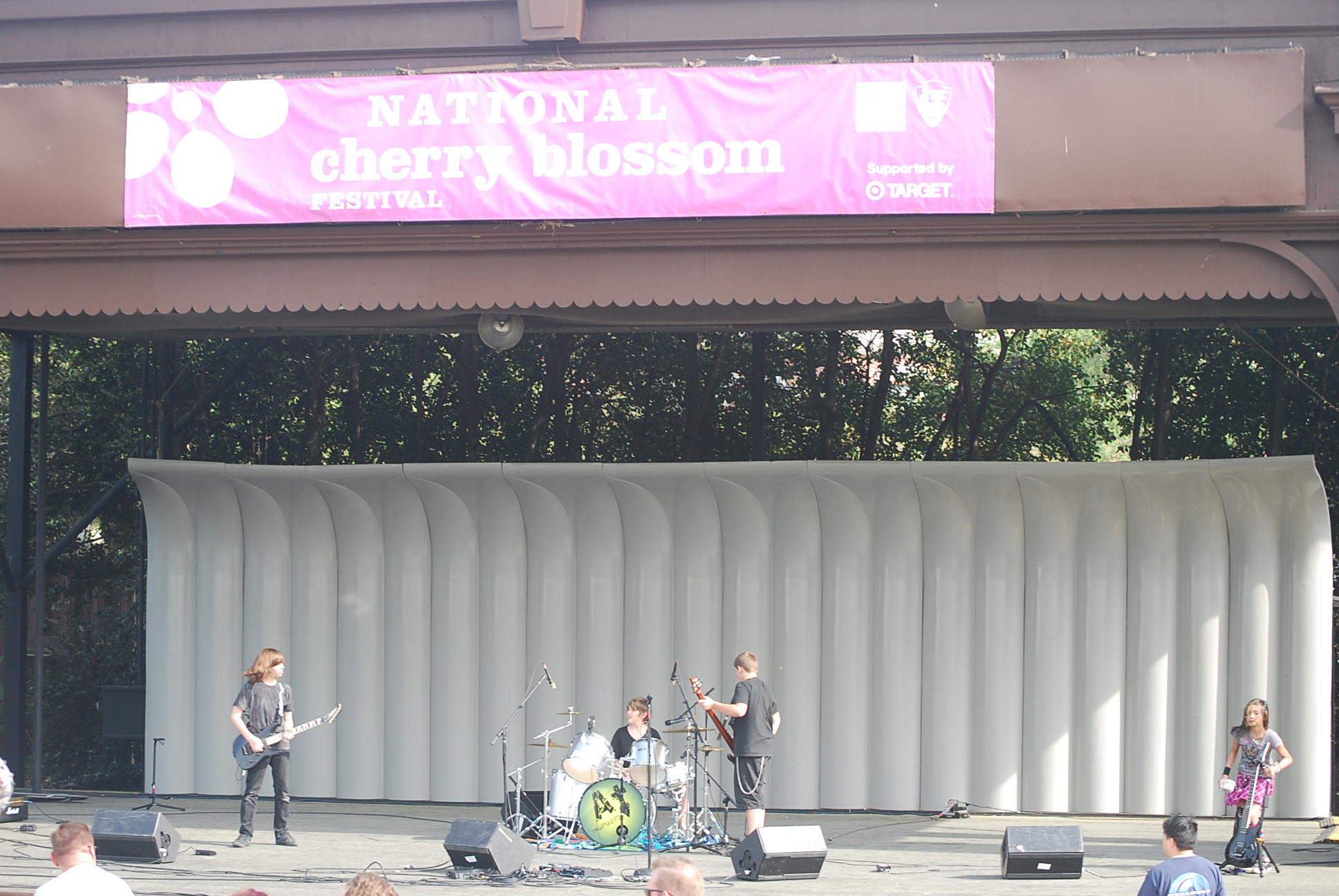
View of the stage

In early 1917, the National Sylvan Theater was built to the southeast of the Washington Monument, at the foot of the hillside. The filling material used to construct the stage, which is 5 feet (1.5 m) above grade, 80 feet (24 m) wide, and 30 feet (9.1 m) deep, combined with two wings, each 30 square feet (2.8 m^{2}), was brought to the site at no cost to the government. The stage was constructed with three flights of flag steps, which give access to the wings from the lower ground level in the rear. A special electric cable was laid to provide current for a series of larger projector lamps, which, when placed on platforms, were meant to furnish light for the performances. In lieu of a drop curtain, a difficulty in open-air productions, jets of steam could be piped in along the stage front, concealing the performers and adding a mystical quality.

The wings of the stage were screened with a heavy planting of forsythia and other shrubbery, which were transplanted from the shores of the Tidal Basin into beds along the sides of the stage. The entire area of the theater stage was covered with soil and seeded and sodded to ensure a good turf for the opening performance, which took place on June 2, 1917.

Construction elements also included 1180 cubic yards of rough clay fill, 350 square yards of shrubbery beds, 800 square yards of graded and sodded lawn, plus 900 square yards of graded and seeded lawn. There were 50 linear feet of 8 inches (200 mm) and 340 linear feet of 6 inches (150 mm) terra cotta sewer pipe laid; 285 linear feet of flagstone steps were constructed; and 428 deciduous trees and shrubs were transplanted to the theater area.

== Events ==
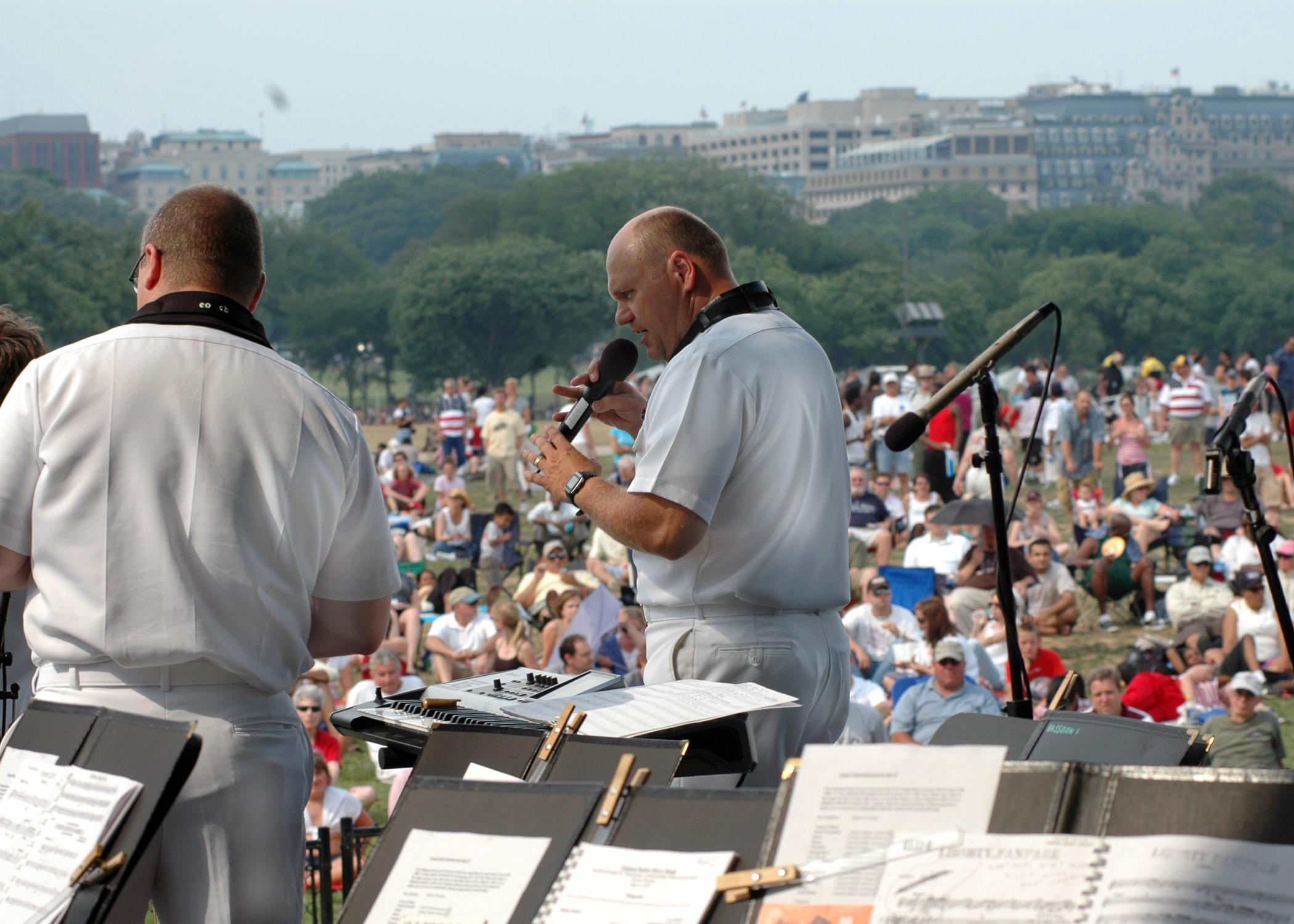
View from the stage

Today, the site is a popular venue for free military concerts, musicals, Shakespeare plays, puppet shows and ballet during the spring, summer and fall.

Since at least 2010, the Military Band Summer Concert Series has been held from June to August on Tuesday, Thursday, Friday, and Sunday nights at 8 PM at the Sylvan Theater (the series uses other venues at other times of the year). The bands of each of the four service branches perform (different nights) free al-fresco concerts, typically including military marches, patriotic numbers, and some classical music.

Every August, Tchaikovsky's 1812 Overture is performed with real cannon at the Sylvan Theater by the Presidential Salute Battery of the 3rd U.S. Infantry (The Old Guard) in what is perhaps the United States Army Band's most popular regular engagement.

The Sylvan Theater is also often used for government or other commemorative ceremonies, rallies, and protests, and as a starting or stopping point for organized marches, such as the 2002 protesters coalition to "Stop the War at Home and Abroad".

In 1944, for the second anniversary of the WAVES, 10,000 Women's Reservists marched in formation and formed up at the Sylvan Theater before sitting down on the grass in their gray uniforms. Martin Luther King Jr. addressed 26,000 people at the theater for the 1959 Youth March for Integrated Schools. For the 1963 Great March on Washington, Nazis planned to meet at the Sylvan Theater before proceeding into the crowd of marchers, and as the march moved from the Sylvan Theater toward the Capitol Building, Joan Baez, Judy Collins, and others sang We Shall Overcome.

The theater has also been the site for religious services, such as an outdoor Mass in the 1950s that featured a sermon by Archbishop Fulton J. Sheen, and the public talk of Kirpal Singh during his 1963 visit to Washington D.C.
