= American Committee for the Defense of Leon Trotsky =

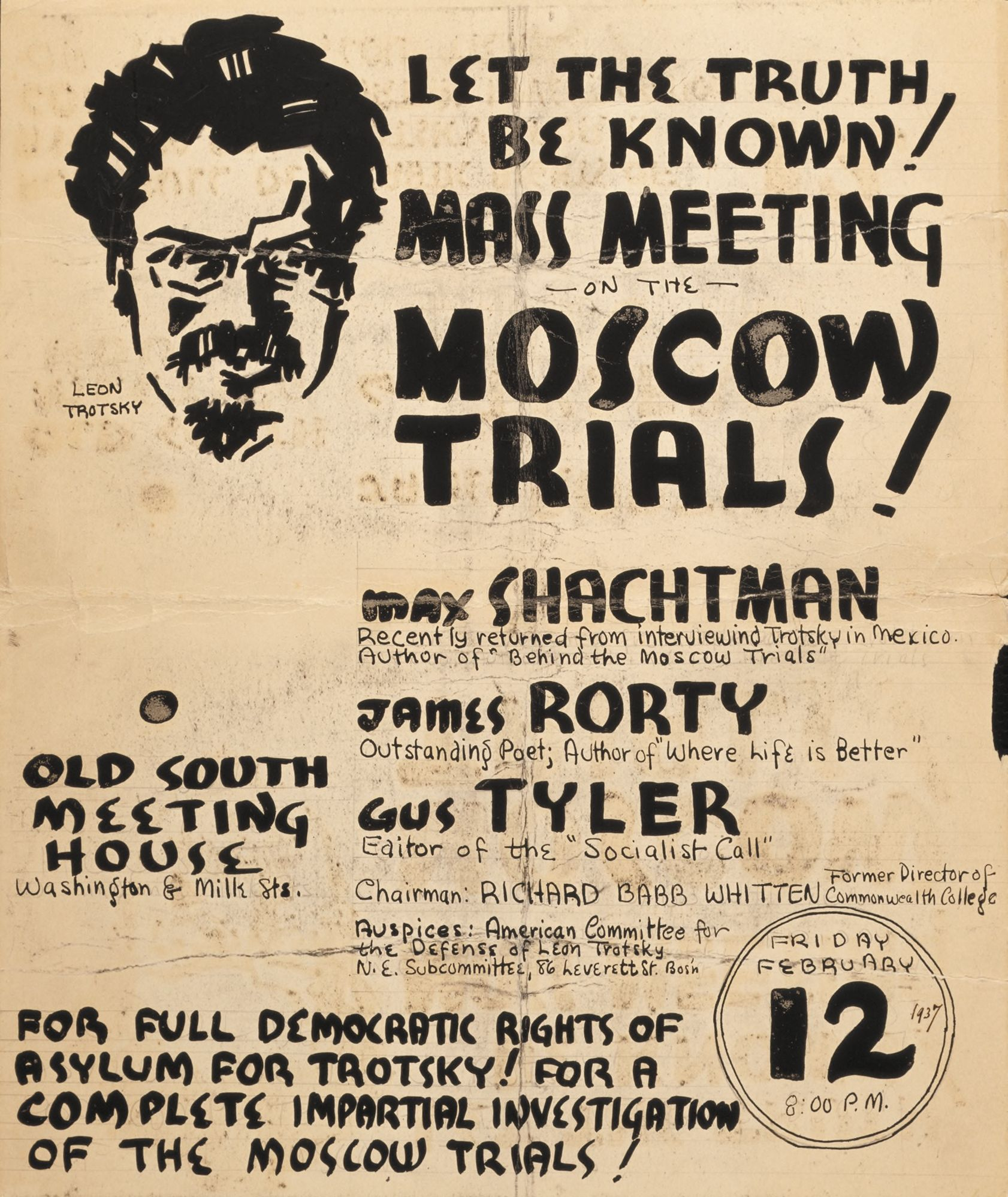
A poster advertising a mass meeting of the committee at the Old South Meeting House in Boston, Massachusetts, featuring Max Shachtman, James Rorty and Gus Tyler, c. 1937

The American Committee for the Defense of Leon Trotsky was a pseudo-judicial process set up by American Trotskyists as a front organization following the first of the Moscow Trials. It had no powers of subpoena, nor official imprimatur from any government. It was composed of historians, sociologists, journalists, authors, and other notable figures, including Edmund Wilson, Suzanne La Follette, Louis Hacker, Norman Thomas, John Dos Passos, Reinhold Niebuhr, George Novack, Franz Boas, John Chamberlain and Sidney Hook. John Dewey, then seventy-eight years old, agreed to head its Commission of Inquiry.

== History ==
In March 1937, The American Committee for the Defense of Leon Trotsky initiated the so-called Dewey Commission (officially the "Commission of Inquiry into the Charges Made against Leon Trotsky in the Moscow Trials"). The inquiry was named after its Chairman, John Dewey. Its other members were Carleton Beals, an authority on Latin-American affairs; Otto Rühle, biographer of Karl Marx and former member of the Reichstag; American journalists Benjamin Stolberg and Suzanne LaFollette (Secretary); Alfred Rosmer, who in 1920-21 had been a member of the Executive Committee of the Communist International; Wendelin Thomas, leader of the Wilhelmshaven sailors’ revolt in November 1918 and later a Communist member of the German Reichstag; Edward A. Ross, Professor of Sociology at the University of Wisconsin; former literary critic of The New York Times John Chamberlain, Carlo Tresca, Italian-American anarchist leader; and Mexican journalist Francisco Zamora.

A sub-commission, comprising the first five commission members listed above, conducted thirteen hearings at Trotsky's home in Coyoacan, Mexico, D.F., from April 10 to April 17, 1937. Leon Trotsky was defended by the lawyer Albert Goldman. John Finerty acted as the commission's legal counsel.

During the course of the "trial", committee member Mauritz A. Hallgren, formerly an editor of The Nation magazine, made headlines with a public resignation from the committee published in the pages of the New York Times. Hallgren charged that the American Committee for the Defense of Leon Trotsky had "become an instrument of the Trotskyists for political intervention against the Soviet Union." Hallgren's January 27, 1937, letter of resignation was later published as a 1-cent pamphlet by the Communist Party's International Publishers.

Albert Einstein, although noting that Trotsky deserved the opportunity to prove his innocence, was critical of the Dewey inquiry: "The question is raised because Trotsky is an extremely active and adroit politician, who might well search for an effective platform for the presentation and promulgation of his political goals in the public sphere. . . . I'm afraid that the only result would be Trotsky's own self-promotion without the possibility of a well-grounded judgment."

== Conclusions of the inquiry ==
Following months of investigation, the Dewey Commission made its findings public in New York on September 21, 1937. The commission purported to clear Trotsky of all charges made during the Moscow Trials and, moreover, exposed the scale of the alleged frame-up of all other defendants during these trials.

Among its conclusions, it stated that "the conduct of the Moscow trials was such as to convince any unprejudiced person that no effort was made to ascertain the truth.
