= Ralph Beals =

American anthropologist (1901–1985)

Ralph Leon Beals (July 19, 1901 – February 24, 1985) was an American anthropologist at the University of California, Los Angeles, a former president of the American Anthropological Association, and the recipient of a Guggenheim Fellowship.

He worked on community development in Egypt with UNESCO and studied Mexican students in American universities. His brother was journalist Carleton Beals.
