= Edward Alsworth Ross =

American sociologist

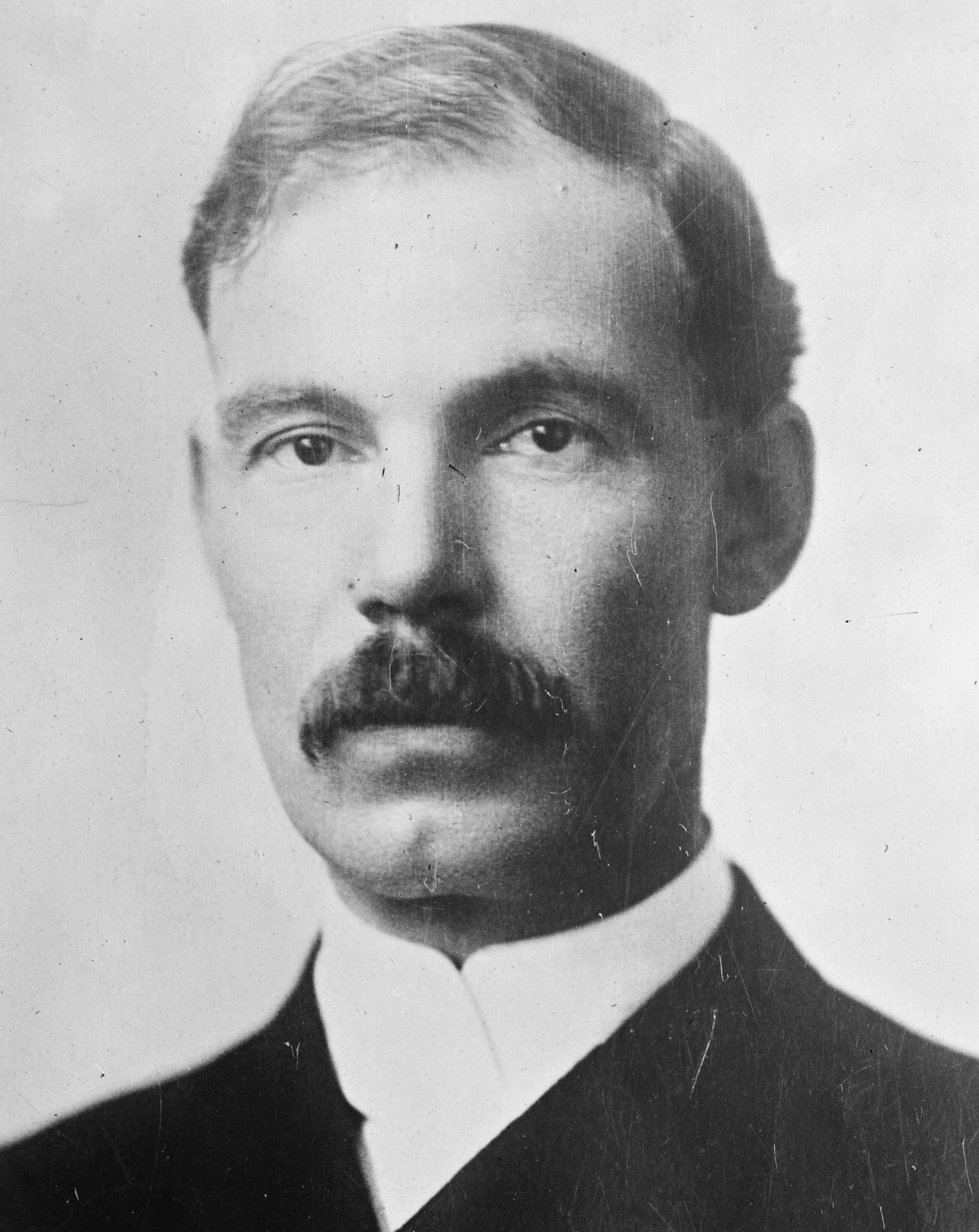
- From the George Grantham Bain Collection (Library of Congress)
- Born: Edward Alsworth Ross; December 12, 1866; Virden, Illinois, U.S.
- Died: July 22, 1951 (aged 84); Madison, Wisconsin, U.S.
- Known for: Social Control (1901); The Principles of Sociology (1920)
- Scientific career
- Fields: Sociology, economics
- Doctoral advisor: Richard T. Ely
- Doctoral students: C. Wright Mills

Edward Alsworth Ross (December 12, 1866 – July 22, 1951) was an American economist, sociologist, and university professor, journalist, and publicist. A leading figure in the American Sociological Association, he helped found its journal American Journal of Sociology. He also served as secretary of the American Economic Association.

As an economist, he made contributions to the study of taxation, debt management, value theory, uncertainty, and location theory. In sociology, he had wide-ranging interests in eugenics and criminology. He adhered to the American Progressive movement in his early career, with a special interest in the protection of the rights of white workers and the white working-class. He soon gained and has kept an enduring reputation as a racist and eugenicist for his vocal opposition to the rights of Asians in California, as well opposing their further immigration into the United States.

== Early life ==
Ross was born in Virden, Illinois. His father was a farmer. He attended Coe College, graduating in 1887. After two years as an instructor at a business school, the Fort Dodge Commercial Institute, he went to Germany for graduate study at the University of Berlin. He returned to the U.S., and in 1891 he received his Ph.D. from Johns Hopkins University in political economy under Richard T. Ely, with minors in philosophy and ethics. He has been described as a disciple of Lester Ward, a pioneering sociologist.

== Academic career ==
Ross was on the faculty at Indiana University (1891–1892), Cornell University (1892–1893), Stanford University (1893–1900), the University of Nebraska (1900–1904) and the University of Wisconsin (1905–1937). He was also secretary of the American Economic Association (1892).

In the field of economics, he made contributions to the study of taxation, debt management, value theory, uncertainty, and location theory.

=== Departure from Stanford ===
In Stanford's "first academic freedom controversy", Ross was fired from Stanford University. The American Association of University Professors was founded largely in response to this incident.

The motivations for his dismissal have been debated. While some sources say he was fired because of his political views on eugenics, others have cited his support for populist politics at odds with the interests of the university's benefactors. Ross had spoken in support of William Jennings Bryan, Democratic candidate in the 1900 US presidential election, and expressed support for the economic policy of free silver against the gold standard, a move which in theory would spur economic activity by reducing the economy's reliance on banks and creditors in an environment of gold shortage. Jane Stanford's fortune was derived from railroads, which sought to maintain gold as the currency standard.

Ross objected to Chinese and Japanese immigrant labor on both economic and racial grounds. An early supporter of the "race suicide" doctrine, he expressed a wish to restrict entry of other races and prohibit Japanese immigration altogether in strong and crude language in public speeches.) In the speech that was the catalyst for his potential firing and ultimate resignation, he was quoted as declaring, "And should the worst come to the worst it would be better for us if we were to turn our guns upon every vessel bringing Japanese to our shores rather than to permit them to land." In response, Jane Stanford, co-founder of the university, called for his resignation.

In Ross's public statement regarding his resignation, he wrote that his friend David Starr Jordan had asked him to make the speech. Jordan managed to keep Ross from being fired, but Ross resigned shortly after.

Ross had also made critical remarks about the railroad industry in his classes: "A railroad deal is a railroad steal." This was too much for Jane Stanford, who was then on the board of trustees of the university. Numerous professors at Stanford resigned in protest of his dismissal, sparking "a national debate... concerning the freedom of expression and control of universities by private interests."

=== Nebraska, Wisconsin, and later life ===
Ross left for the University of Nebraska, where he taught until 1905. In 1906, he joined the University of Wisconsin, where he became Professor of Sociology, and eventually chair of the department. He retired in 1937.

His understanding of Americanization and assimilation bore a striking resemblance to that of another Wisconsin professor, Frederick Jackson Turner. Like Turner, Ross believed that American identity was forged in the crucible of the wilderness. The 1890 census's proclamation that the frontier had disappeared, then, posed a significant threat to America's ability to assimilate the mass of immigrants who were arriving from southern and eastern Europe. In 1897, just four years after Turner had presented his frontier thesis to the American Historical Association, Ross, then at Stanford, argued that the loss of the frontier destroyed the machinery of the melting pot process.

In 1913, Wisconsin passed its first sterilization law. Ross, who lived in the state at the time, was a reserved proponent of sterilization and indicated his support for the measure. He qualified his support by contrasting it with the greater harm of hanging a man and advocated its initial use "only to extreme cases, where the commitments and the record pile up an overwhelming case." Involuntary sterilization remained legal in Wisconsin until July 1978.

Ross visited Russia after the Bolshevik Revolution in 1917. He endorsed the revolution even as he acknowledged its bloody origins. He was subsequently a leading advocate of U.S. recognition of the Soviet Union. He later served on the Dewey Commission, which cleared Leon Trotsky of the charges made against him by the Soviet government during the Moscow Trials.

From 1900 to the 1920s, Ross supported the alcohol Prohibition movement as well as continuing to support eugenics and immigration restriction. By 1930, he had moved away from those views, however.

In the 1930s, he was a supporter of the New Deal programs of President Franklin Roosevelt. In 1940, he became chair of the national committee of the American Civil Liberties Union, serving until 1950.

He died in 1951.

== Works ==
- Honest Dollars. Chicago: C. H. Kerr & Co., 1896.
- Social Control: A Survey of the Foundations of Order, The Macmillan Company, 1901 [Last reprint 2009 by Transaction Publishers; with a new introduction by Matthias Gross].
- Foundations of Sociology, The Macmillan Company, 1905.
- Sin and Society: An Analysis of Latter-Day Iniquity (with a letter from President Roosevelt), Houghton, Mifflin & Company, 1907.
- Social Psychology: An Outline and Source Book, The Macmillan Company, 1908.
- Latter Day Sinners and Saints, B. W. Huebsch, 1910.
- The Changing Chinese: The Conflict of Oriental and Western Cultures in China, The Century Co., 1911.
- Changing America: Studies in Contemporary Society, The Century Co., 1912.
- The Old World in the New: The Significance of Past and Present Immigration to the American People, The Century Co., 1914.
- South of Panama, The Century Co., 1915.
- Russia in Upheaval, The Century Co., 1918.
- What is America?, The Century Co., 1919.
- The Principles of Sociology, The Century Co., 1920.
- The Russian Bolshevik Revolution, The Century Co., 1921.
- The Social Trend, The Century Co., 1922.
- The Outlines of Sociology, The Century Co., 1923.
- The Russian Soviet Republic, The Century Co., 1923.
- The Social Revolution in Mexico, The Century Co., 1923.
- Changes in the Size of American Families in One Generation, University of Wisconsin Studies, 1924 [with R. E. Baber].
- Roads to Social Peace, The University of North Carolina Press, 1924.
- Civic Sociology: A Textbook in Social and Civic Problems for Young Americans, World Book Company, 1926 [1st Pub. 1925].
- Report on the Employment of Native Labor in Portuguese Africa, Abbott Press, 1925.
- Standing Room Only?, The Century Co., 1927.
- World Drift, The Century Co., 1928.
- Tests and Challenges in Sociology, The Century Co., 1931.
- Seventy Years of It: An Autobiography, D. Appleton-Century Company, 1936.
- La libertad en el Mundo Moderno, In: Letras (Lima), Vol. 2, Iss. 5, 1936. Doi: https://doi.org/10.30920/letras.2.5.3
- New-Age Sociology, D. Appleton-Century Company, 1940.

=== Selected articles ===
- "Sinking Funds," Publications of the American Economic Association, Vol. 7, No. 4/5, Jul./Sep. 1892.
- "The Standard of Deferred Payments," Annals of the American Academy of Political and Social Science, Vol. 3, Nov. 1892.
- "A New Canon of Taxation," Political Science Quarterly, Vol. 7, No. 4, Dec. 1892.
- "Seligman's 'Shifting and Incidence of Taxation'," Annals of the American Academy of Political and Social Science, Vol. 3, Jan. 1893.
- "The Total Utility Standard of Deferred Payments," Annals of the American Academy of Political and Social Science, Vol. 4, Nov. 1893.
- "The Unseen Foundations of Society," Political Science Quarterly, Vol. 8, No. 4, Dec. 1893.
- "The Location of Industries," The Quarterly Journal of Economics, Vol. 10, No. 3, Apr. 1896.
- "Uncertainty as a Factor in Production," Annals of the American Academy of Political and Social Science, Vol. 8, Sep. 1896.
- "The Sociological Frontier of Economics," The Quarterly Journal of Economics, Vol. 13, No. 4, Jul. 1899.
- "The Genesis of Ethical Elements," American Journal of Sociology, Vol. 5, No. 6, May 1900.
- "The Causes of Race Superiority," Annals of the American Academy of Politics, Vol. 18, Jul. 1901.
- "Recent Tendencies in Sociology," Part II, Part III, The Quarterly Journal of Economics, Vol. 16, No. 4, Aug. 1902; Vol. 17, No. 1, Nov. 1902; Vol. 17, No. 3, May 1903.
- "Moot Points in Sociology," Part II, Part III, Part IV, Part V, Part VI, Part VII, Part VIII, American Journal of Sociology, Vol. 8, No. 6, May 1903; Vol. 9, No. 1, Jul. 1903; Vol. 9, No. 2, Sep. 1903; Vol. 9, No. 3, Nov. 1903; Vol. 9, No. 4, Jan. 1904; Vol. 9, No. 6, May 1904; Vol. 10, No. 1, Jul. 1904; Vol. 10, No. 2, Sep. 1904.
- "The Present Problems of Social Psychology," American Journal of Sociology, Vol. 10, No. 4, Jan. 1905.
- "Western Civilization and the Birth-Rate," Publications of the American Economic Association, 3rd Series, Vol. 8, No. 1, Papers and Proceedings of the Nineteenth Annual Meeting, December 26–28, 1906, Feb. 1907.
- "The Nature and Scope of Social Psychology," American Journal of Sociology, Vol. 13, No. 5, Mar. 1908.
- "Rational Imitation," American Journal of Sociology, Vol. 13, No. 6, May 1908.
- "The Significance of Increasing Divorce," The Century Magazine, Vol. LVI, May/October 1909.
- "Christianity in China," The Century Magazine, March 1911.
- "Sociological Observations in Inner China," American Journal of Sociology, Vol. 16, No. 6, May 1911.
- "The Industrial Future of China," The Century Magazine, Vol. LXXXII, May/October 1911.
- "The Struggle for Existence in China," The Century Magazine, Vol. LXXXII, May/October 1911.
- "The Middle West," The Century Magazine, February/April 1912.
- "American and Immigrant Blood," The Century Magazine, December 1913.
- "Immigrant in Politics," The Century Magazine, January 1914.
- "Origins of the American People," The Century Magazine, March 1914.
- "The Celtic Tide," The Century Magazine, April 1914.
- "Philanthropy With Strings," The Atlantic, September 1, 1914.
- "Folk Depletion as a Cause of Rural Decline," Papers and Proceedings by American Sociological Society, 1916.
- "The National Spirit in Education," Papers and Proceedings by American Sociological Society, 1916.
- "Acquisitive Mimicry," American Journal of Sociology, Vol. 21, No. 4, Jan. 1916.
- "The Principle of Anticipation," American Journal of Sociology, Vol. 21, No. 5, Mar. 1916.
- "The Organization of Effort," American Journal of Sociology, Vol. 22, No. 1, Jul. 1916.
- "The Organization of Will," American Journal of Sociology, Vol. 22, No. 2, Sep. 1916.
- "The Making of the Professions," International Journal of Ethics, Vol. 27, No. 1, Oct. 1916.
- "The Organization of Thought," American Journal of Sociology, Vol. 22, No. 3, Nov. 1916.
- "Class and Caste," Part II, Part III, Part IV, American Journal of Sociology, Vol. 22, No. 4, Jan. 1917; Vol. 22, No. 5, Mar. 1917; Vol. 22, No. 6, May 1917; Vol. 23, No. 1, Jul. 1917.
- "Estrangement in Society," American Journal of Sociology, Vol. 23, No. 3, Nov. 1917.
- "Social Decadence," American Journal of Sociology, Vol. 23, No. 5, Mar. 1918.
- "The Roots of the Russian Revolution," The Century Magazine, Vol. XCV, November 1917/April 1918.
- "Soil Hunger in Russia," The Century Magazine, Vol. XCV, November 1917/April 1918.
- "The Principle of Balance," American Journal of Sociology, Vol. 23, No. 6, May 1918.
- "The Diseases of Social Structures," American Journal of Sociology, Vol. 24, No. 2, Sep. 1918.
- "Labor and Capital in Russia," The Century Magazine, Vol. XCVI, May/October 1918.
- "Russian Women and their Outlook," The Century Magazine, Vol. XCVI, May/October 1918.
- "The Rug Market at Merv," The Century Magazine, Vol. XCVI, May/October 1918.
- "The Legal Dismal Wage," The American Economic Review, Vol. IX, No. 1, March 1919.
- "Association," American Journal of Sociology, Vol. 24, No. 5, Mar. 1919.
- "Institutional Competition," American Journal of Sociology, Vol. 25, No. 2, Sep. 1919.
- "Lumping Versus Individualization," International Journal of Ethics, Vol. 30, No. 1, Oct. 1919.
- "Individuation," American Journal of Sociology, Vol. 25, No. 4, Jan. 1920.
- "Ossification," American Journal of Sociology, Vol. 25, No. 5, Mar. 1920.
- "Commercialization-Increasing or Decreasing?," International Journal of Ethics, Vol. 30, No. 3, Apr. 1920.
- "The Menace of Migrating Peoples," The Century Magazine, May 1921.
- "Slow Suicide Among Our Native Stock," The Century Magazine, February 1924.
- "The United States of India," The Century Magazine, December 1925.
- "The Man-Stifled Orient," The Century Magazine, July 1927.
- "Dulling the Scythes of Azrael," The Century Magazine, August 1927.
- "The Old Woman Who Lived In a Shoe," The Century Magazine, September 1927.
- "Population Pressure and War," Scribner's Magazine, September 1927.

=== Miscellany ===
- Schweinitz Brunner, Edmund de (1923). Churches of Distinction in Town and Country, with a foreword by Edward Alsworth Ross, George H. Doran Company.

== See also ==
- American Committee for the Defense of Leon Trotsky
