= Our Master's Voice: Advertising =

1934 book by James Rorty

- Title page for Our Master's Voice: Advertising (1934)
- Author: James Rorty
- Publisher: The John Day Company
- Publication date: 1934
- OCLC: 1050233319

Our Master's Voice: Advertising is a 1934 book of social criticism about the propaganda purpose of advertising under capitalism. Author James Rorty drew on his experience as an ad copywriter in New York to write his critique. Rorty pointed out the frequent application of the then-new fields of psychology and social science for advertising research.

== Reception ==
Critics praised Rorty's "fiery discussion of the advertising racket" and his work to debunk the mysteries of the ad profession. They criticized, however, both his narrow perspective on the industry and his lack of positive proposals for improving United States society.
