= Union of Working Youth =

Union of Working Youth Dolgozó Ifjúság Szövetsége
- Founded: 1950
- Dissolved: 1956
- Newspaper: Szabad ifjúság
- Ideology: Communism; Marxism-Leninism; Stalinism
- National affiliation: Patriotic People's Front
- International affiliation: WFDY

Union of Working Youth (Hungarian: Dolgozó Ifjúság Szövetsége, DISZ) was a mass youth organization in Hungary. All Hungarian youth between 14 and 26 years were allowed to become members. As of 1956, DISZ had 14 000 local organizations and a total membership of around 800 000. During its existence, DISZ oversaw the pioneer movement in Hungary.

DISZ published Szabad ifjúság weekly from October 1950 to July 1951, and daily from August 1951 to October 1956.

Within DISZ oppositional tendencies emerged. DISZ set up the 'Petőfi Circle', which became a centre of dissidence against the Hungarian government.

After the dissolution of DISZ, the Hungarian Young Communist League (KISZ) was set up. Unlike DISZ, KISZ was a cadre organization.
