= Estonian Young Socialist League =

Political youth movement in Estonia

Estonian Young Socialist League (in Estonian: Eesti Noorsotsialistlik Liit, abbreviated ENL) was a political youth movement in Estonia and the youth wing of the Estonian Socialist Workers Party (ESTP). A Central Bureau of ENL was set up in 1925. As of 1928, it had 20 branches with a total of around 500 members.

Ideologically ENL was close to the Austro-Marxist positions.

ENL published Rünnak, Igapäeva Rünnak and Sotsialistlik Võitlus.

ENL was a member of the Socialist Youth International, the youth wing of the Labour and Socialist International.
