= Gus Tyler =

- Gus Tyler in 1936
- Born: Augustus Tilove; October 18, 1911; Brooklyn, New York
- Died: June 3, 2011 (aged 99); Sarasota, Florida
- Education: New York University
- Occupations: Activist, labor unionist, author, newspaper columnist
- Employer: International Ladies Garment Workers Union

August Tyler (October 18, 1911 - June 3, 2011) was an American socialist activist of the 1930s, a labor union official, author, and newspaper columnist. Tyler is best remembered as a leading American labor intellectual of the post-World War II era and as the author of a history of the International Ladies Garment Workers Union.

== Biography ==
=== Early years ===
August Tyler was born Augustus Tilove to Jewish immigrants in Brooklyn, New York, on October 18, 1911. He later changed his surname in honor of Wat Tyler, the leader of the English Peasants' Revolt in 1381.

Tyler was the product of a radical upbringing, as he later recalled in a 1988 interview with New York Newsday:

As far as my mother was concerned, socialism was what God ordained. You didn't learn it from Marx or anybody; it was just the natural thing. People are people and they shouldn't be rich and they shouldn't be poor. I just thought this was the way you live. You're supposed to be a socialist and ultimately the whole world goes socialist.

Tyler was a leading figure in the "Clarity caucus," organized around the revolutionary socialist magazine Socialist Clarity.

Tyler attended New York University on a scholarship in the early 1930s, where he became involved in left-wing political activities, including public speaking on street corners on behalf of the Young People's Socialist League (YPSL), the youth section of the Socialist Party. Upon graduating in 1932, Tyler briefly worked as a writer for the Yiddish-language socialist newspaper The Jewish Daily Forward. He also served as editor of Free Youth, one of the YPSL's short-lived publications of the early 1930s.

Tyler rose through the ranks of the YPSL, rising to the top leadership position in the group. This post gave Tyler a seat with top leaders of the adult party, making him a key leader in the bitter factional war that occupied the Socialist Party in that period. Tyler was a supporter of the so-called "Militant faction" of the Socialist Party against the older generation of party regulars known as the Old Guard and was later active in the far-left "Clarity caucus" after the Militants themselves fragmented.

Along with many on the American left, Tyler was a vigorous opponent of rearmament for a new World War, authoring a resolution which declared the Socialist Party would support no war except a war for socialism. In making this pronouncement Tyler reasoned that the distinction between democratic-capitalist and fascist countries would be essentially meaningless in the event of war since the militarization of society inherent in the act of going to war would reduce the democratic nations themselves to reactionary dictatorships.

Tyler declared that the only course for the Socialist Party was to organize the dissident forces created by a new war in order to "smash the capitalist system." He condemned the ongoing agitation for collective security against fascism being preached by the Communist Party and many liberals, as "asking the working class to sign a blanket check even before a war, endorsing support in the event of war."

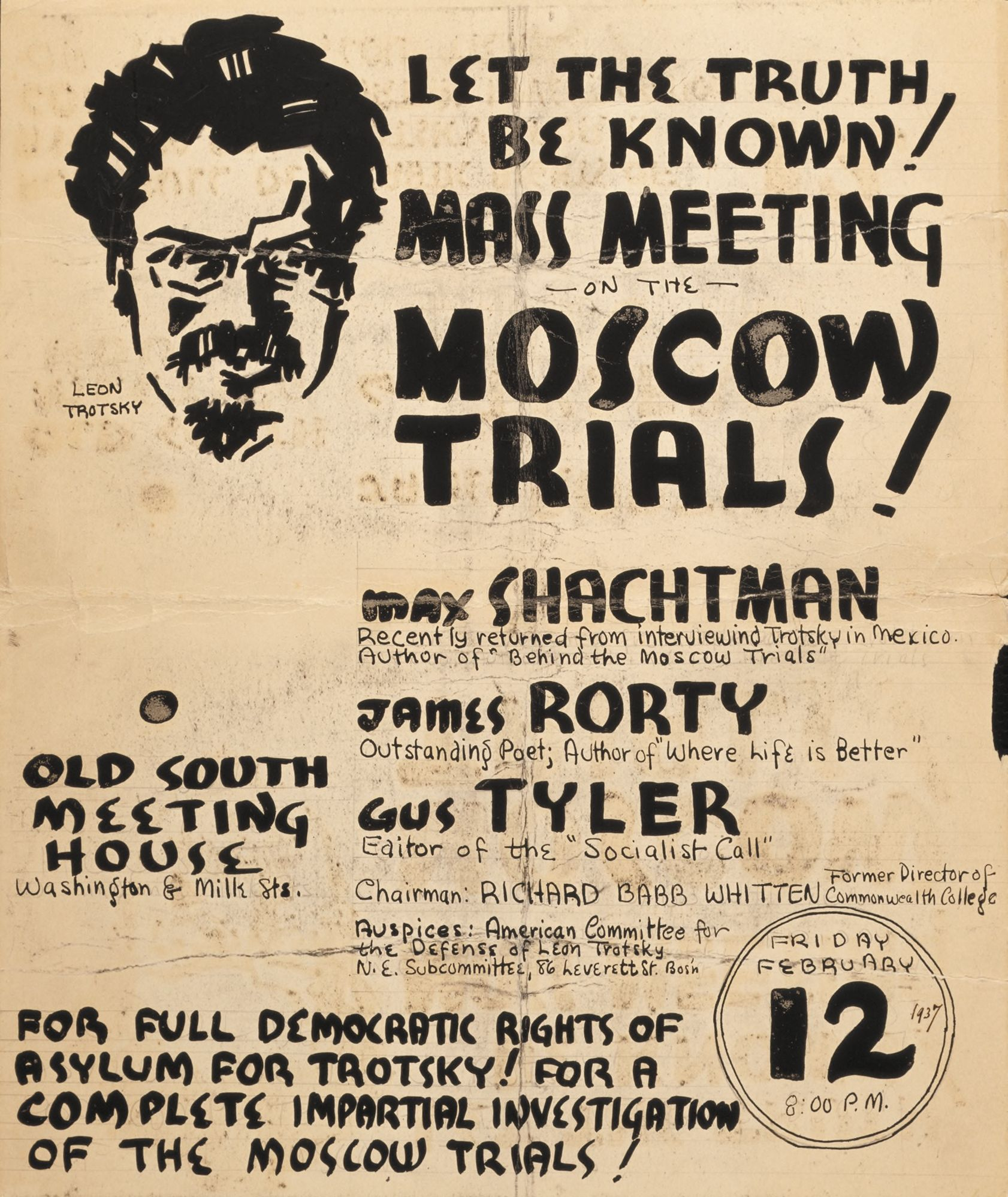
A poster advertising a mass meeting of the American Committee for the Defense of Leon Trotsky at the Old South Meeting House in Boston, Massachusetts, featuring Max Shachtman, James Rorty and Tyler, c. 1937

The Socialist Party imploded in a frenzy of factional warfare during the second half of the 1930s, with the party's Old Guard right wing leaving to form the Social Democratic Federation (established in 1936) and the Trotskyist left wing expelled en masse to form the Socialist Workers Party (established in 1938). With its membership and funds depleted, many activists in the Socialist Party were forced to turn their efforts elsewhere.

=== Union career ===
Tyler's intelligence and commitment seems to have caught the attention of International Ladies' Garment Workers' Union (ILGWU) president David Dubinsky. Despite the fact that Dubinsky was himself a stalwart of the Socialist Party's Old Guard, Tyler was offered a staff job with the ILGWU in its education department. Tyler held a succession of positions in the union rising in 1945 to the post of Assistant President, a position he held until his retirement in 1989.

In an autobiographic essay, Tyler once noted that his career in the ILGWU was interrupted by the war. "When I returned from my stint as an aerial gunner, I suggested to Dubinsky that the union create a full-time political department. He argued that no union had such a department. I told him he had a reputation as an innovator. He was flattered. I got the job."

Tyler later worked with the ILGWU's successor union, UNITE, as an assistant to the president, and for many years hosted his own radio program on station WEVD (a radio station owned by The Forward Association and named after Eugene Victor Debs) in New York.

When the English-language version of the Forward launched in 1990, Tyler began writing for the publication, penning a weekly column in the paper until 2006.

Tyler authored several works of historical scholarship, including a 1995 history of the International Ladies' Garment Workers' Union published by the noted academic publisher M. E. Sharpe. As a leading public intellectual, Tyler wrote prolifically. He continued to write a periodic column for The Jewish Daily Forward entitled "Tyler Too" well into his 90s.

=== Death and legacy ===
Gus Tyler died on June 3, 2011, in Sarasota, Florida, at the age of 99. He was survived by two children and three grandchildren.

Tyler, it was recalled in The New York Times at the time of his death, "tumbled through life like a Saul Bellow character, full of analytic thought and urban vitality. He wore multifarious hats: pamphleteer, professor and poet, but insisted on defining himself with a single word: agitator. ... His most powerful weapons were words, in books, newspaper columns, radio commentaries and speeches he wrote for labor chieftains."

Tyler's papers are included in several collections at the Kheel Center for Labor-Management Documentation and Archives at Cornell University in Ithaca, New York.

== Works ==
- The United Front. New York: Rand School Press, 1933.
- Life of Karl Marx. Chicago: Young People's Socialist League, Educational Dept., n.d. [c. 1934].
- An Outline of Socialist Economics. Chicago: Young People's Socialist League, Educational Dept., n.d. [1930s].
- The Elements of Revolutionary Socialism. Chicago: Educational Dept., Young People's Socialist League of America, n.d. [c. 1936].
- Youth Fights War! Chicago: Young Peoples Socialist League, n.d. [c. 1936].
- A New Philosophy for Labor. New York, Fund for the Republic, 1959.
- A Legislative Campaign for a Federal Minimum Wage, 1935. New York: Henry Holt, 1959.
- Organized Crime in America: A Book of Readings. Ann Arbor, University of Michigan Press, 1962.
- Combating Organized Crime. Philadelphia: American Academy of Political and Social Science, 1963.
- The Labor Revolution: Trade Unions in a New America. New York: Viking Press, 1967.
- The Political Imperative: The Corporate Character of Unions. New York: Macmillan, 1968.
- The Jewish Labor Movement: A Living Legacy. New York: Nathan Chanin Cultural Foundation, n.d. [1960s].
- Labor in the Metropolis. Columbus, OH: C.E. Merrill Publishing Co., 1972.
- Mexican-Americans Tomorrow: Educational and Economic Perspectives. Albuquerque: University of New Mexico Press, 1975.
- Scarcity: A Critique of the American Economy. New York: Quadrangle/New York Times Book Co., 1976.
- George Meany: The Making of a Freedom Fighter. New York: 85th Birthday Tribute to George Meany Committee, 1979.
- The Threat of Conservatism. With Peter Steinfels and Irving Howe. New York: Foundation for the Study of Independent Social Ideas, 1980.
- The Power of Money in American Politics. With Fred Wertheimer and David Cohen. New York: Aspen Institute for Humanisitc Studies, 1982.
- The Work Ethic: A Critical Analysis. With Jack Barbash, Robert J. Lampman, and Sar A. Levitan. Madison, WI: Industrial Relations Research Association, 1983.
- Look for the Union Label: A History of the International Ladies' Garment Workers' Union. Armonk, NY: M.E. Sharpe, 1995.
- A Vital Voice: 100 Years of the Jewish Forward. New York: Forward Association, 1997
