= Socialist Youth International =

The Socialist Youth International (in German: Sozialistische Jugend-Internationale, French: L'Internationale de la Jeunesse Socialiste) was an international union of socialist youth organisations. It was founded in August 1907 during the Second International's Stuttgart congress.

In 1923, the Young Workers' International and the International Community of Socialist Youth Organisations merged into the organisation at a meeting in Hamburg.

The headquarters of SYI were set up in Berlin. In 1933, it shifted to Prague, and in 1938 to Paris.

During the Second World War SYI became dormant. It was later replaced by the International Union of Socialist Youth.

== See also ==
- Estonian Young Socialist League
