= Youth March for Integrated Schools (1958) =

First of two Youth Marches that rallied in Washington, DC

- Part of the Civil Rights Movement
- Date: October 25, 1958
- Location: Lincoln Memorial in Washington, D.C.
- Caused by: Brown v. Board of Education (1954); Massive resistance
- Result: Estimated 10,000 people participate

The Youth March for Integrated Schools in 1958 was the first of two Youth Marches that rallied in Washington, D.C. The second took place the following year. On October 25, 1958, approximately 10,000 young people, mostly of high school to college age, marched to the Lincoln Memorial to promote the desegregation of American public schools. The event was organised by a committee led by A. Philip Randolph, a prominent civil rights activist, who published a statement detailing the purposes and motives for the demonstration. Randolph described the primary purpose as giving 'dramatization to the God-given right of every child, regardless of race or color, religion or national origin or ancestry, to receive an education in the public schools, free from the insult of segregation and discrimination.' He further requested that a delegation led by Harry Belafonte, consisting of five white members and six black members of the Youth March, meet with President Eisenhower to promote the desegregation of schools; however, this delegation was blocked.

Martin Luther King Jr. was expected to speak at the event, but was recuperating from a chest stabbing inflicted by Izola Curry that left him severely wounded. Although unable to attend, King positively suggested that "such a project will do much to give courage, support and encouragement to our [beleaguered] children and adults in the south. Simultaneously it will have a profound moral effect upon the nation and world opinion." At the event, King's wife Coretta Scott King delivered a speech on his behalf.

== See also ==
- List of protest marches on Washington, D.C.
