= Carleton Beals =

American journalist, author, and crusader

- Born: November 13, 1893; Medicine Lodge, Kansas, U.S.
- Died: April 4, 1979 (aged 85); Hartford County, Connecticut, U.S.
- Education: University of California, Berkeley; Columbia University
- Occupations: Journalist, book author, historian, political activist
- Notable credit: The only foreign journalist who interviewed General Augusto Sandino during Nicaragua's 1927–33 war against US military occupation
- Spouse: Lilian Beals
- Relatives: Carrie Nation (grandmother)

Carleton Beals (November 13, 1893 – April 4, 1979) was an American journalist, writer, historian, and political activist with a special interest in Latin America. A major journalistic coup for him was his interview with the Nicaraguan rebel Augusto Sandino in February 1928. In the 1920s he was part of the cosmopolitan group of intellectuals, artists, and journalists in Mexico City. He remained an active, prolific, and politically engaged leftist journalist and is the subject of a scholarly biography.

== Early life and education ==
Beals was born in Medicine Lodge, Kansas. His father, Leon Eli Beals, lawyer and journalist, was the stepson of Carrie Nation, the temperance movement advocate. His mother was Elvina Sybilla Blickensderfer. His brother, Ralph Leon Beals, was the first anthropologist at University of California, Los Angeles.

The family moved from Kansas when Beals was age three, and he attended school in Pasadena, California. After graduating from high school in 1911, he worked a variety of jobs while attending the University of California, Berkeley, where he studied engineering and mining. He won the Bonnheim Essay Prize and the Bryce History Essay Prize. After graduating in 1916, cum laude, he attended Columbia University on a graduate scholarship, earning a master's degree in 1917.

== Career ==
[Beals] is now the best informed and the most awkward living writer on Latin America. (Time, April 25, 1938)

—

Unable to find work as a writer, Beals took a job with Standard Oil Company, but it did not suit him. In 1918, he spent a brief period of time in jail as a World War I draft evader. Upon release, he decided to go see the world, and with what little money he had, Beals and his wife Lillian drove to Mexico. There, he founded the English Preparatory Institute in 1919, taught at the American High School during 1919 to 1920, and was on the personal staff of President Carranza (1920). They left Mexico in 1921 for Europe where Beals studied at the University of Madrid, and then the University of Rome. Back in Mexico, he became a correspondent for The Nation, separated from his wife, and became romantically involved with photographer Tina Modotti's sister, Mercedes.

In February 1928, Oswald Garrison Villard, editor of The Nation, sent Beals to Nicaragua to write a series of articles. He became notable as the only foreign journalist who interviewed General Augusto Sandino during Nicaragua's 1927–33 war against US military occupation.

I have done most of my writing in Spain, Italy, Mexico and Peru, and in this country, chiefly in New York, later in Guilford, Connecticut, since 1957 in Killingworth. (C. Beals)

—

In all, Beals wrote over 200 magazine articles for publications such as the New Republic and Harper's Magazine. Beals also wrote more than 45 books, including on history, geography, and travel. Some of his books are written for a juvenile audience. His autobiography, Glass Houses, was published by J.B. Lippincott Company in 1938. In 1931, Beals was awarded the John Simon Guggenheim Memorial Foundation Fellowship for biographies. His biography subjects included Porfirio Díaz, Huey P. Long, Roberto de la Selva, Stephen F. Austin, John Eliot, Carrie Nation, and Leon Trotsky.

During his career, Beals witnessed Mexican revolutions, lectured on Shakespeare, and was held incommunicado by a Mexican general. His travels took him to French Morocco, Tunisia, Algiers, Greece, Turkey, the Soviet Union, Germany, and the Caribbean. He was a Ford Hall Forum speaker in 1936, and a member of the American Committee for the Defense of Leon Trotsky in 1937. The following year, Time magazine called Beals, "the best informed and the most awkward living writer on Latin America."

== Later life ==
During the 1960s, he supported the Fair Play for Cuba Committee. Beals was a hero to the young people of Cuba.

== Selected works ==
- 1921, The Mexican as He Is
- 1922, Magdalene of Michoacan
- 1923, Rome or Death; the Story of Fascism
- 1923, Mexico; an Interpretation (Agrarian land reform in Mexico)
- 1925, Tasks Awaiting President Calles of Mexico
- 1926, The Church Problem in Mexico
- 1927, Brimstone and Chili: A Book of Personal Experiences in the Southwest and in Mexico
- 1929, Mexico's New Leader
- 1929, Destroying Victor
- 1930, The Coming Struggle for Latin America
- 1931, Mexican Maze, with illustrations by Diego Rivera
- 1932, Porfirio Díaz. Dictator of Mexico
- 1932, Banana Gold
- 1933, The Crime of Cuba, with photographs by Walker Evans
- 1934, Fire on the Andes
- 1934, Black River
- 1935, Rifle Rule in Cuba
- 1935, The Story of Huey P. Long
- 1936, The Stones Awake: A Novel of Mexico
- 1936, Prologue to Cuban Freedom
- 1937, America South
- 1937, The New Genre of Roberto de la Selva
- 1937, The Drug Eaters of the High Andes
- 1938, Glass Houses, Ten Years of Free-Lancing
- 1939, American Earth; the Biography of a Nation
- 1939, The Coming Struggle for Latin America
- 1940, Pan America
- 1943, Dawn over the Amazon
- 1948, Lands of the Dawning Morrow: The Awakening from Rio Grande to Cape Horn
- 1949, The Long Land: Chile
- 1953, First Men of America
- 1953, Stephen F. Austin, Father of Texas
- 1955, Our Yankee Heritage: New England's Contribution to American Civilization
- 1956, Adventure of the Western Sea, illustrated by Jacob Landau
- 1956, Taste of Glory; a Novel
- 1957, John Eliot, the Man Who Loved the Indians (July 31, 1604 – May 20, 1690)
- 1958, House in Mexico
- 1960, Cuba's Revolution: The First Year
- 1960, Brass-Knuckle Crusade; the Great Know-Nothing Conspiracy, 1820–1860
- 1961, Nomads and Empire Builders; Native Peoples and Cultures of South America
- 1962, Cyclone Carry, the Story of Carry Nation
- 1963, Latin America: World in Revolution
- 1963, Eagles of the Andes: South American Struggles for Independence
- 1965, War Within a War; the Confederacy Against Itself
- 1967, Land of the Mayas; Yesterday and Today
- 1968, The Great Revolt and Its Leaders: The History of Popular American Uprisings in the 1890s
- 1969, The Case of Leon Trotsky [Lev Davydovič Trockij]: Report of Hearings On the Charges Made Against Him in the Moscow Trails
- 1970, Stories Told by the Aztecs Before the Spaniards Came
- 1970, The Nature of Revolution
- 1970, Great Guerrilla Warriors
- 1970, Colonial Rhode Island
- 1973, The Incredible Incas: Yesterday and Today
