= Youth March for Integrated Schools (1959) =

Second of two Youth Marches that rallied in Washington, D.C.

- Part of the Civil Rights Movement
- Date: April 18, 1959
- Location: National Sylvan Theater in Washington, D.C.
- Caused by: Brown v. Board of Education (1954); Massive resistance; Youth March for Integrated Schools (1958)
- Result: Estimated 26,000 people participate

Youth March for Integrated Schools was the second of two Youth Marches that rallied in Washington, D.C. The second march occurred on April 18, 1959, at the National Sylvan Theater and was attended by an estimated 26,000 individuals. The march was a follow-up to the first Youth March to demonstrate support for ongoing efforts to end racially segregated schools in the United States. Speeches were delivered by Martin Luther King Jr., A. Philip Randolph, Roy Wilkins, and Charles S. Zimmerman. Other civil rights leaders that spoke at this event included Daisy Bates, Harry Belafonte and Jackie Robinson. Martin Luther King Jr. delivered a speech and stated, "What this march demonstrates to me, above all else, is that you young people, through your own experience, have somehow discovered the central fact of American life that the extension of democracy for all Americans depends upon complete integration of Negro Americans." This demonstrated why the march was so important.

To rally citizens together for this march, flyers were posted titled, "Why We March". This flyer stated, "We march to protest the century-long mistreatment of Negor citizens. They have waited long enough. We march to demand real democracy--now!" Information regarding this march was also published in a 1992 book collecting Martin Luther King's work titled The Papers of Martin Luther King, where King describes how important it was that the youth were the ones participating and leading this march in order to make a difference. This march would show how much it meant to the African American youth to fight for integrated schools.

== See also ==
- List of protest marches on Washington, D.C.
- Bibliography of Martin Luther King Jr.
