= Harry Fleischman =

American socialist activist, writer and biographer (1914–2004)

- Born: 3 October 1914; The Bronx, New York City, United States
- Died: 7 November 2004 (aged 90); Manhattan, New York City, United States
- Occupations: Political activist, author
- Known for: Socialist Party leadership, biographer of Norman Thomas
- Spouses: Natalie Wiencek (m. 1937; died 1989); Ethel Kahn (m. 1994)
- Children: 3

Harry Fleischman (3 October 1914 – 7 November 2004) was an American socialist activist, labor rights advocate and author. He was executive secretary of the Socialist Party of America during the 1940s and wrote a biography of Norman Thomas in 1964.

== Early life ==
Fleischman was born in the Bronx to Jewish immigrant, working-class parents. As a teenager he became active in the labor movement. Fleischman lost his first job in a wire hanger factory after attempting to organize a union, and later successfully organized a strike in a window-blind factory. He was drawn to moderate socialist electoral politics during the Great Depression, rather than to the Communist Party USA.

== Political and labor activism ==
Fleischman became national secretary of the Socialist Party of America in 1942, holding the position until 1950. He also served as campaign manager for Norman Thomas during the 1944 and 1948 presidential campaigns. During the Second World War, Fleischman was active in the Workers Defense League (WDL), which defended union rights, civil liberties, and racial equality.

In 1964 his book Norman Thomas: A Biography was published. It received praise from Upton Sinclair for its depiction of American social and political life. He also authored Let's Be Human (1960), a collection of columns on civil rights and human relations.

Fleischman worked as labour editor for Voice of America and directed the American Jewish Committee's National Labor Service between 1953 and 1979. He also frequently advocated civil liberties during the McCarthy era.

== Later life and death ==
In later years, Fleischman chaired the WDL for more than two decades, supporting racial integration in labor and expanding the organization's reach to new social movements. He was associated with the Democratic Socialists of America, contributing regularly to its magazine Democratic Left.

Fleischman died of cancer at his son's home in Manhattan on 7 November 2004, aged 90. He was survived by his second wife, Ethel Kahn, three children from his first marriage and three stepchildren.
