= Szabad ifjúság =

Szabad ifjúság, October 29, 1956

Szabad ifjúság (Hungarian pronunciation: [ˈsɒbɒd ˈifjuːʃaːɡ], 'Free Youth') was a Hungarian newspaper, and the organ of the Union of Working Youth. Szabad ifjúság began publishing on March 3, 1950. It was published weekly from October 1950 to July 1951, and daily from August 1951 to October 1956. It was later replaced by Magyar ifjúság.
