= Heresy, Yes—Conspiracy, No =

1953 book by Sidney Hook

- Title page for Heresy, Yes Conspiracy, No (1953)
- Author: Sidney Hook
- Language: English
- Subject: Academic freedom
- Genre: Non-fiction
- Published: May 1953
- Publisher: John Day Company
- Publication place: United States
- Media type: Print
- Pages: 283

Heresy, Yes—Conspiracy, No is a book by New York University philosophy professor Sidney Hook published in May 1953 about conflicts between support for communism and for academic freedom in the United States.

== History ==
The book began as a full-page article in The New York Times Magazine called "Heresy, Yes—But Conspiracy, No," published on July 9, 1950.

After the formation of the American Committee for Cultural Freedom, spearheaded by Hook, he had the group publish a 29-page pamphlet with the slightly-varied title Heresy, Yes—Conspiracy, No!.

== Content ==
=== Dedication ===
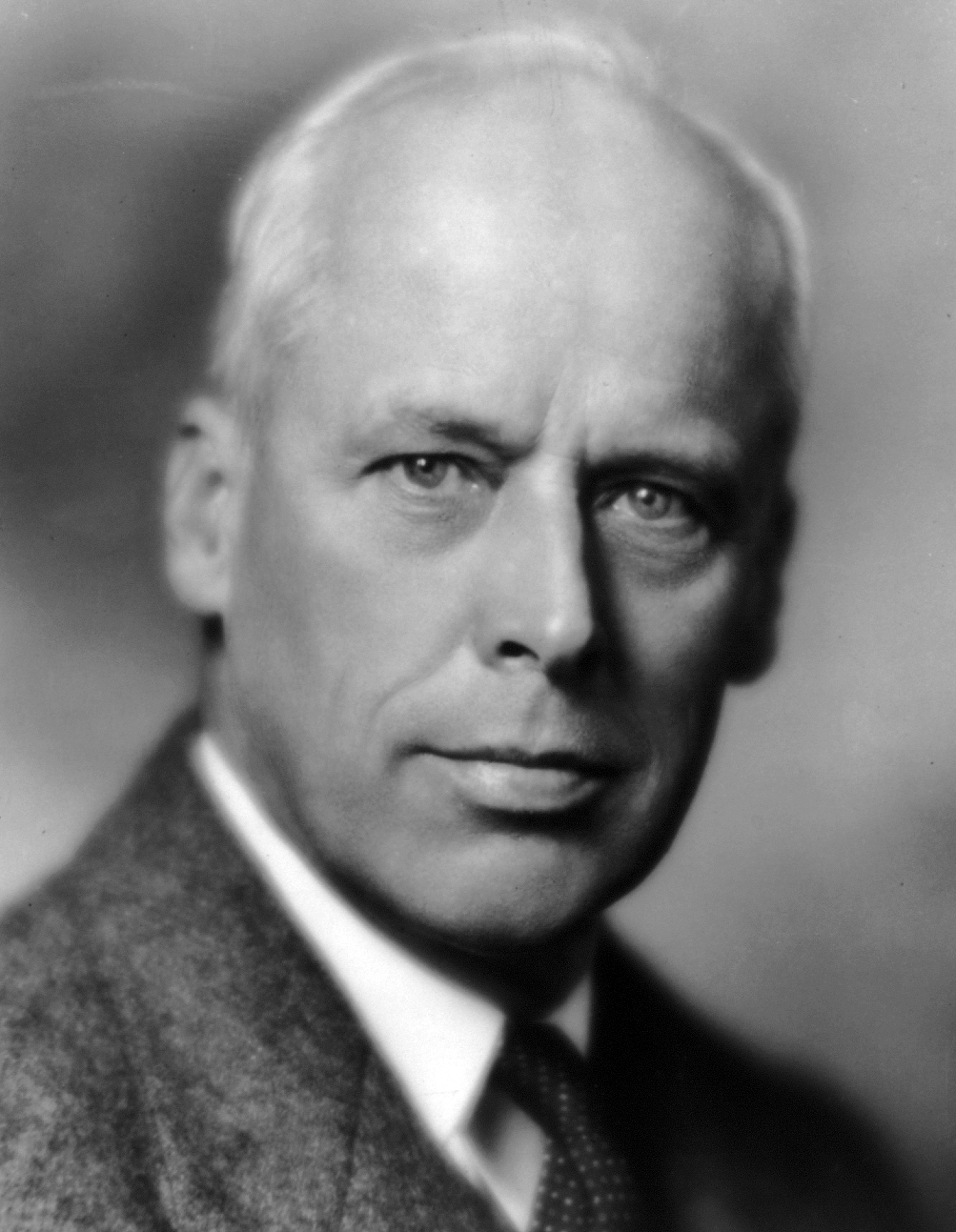
Norman Thomas, leader of the Socialist Party of America, frequent candidate for U.S. President, and a long-time friend of Hook

Hook dedicated the book to the following:

- "Norman Thomas: American heretic and democrat
- "Horace M. Kallen: American individualist—cultural pluralist"

=== Chapters ===
The book's comprise a number of essay written by Hook between 1950 (the original article) and the book's May 1953 publication date. Hook had published various chapters earlier in The New York Times, Commentary, The Journal of Philosophy, The Journal of Higher Education, The American Mercury, School and Society (1939-1946, a journal edited by William Bagley), The Saturday Evening Post, and The New Leader.

(Possible or same-name sources, derived from cross-check with Hook's papers, appear below in parentheses):

Introduction

1. Heresy and Conspiracy ("Heresy, Yes, But Conspiracy, No," in The New York Times Magazine, 9 July 1950)
2. Cultural Vigilantism ("The Dangers in 'Cultural Vigilantism'" in The New York Times Magazine, 30 September 1951)
3. Freedom in American Culture ("Freedom in American Culture" in The New Leader, 6 April 1953)
4. What is "Guilt by Association"? ("What Is 'Guilt by Association'?" in The American Mercury, November 1952)
5. Reflections on the Smith Act ("Does the Smith Act Threaten Our Liberties?" in Commentary, January 1953)
6. Authoritarianism in Education ("The Danger of Authoritarian Attitudes in Teaching Today" in School and Society, 20 January 1951)
7. The Vocation of the Teacher ("The Job of the Teacher in Days of Crisis" in The New York Times Magazine, 14 December 1952)
8. The Case for Academic Freedom ("Cultural Freedom and Starving Men: A Case for Democracy" in Bharat Jyoti, 16 March 16, 1952)
9. Academic Freedom and Communism ("Academic Freedom and Communism" in The New York Times Magazine, 27 March 1949)
10. Complexities and Rejoinders
11. Academic Freedom and Academic Integrity ("Academic Integrity and Academic Freedom" in Commentary, October 1949)
12. A Positive Proposal

=== Approach ===
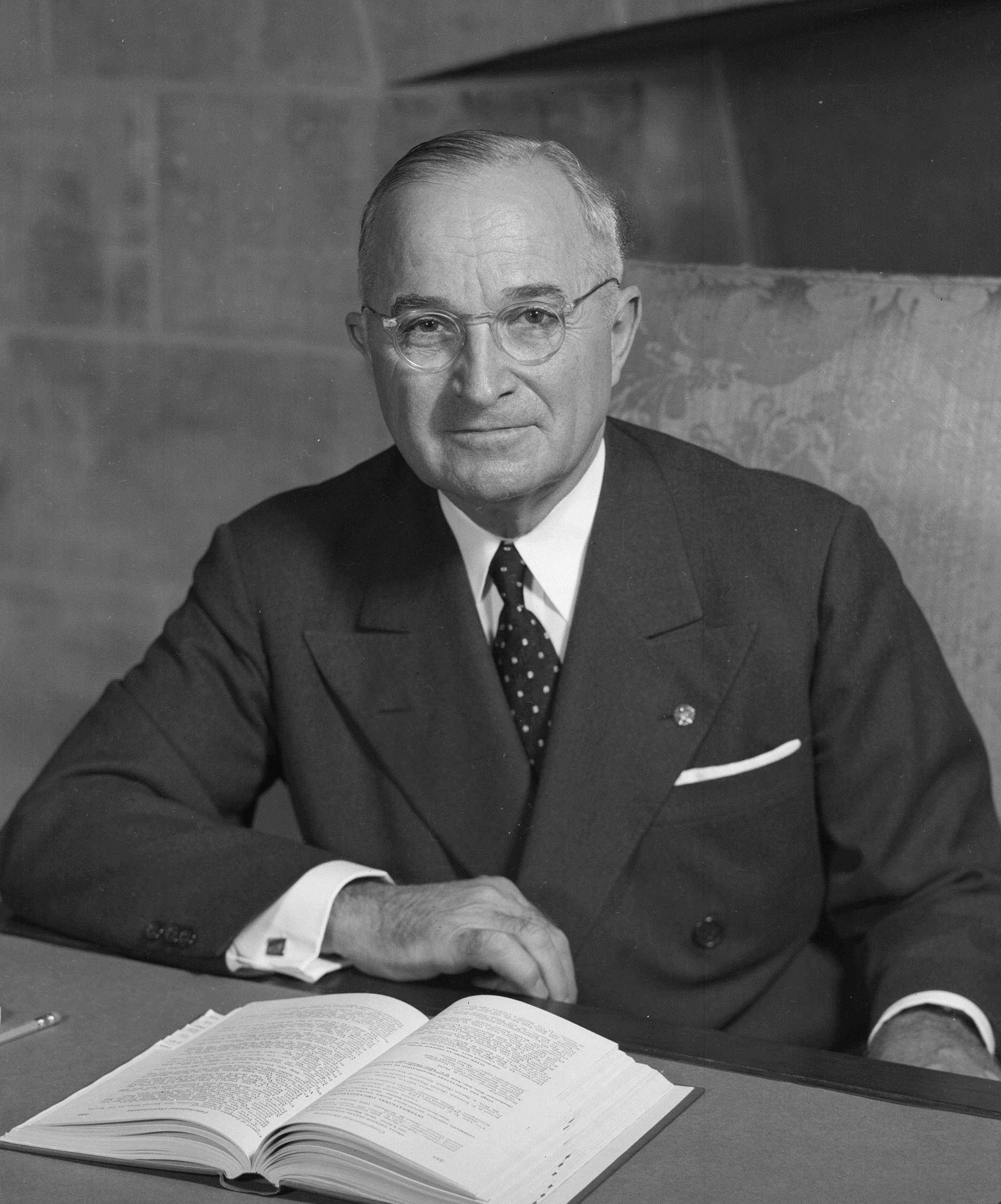
Hook criticized US President Harry S. Truman (official portrait)

Hook sets out to deal with academic freedom, a topic "bound to displease two articulate groups whose influence is out of all proportion to their numbers":

- "Cultural Vigilantes," who have "exaggerated the threat of communism as a domestic danger" and use fear of Communism "to discredit opponents of their pet aversion or panacea," whatever that may be. They use a common fallacy ("the undistributed middle term") to insinuate that any who does not join them in attacking Communist is therefore a Communist sympathizer (a with us or against us-type argument).
- "Ritualistic Liberals," who "dismiss too lightly the threat of conspiratorial character of the Communist movement" and who have "invented malicious legends about the state of political freedom in this country which fits the Communist picture of a nation under the iron heel of terror."

Compounding conflicts between these two groups, Hook notes, are government officials who suffer from either "mediocre intelligence" or the "most extraordinary ignorance of the nature of the international Communist movement," an example of whose decisions are the Truman Doctrine (i.e., Hook is criticizing New Deal/Fair Deal officials under Roosevelt and Harry S. Truman).

=== Quotes ===
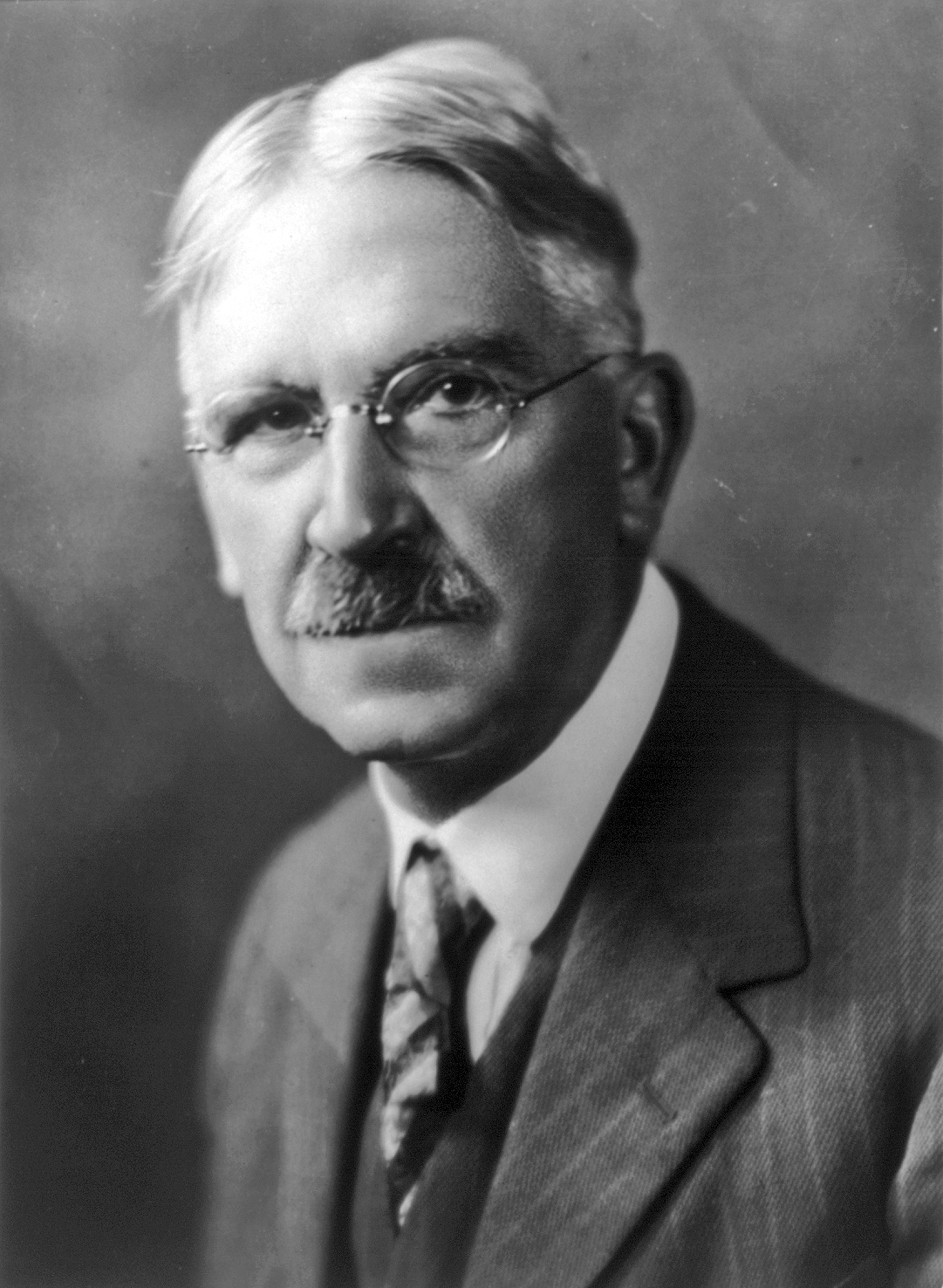
Hook quotes John Dewey, his mentor

Hook divided the book into two parts, each of which begins with quotes from his choice of most relevant examples:

- Part I:
  - Socrates: "...The unexamined life is not worth living.." (from Plato's Apology of Socrates)
  - John Dewey:
    The democratic idea of freedom is not the right of each individual to do as he pleases, even if it be qualified by adding 'provided he does not interfere with the same freedom on the part of others.' While the idea is not always, not often enough, expressed in words, the basic freedom is that of freedom of mind and of whatever degree of freedom of action and experience is necessary to produce freedom of intelligence."
- Part II: New School Bulletin (1953):
  The New School knows that no man can teach well, nor should he be permitted to teach at all unless he is prepared "to follow the truth of scholarship wherever it may lead." No inquiry is ever made as to whether a lecturer's private views are conservative, liberal, or radical; orthodox or agnostic; views of the aristocrat or commoner. Jealously safeguarding this precious principle, the New School stoutly affirms that a member of any political party or group which asserts the right to dictate in matters of science or scientific opinion is not free to teach the truth and is thereby disqualified as a teacher. Equally, the New School holds that discrimination on grounds of race, religion or country of origin either among teachers or students runs counter to every profession of freedom and has no place in American education. (New School Bulletin, Vol. 10, No. 19, 5 January 1953)
  (Hook quoted the bulletin again for his posthumously published essay "The Principles and Problems of Academic Freedom," written for a symposium at Stony Brook University circa 8 May 1984 and included in the posthumous book Convictions, published in 1990).

=== Conclusion ===
Hook concludes:

The chief evil from which the schools suffer is not communism but community neglect, and the failure to make the common and special needs of the individual personality their supreme concern. Whatever the responsibilities of the schools to a democratic society, the responsibilities of a democratic society to its schools are more basic and more numerous. These responsibilities have not been adequately discharged. The need for more schools and better schools, more teachers and better teachers and better-paid teachers, grows. The perennial need for educational thinking, for a continuously held philosophy of education, has become more acute in the long war for survival and freedom into which we have already entered. The task of American educators is to integrate the insights of liberal thinkers from Socrates to John Dewey, as well as the insights born of wider scientific knowledge, into a coherent philosophy to make the practice of education meaningful, excellent, joyful, and free.

== Reception ==
In 1953, Robert E. Fitch wrote in Commentary that Hook's book showed "balance and reasonableness" and also its "courage" for including teachers themselves in its criticisms. It includes a "sharp indictment" of the American Association of University Professors' Committee on Academic Freedom and Tenure for what Fitch calls its "failure to cope realistically with the problem of Communist infiltration." Fitch agrees with Hook that Communist affiliation means "active participation in a conspiracy" and thereby renders a teacher "unfit" to teach. He notes Hook's assertion that "college and university teachers constituted the strongest and most influential group of Communist fellow-travelers in the United States" and agrees with Hook's recommendation that such teachers receive individual care and consideration.

In 1980, Victor Navasky acknowledged Hook as the "most articulate proponent" of the "doctrine of conspiracy" of the Communist Party USA. He called the book a "bible for liberals unwilling to fight for the rights of Communists."

In 1997, Christopher Phelps wrote, "Hook was a leading figure in the creation of a repressive, censorious atmosphere in higher education, carried out, naturally, under the guise of cultural freedom." Further, he stated that his book "became perhaps the most influential justification for firing Communists and suspected Communists from university and schools in the early 1950s..." He noted that, despite an effort at even-handedness, in fact Hook sided with "Cultural Vigilantes" and wound up criticizing them not for their understanding of Communism but their "blundering methods" of eradicating it from school.

In 2004, Matthew J. Cotter argued appreciation for the nuance of Hook's position. Hook had recommended suspension, not removal of teachers once their Party membership became known, followed by inquiry. However, Cotter challenges Hook's "exaggerated sense of threat posed by Communist conspiracy among American teachers. If one accepts Hook's premise that Communist conspiracy did involve some American teachers, then Cotter deemed Hook's approach to have "no democratic failing." Hook clearly called for a third of four steps in his process of inquiry, such that prima facie evidence of Communist Party membership should not result in automatic dismissal." In this analysis, Cotter notes his own agreement with similar findings by Robert Talisse.

In 2015, Edward S. Shapiro commented, "The bulk of Hook's writings in the 1950s, most notably Heresy, Yes—Conspiracy, No! (1953), sought to undo the damage done by McCarthyism."

In his memoir Out of Step, Hook wrote: "Even though I believed that membership in the [CP] rendered an individual unfit... to be a member of the teaching staff, I did not believe that the mere fact of membership should result in automatic dismissal."
