= Dean Urdahl =

American politician (born 1949)

Member of the Minnesota House of Representatives from the 16A district 18B (2003–2013), 18A (2013–2022)
- In office January 7, 2003 – January 14, 2025
- Preceded by: redrawn district
- Succeeded by: Scott Van Binsbergen

Personal details
- Born: August 18, 1949 (age 77)
- Party: Republican
- Spouse: Karen
- Children: 3
- Education: St. Cloud State University
- Occupation: educator, author, legislator

Dean L. Urdahl (born August 18, 1949) is an American politician who served in the Minnesota House of Representatives from 2003 to 2025. A member of the Republican Party of Minnesota, Urdahl represented District 16A in central Minnesota, which includes the cities of Litchfield and Montevideo, Renville County, and parts of Chippewa, Kandiyohi, and Meeker Counties. He is a retired teacher and coach.

== Early life, education, and career ==
Urdahl grew up in Litchfield, Minnesota. His roots run deep in the area: his ancestors helped settle Litchfield Township in 1856. He graduated from Litchfield High School and St. Cloud State University, earning a B.S. in social studies. He got his start in politics working on U.S. Representative John Zwach's campaign staff in 1970.

Urdahl was an American history teacher and coach in the New London-Spicer School District from 1971 to 2006. He has served on the Minnesota Education in Agriculture Leadership Council, the Minnesota Commission on Public Service Reform, and the Minnesota State Board of Nursing. In July 2008, he was appointed as the Minnesota representative to the Abraham Lincoln Bicentennial Commission. In 2012 Urdahl was named co-chair of the Minnesota Civil War Sesquicentennial Task Force.

Urdahl has written a book about former members of the Minnesota Twins baseball team and another about famous Minnesotans. He has written four books of historical fiction set in Minnesota during the Dakota War of 1862. Urdahl also wrote two historical novels about Minnesota's soldiers in the American Civil War, concentrating on the war's western theater.

Urdahl married Karen Frantti in 1971. They have three sons and 11 grandchildren. He is a Lutheran.

== Minnesota House of Representatives ==
Urdahl ran as the Independent-Republican Party candidate for the Minnesota House of Representatives District 15B in 1992 and 1994, losing to incumbent Roger Cooper. In 1996, he ran in the Republican primary for District 15B, losing to Drew Hultgren.

Urdahl was elected to the House in 2002, after incumbent Gary Kubly retired, and was reelected every two years until his retirement in 2024. In 2011-12 and 2015–16 he chaired the Legacy Division, which oversees funds raised by the Clean Water, Land and Legacy Amendment to the Minnesota Constitution. During the 2017-18 legislative session, Urdahl chaired the Capital Investment Committee. He later served as the minority lead on the Capital Investment Committee and sat on the Education Policy Committee.

Urdahl was instrumental in obtaining funding for the Minnesota State Capitol restoration and was named to serve on the Capitol Restoration Commission his committee established.

== Electoral history ==
2002 Minnesota State House - District 18B
Party	Candidate	Votes	%
Republican	Dean Urdahl	8,757	52.60
Democratic (DFL)	Mari Urness Pokornowski	6,527	39.21
Constitution	Phillip Jarman	1,324	7.95
Write-in		40	0.24
Total votes		16,648	100.0
Republican gain from Democratic (DFL)			

2004 Minnesota State House - District 18B
Party	Candidate	Votes	%
Republican	Dean Urdahl	11,079	55.82
Democratic (DFL)	David Detert	8,760	44.14
Write-in		7	0.04
Total votes		19,846	100.0
Republican hold			

2006 Minnesota State House - District 18B
Party	Candidate	Votes	%
Republican	Dean Urdahl	8,860	52.92
Democratic (DFL)	David Detert	7,869	47.00
Write-in		12	0.07
Total votes		16,741	100.0
Republican hold			

2008 Minnesota State House - District 18B
Party	Candidate	Votes	%
Republican	Dean Urdahl	11,813	58.65
Democratic (DFL)	David Detert	8,296	41.19
Write-in		31	0.15
Total votes		20,140	100.0
Republican hold			

2010 Minnesota State House - District 18B
Party	Candidate	Votes	%
Republican	Dean Urdahl	10,062	64.36
Democratic (DFL)	Darrin Anderson	5,545	35.47
Write-in		27	0.17
Total votes		15,634	100.0
Republican hold			

2012 Minnesota State House - District 18A
Party	Candidate	Votes	%
Republican	Dean Urdahl	11,744	58.28
Democratic (DFL)	Nancy Larson	8,372	41.55
Write-in		35	0.17
Total votes		20,151	100.0
Republican hold			

2014 Minnesota State House - District 18A
Party	Candidate	Votes	%
Republican	Dean Urdahl	9,965	67.22
Democratic (DFL)	Steven Schiroo	4,808	32.43
Write-in		52	0.35
Total votes		14,825	100.0
Republican hold			

2016 Minnesota State House - District 18A
Party	Candidate	Votes	%
Republican	Dean Urdahl	17,787	97.81
Write-in		399	2.19
Total votes		18,186	100.0
Republican hold			

2018 Minnesota State House - District 18A
Party	Candidate	Votes	%
Republican	Dean Urdahl	11,884	69.19
Democratic (DFL)	Justin Vold	4,269	24.85
Reform	Kyle Greene	650	3.78
Libertarian	Jill Galvan	363	2.11
Write-in		11	0.06
Total votes		17,177	100.0
Republican hold			

2020 Minnesota State House - District 18A
Party	Candidate	Votes	%
Republican	Dean Urdahl	19,594	97.59
Write-in		483	2.41
Total votes		20,077	100.0
Republican hold			

2022 Minnesota State House - District 16A
Party	Candidate	Votes	%
Republican	Dean Urdahl	12,986	73.27
Democratic (DFL)	Robert M. Wright	4,714	26.60
Write-in		24	0.14
Total votes		17,724	100.0
Republican hold			
