= Robert B. Talisse =

American philosopher (born 1970)

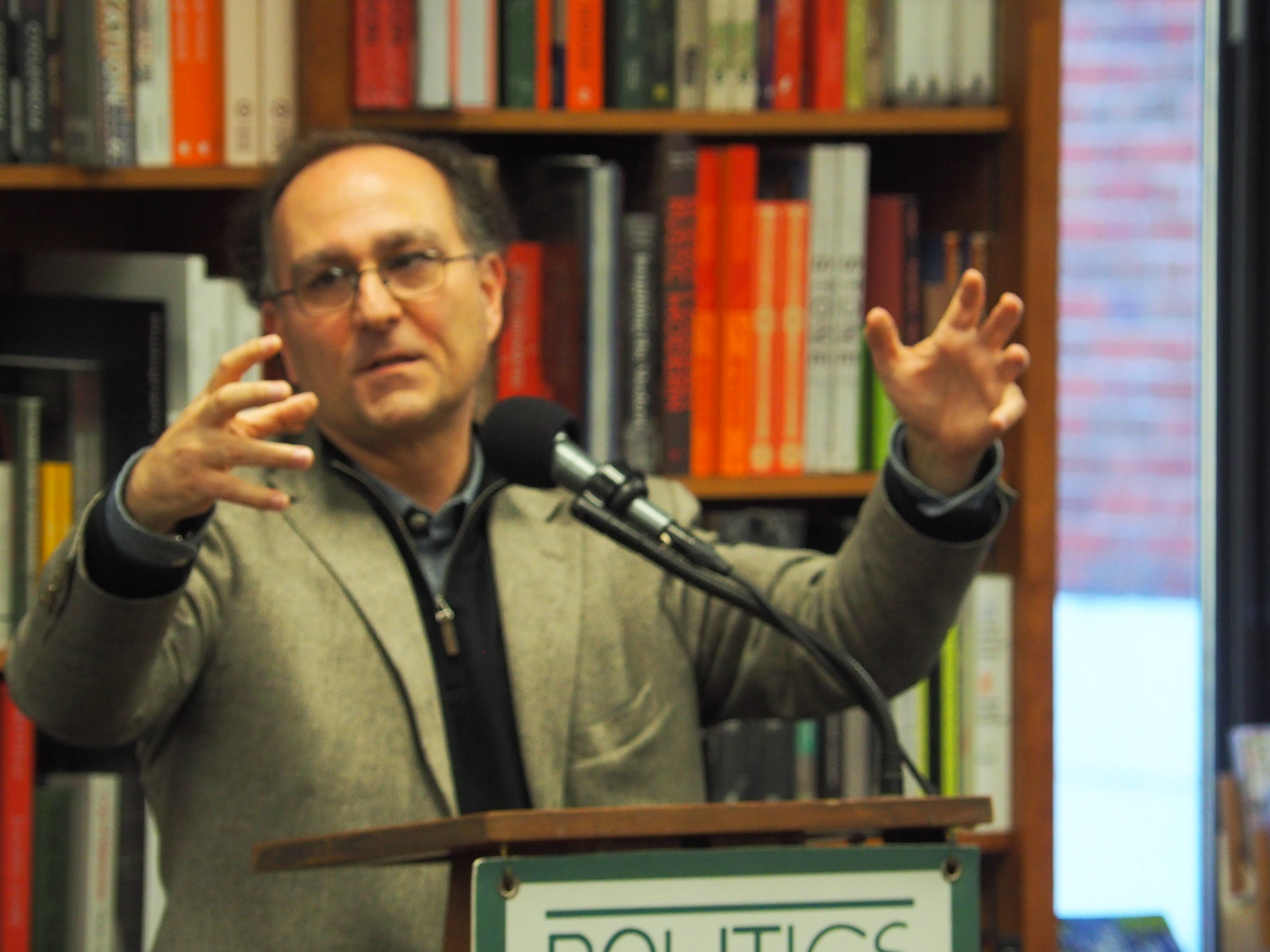
- Born: Robert Basil Talisse; January 9, 1970 (age 56); New Jersey, U.S.

Education
- Education: William Paterson University (BA); New York University (MA); CUNY Graduate Center (PhD)
- Doctoral advisor: Peter L. Phillips Simpson

Philosophical work
- Era: Contemporary philosophy
- Region: Western philosophy
- School: Analytic philosophy Pragmatism
- Institutions: Vanderbilt University
- Main interests: Democratic theory; epistemology; argumentation theory
- Notable ideas: Folk epistemology, weak man fallacy

Robert Basil Talisse (/ˈtælɪs/; born 1970) is an American philosopher and political theorist. He is currently Professor of Philosophy and former Chair of the Philosophy Department at Vanderbilt University in Nashville, Tennessee, where he is also a Professor of Political Science. Talisse is a former editor of the academic journal Public Affairs Quarterly, and a regular contributor to the blog 3 Quarks Daily, where he posts a monthly column with his frequent co-author and fellow Vanderbilt philosopher Scott Aikin. He earned his PhD in Philosophy from the Graduate Center of the City University of New York in 2001. His principal area of research is political philosophy, with an emphasis on democratic theory and liberalism.

== Research ==
Talisse's philosophical work tends to employ the idiom of pragmatism, though his recent writings seem aimed at criticizing much of that tradition. Talisse is especially keen to object to the political philosophies of John Dewey, Richard Rorty, and Richard Posner. Talisse's 2007 book, A Pragmatist Philosophy of Democracy, is in large part a criticism of Deweyan Democracy. As Dewey is often regarded as the most important pragmatist philosopher, the book and related articles have stimulated several critical replies and a symposium issue of the leading journal in pragmatist philosophy, Transactions of the Charles S. Peirce Society. Talisse's contention is that Deweyan Democracy is incompatible with a due recognition of what John Rawls called "the fact of reasonable pluralism," which is the fact that several different views of the good life exist and persist among free persons. Deweyan Democracy, Talisse contends, is based on the idea that all social institutions should be designed to realize but one conception of the good life; Deweyan Democracy is consequently unfit as a model of modern democracy. In place of Deweyan Democracy, Talisse presents a view he allies with Charles Sanders Peirce according to which the epistemic processes of inquiry and reasoning supply sufficient grounds for democracy. Talisse's view is hence properly regarded as a species of deliberative democracy. In drawing on Peirce, Talisse is allied with Cheryl Misak of the University of Toronto, who argues for a similar view. Talisse and Misak are commonly discussed and criticized together, as proposing a single kind of view generally known as "Peircean Democracy." The view proposed by Talisse and Misak is also sometimes called "pragmatist political liberalism." Talisse is also known as a proponent of epistemic democracy, the view according to which part of the justification for democracy lies in its ability to produce collective decisions that are in some sense true or correct. He has also published several articles criticizing the value pluralism associated with Isaiah Berlin, William Galston, and John Gray; his 2012 book, Pluralism and Liberal Politics is devoted to these debates.

=== Folk epistemology ===
In his later writings, Talisse has downplayed the pragmatist roots of his views, and instead attempted to devise a deliberative democratic theory from what he calls "folk epistemology". The idea is that there are epistemic norms which govern epistemic agents simply in virtue of the fact that they hold beliefs. One such norm is that we take what we believe to be true, and therefore tend to see the falsity of a statement to be a decisive reason against believing it. Talisse argues that the truth norm of belief can be shown to imply additional norms of belief, and that once these norms are identified, they can be seen to provide compelling reasons for epistemic agents to uphold the social and political norms of democracy. Talisse's surprising conclusion is that our most basic reasons to be democrats, it seems, are epistemological and not moral. Given the epistemological nature of Talisse's democratic theory, his work tends to engage questions about public discourse, argumentation, the media, and public ignorance.

=== Informal logic ===
Talisse has also contributed to contemporary discussions in informal logic. In a paper published in 2006 titled "Two Forms of the Straw Man", Talisse and Aikin proposed an original analysis of a new form of the straw man fallacy, what they called the weak man fallacy. In the traditional straw man, one misconstrues one's interlocutor's argument in a way that makes it especially weak, and then refutes it. In the weak man version, one selects an especially weak rendition of the opposing view, treats it as representative of the opposition as such, and refutes it, leaving one's audience with the impression that the opposition has thereby been refuted when in fact only the most vulnerable version of the opposing view has been addressed. Talisse and Aikin have also published a paper about the rhetorical strategy of repeating one's interlocutor's position in a dismissive or mocking tone of voice, which is titled "Modus Tonens". Talisse and Aikin have written a book together about atheism that is forthcoming from Prometheus Books titled Reasonable Atheism.

== 2002 conference controversy ==
In 2002, Talisse co-organized a conference marking the 100th anniversary of the birth of the pragmatist philosopher and public intellectual Sidney Hook. The conference provoked some controversy when several neoconservatives, including Irving Kristol, Gertrude Himmelfarb, and Hilton Kramer, who had been invited to speak at the conference withdrew upon learning that the pragmatist philosopher Cornel West had also been invited. According to Talisse, some of those who withdrew threatened to also attempt to convince those who had provided funding for the event to withdraw. Despite the protests, the conference was held at the City University of New York Graduate Center in October 2002, with West as a participant.

== Public appearances ==
In February 2010 Talisse appeared on the popular podcast Philosophy Bites where he was interviewed by Nigel Warburton about pragmatism and American philosophy. He returned to Philosophy Bites in July 2018 where he was interviewed by David Edmonds on overdoing democracy.

== Bibliography ==
- Overdoing Democracy: Why We Must Put Politics in its Place (Oxford University Press, 2019)
- Why We Argue (And How We Should), with Scott Aikin (Routledge, 2014)
- Pluralism and Liberal Politics, Routledge, 2012 (softcover, 2013)
- Reasonable Atheism, with Scott Aikin, Prometheus Books, 2011
- Democracy and Moral Conflict, Cambridge University Press, 2009
- Pragmatism: A Guide for the Perplexed, with Scott Aikin, Continuum Books, 2008
- A Pragmatist Philosophy of Democracy, Routledge, 2007
- Democracy After Liberalism, Routledge, 2005
