= Cynthia Freeland =

American philosopher of art

Cynthia A. Freeland (born 1951) is an American philosopher of art. She has published three monographs, over two dozen articles, and edited several books. She is emeritus professor of philosophy at the University of Houston. She was the president of the American Society of Aesthetics until 2017. She has been awarded a fellowship from the National Endowment for the Humanities in 2003 for a research project on Fakes and Forgeries. Her book But is it Art? (2001) has been translated into fourteen languages and was republished as part of the Oxford Very Short Introductions series. She talked about her book Portraits&Persons with Nigel Warburton on the Philosophy Bites podcast. She was interviewed by Hans Maes for the book Conversations on Art and Aesthetics (2017) which includes a photograph of her by American photographer Steve Pyke.

== Publications ==
Cynthia Freeland writes on aesthetics, ancient philosophy, philosophy of film, and feminist theory.

=== Monographs ===
- Portraits & Persons (Oxford University Press, June 2010).
- But is it Art?, (Oxford University Press, 2001). Republished as Art Theory: A Very Short Introduction (Oxford, 2002) Translated into Chinese (2002), Korean (2002), Spanish (2003), German (2003), Dutch (2003); Greek (2005); Polish (2005); Swedish (2006), Tamil (2006), Japanese (2008), Vietnamese (2009); Turkish (2009), Latvian (2009), simple Chinese (2009); under contract for translation into Hebrew, Portuguese, and Persian.
- The Naked and the Undead: Evil and the Appeal of Horror, (Westview Press, 1999).

=== Book chapters ===
- 'Penetrating Keanu', in The Matrix and Philosophy, Edited by William Irvin (Open Court Publishing Company, 2002).
- 'Aristotle on the Sense of Touch', In: Essays on Aristotle's De Anima, Edited by Martha C. Nussbaum and Amélie Oksenberg Rorty (Oxford University Press, 1995).
- 'Feminist Frameworks for Horror Films' In: Post-Theory: Reconstructing Film Studies, Edited by David Bordwell and Noël Carroll (University of Wisconsin Press, 1996).
- 'Emma's Pensive Meditations', In: Jane Austen's Emma: Philosophical Perspectives, Edited by E.M. Dadlez (Oxford University Press, 2018).
- 'Aristotle on Perception, Appetition, and Self-Motion' In: Self-Motion: From Aristotle to Newton, Edited by: James G. Lennox & Mary Louise Gill (Princeton University Press, 2017)

=== Selected articles ===
- 'The Naked and the Undead: Evil and the Appeal of Horror.' Journal of Aesthetics and Art Criticism, 2001, 59 (4): 433–434.
- 'Art and Moral Knowledge' Philosophical Topics, 1997 25 (1):11-36.
- 'Evaluating Art' with George Dickie - 1992 - Philosophical Review 101 (2):486.
- 'Aristotle's Theory of the Will' with Anthony Kenny - 1981 - Philosophical Review 90 (1):159.
- 'Aristotle on Possibilities and Capabilities' 1986 - Ancient Philosophy 6:69-89.
- 'Feminist Interpretations of Aristotle'. 2002 - Hypatia 17 (4):238-243.
- 'A New Question About Color' 2017 - Journal of Aesthetics and Art Criticism 75 (3):231-248.
- 'Feminism and Ideology in Ancient Philosophy' 2000 - Apeiron 33 (4):365 - 406.

=== Edited books ===
- Philosophy and Film. with Thomas E. Wartenberg (Routledge, 1995)
- Re-Reading the Canon: Feminist Readings on Aristotle. (Pennsylvania State University Press, 1998)
