= Victor Riesel =

American newspaper journalist (1913–1995)

- Riesel in 1956, before and after the acid attack which left him blind
- Born: March 26, 1913; New York City, U.S.
- Died: January 4, 1995 (aged 81); New York City, U.S.
- Occupations: Journalist, syndicated columnist

Victor Riesel (/rɪˈzɛl/; March 26, 1913 – January 4, 1995) was an American newspaper journalist and columnist who specialized in news related to labor unions. At the height of his career, his column on labor union issues was syndicated to 356 newspapers in the United States. In an incident that made national headlines for almost a year, a gangster threw sulfuric acid in his face on a public street in New York City on April 5, 1956, causing his permanent blindness.

== Background ==
Victor Riesel was born on the Lower East Side of Manhattan in New York City to Nathan and Sophie Riesel. The family lived in a cold water flat near the elevated railroad tracks. The Riesels were Jewish, and their neighbors were primarily Jewish and Italian American. Victor's father, Nathan, had helped organize the Bonnaz, Singer, and Hand Embroiderers' Union, Local 66, of the International Ladies Garment Workers Union in 1913, and held the Card No. 1 in the local union. In time, Nathan Riesel was appointed a staff member of the union and elected secretary-treasurer and then president of the local union. Victor attended elementary school at P.S. 19 (now the Judith K. Weiss School).

When Victor was three years old, his father taught him to make pro-union speeches and would take his son to rallies and union meetings and have the boy recite the speeches for onlookers. Attending union meetings, indoor and outdoor rallies, and standing on street corners promoting the union formed many of Victor Riesel's childhood and teenage memories. In the 1920s and 1930s, Nathan Riesel successfully opposed Communist Party USA attempts to infiltrate activists into the local union and turning its purpose to promotion of the party (a strategy known as "boring from within"). Throughout his childhood and teenage years, he saw his father come home bleeding many times after fistfights with communist activists or gangsters. This conflict left a deep impression on Victor.

The family moved to the Bronx when Riesel was 13 years old. Academically gifted, Victor Riesel graduated from Morris High School at the age of 15. While in high school, Riesel began typing stories about the American labor movement and sending them to English language newspapers around the world, charging $1 for publication rights. He typed the same story over and over (sometimes as many as 15 times) to make it look like an original (his goal being to sell the same story to many newspapers rather than many stories to a single newspaper), and earned a significant income from this work.

He enrolled in City College of New York (CCNY) in 1928, taking classes at night in human resource management and industrial relations.

== Career ==
Riesel worked several different jobs to support himself, and found employment in a hat factory, lace plant, steel mill, and saw mill. He was appointed director of undergraduate publications at the college, working as an editor, columnist, and literature and theatre critic. He earned his Bachelor of Business Administration from CCNY in 1940.

During his undergraduate years at CCNY, Riesel began working as a gofer at The New Leader. After graduation in 1940, he became the magazine's managing editor.

Two additional events in Riesel's life led him to a career as a labor reporter. The first occurred on March 6, 1930, during a visit to his father's union offices. Riesel saw a man weeping on the stairs because he had no job and his family had no food to eat. The second occurred in 1942. Nathan Riesel was now fighting organized crime influence in his union, and despaired of keeping his local out of criminal hands. Nathan Riesel was severely beaten by gangsters in 1942, and ultimately died from his injuries five years later.

=== Journalism ===
Victor Riesel's labor journalism career formally began in 1937 when he started writing a regular column on labor union issues.

He was hired by The New York Post in 1941. His column became nationally syndicated in 1942. He left the Post in 1948 after a change in management, and joined William Randolph Hearst's New York Daily Mirror. Within eight years, his column was syndicated in 193 newspapers.

His investigation of Communist Party infiltration of the National Maritime Union led Representative Louis B. Heller to introduce legislation in 1951 to investigate the charges. In 1951 and 1952, Riesel provided Senator Pat McCarran with information that led to a Senate investigation into communist influence in the United Public Workers of America. In 1952, he publicly alleged before the Subcommittee on Internal Security (led at the time by Sen. McCarran) that Local 65 of the Distributive, Processing and Office Workers of America was controlled by the Communist Party. The same year, he denounced Gambino crime family member Anthony "Tough Tony" Anastasio for engaging in labor racketeering. Anastasio sued Riesel for $1 million for libel, but the suit was thrown out of court.

On February 6, 1953, Riesel spoke with New York University philosophy professor Sidney Hook and others on "The Threat to Academic Freedom" in the evening on WEVD radio.

In 1956, Riesel began working with United States Attorney Paul Williams to rein in labor racketeering in the New York City garment and trucking industries.

=== Acid attack ===
On April 5, 1956, an assailant threw sulphuric acid into Riesel's face as he was leaving Lindy's (a famous restaurant in Manhattan). Riesel had been reporting on corruption in the International Union of Operating Engineers and its then-President, William C. DeKoning Jr. He had recently alleged that DeKoning was conspiring with Joseph S. Fay (a convicted labor racketeer and extortionist) to re-establish his father, William C. DeKoning Sr. (who had recently been freed from prison after serving a sentence for extortion) as president of the union. Although Riesel had received numerous death and other threats over the past few months, he had dismissed them as the work of "cranks."

The attack occurred shortly after a Riesel radio broadcast. Barry Gray, radio station WMCA's overnight talk radio host, had asked Riesel to substitute for him. Riesel invited two IUOE Local 138 leaders who were challenging the DeKonings for control of the local union to join him for the broadcast. The broadcast originated from Hutton's Restaurant at 47th Street and Lexington Avenue shortly after midnight on April 5, and concluded at 2 AM. Afterward, Riesel and his secretary went to Lindy's restaurant, located on Broadway between 49th Street and 50th Street. They had coffee, and departed Lindy's at 3 AM to walk to the secretary's automobile. Riesel removed his eyeglasses, which he did by habit when in public. A slender, black-haired man wearing a blue and white jacket stepped out of the shadows of the entrance to the Mark Hellinger Theatre and threw a vial of sulphuric acid into Riesel's eyes. Riesel shouted, "My gosh! My gosh!", and clutched at his face. While the secretary and others rendered assistance and dragged Riesel into Lindy's, the assailant walked calmly away.

The acid struck Riesel's right eye more than the left. Riesel's eyes were flushed with water inside Lindy's, but patrons stopped administering aid for fear of doing further damage. Riesel was taken to St. Clare's Hospital on East 71st Street, where doctors worked to save his vision. Measures to counteract the acid were not taken until Riesel arrived at St. Clare's, 40 minutes after the attack. On May 4, doctors said that Riesel had completely lost his sight (see the right photograph in the infobox, above). In December 1956, Riesel described the amount of acid as a "deluge" which covered most of his cheeks, eyes, and forehead. Portions of Riesel's face (see right photo, above, compared to left photo, particularly the left cheek, jaw line, and jowls; the eyebrows; and the forehead) were permanently scarred as well. Riesel wore dark glasses for the rest of his life to hide his damaged eyes, which many people found difficult to look at.

The Daily Mirror immediately offered a $10,000 reward for information identifying the assailant and leading to his conviction. The Newspaper Guild of New York, New York Press Photographers Association, Overseas Press Club, New York Newspaper Reporters Association, and the Society of Silurians (an organization of veteran New York City journalists) immediately raised the reward to $15,000. By week's end, donations from labor unions, radio station WMCA, and other groups had increased the reward to $41,000.

The Federal Bureau of Investigation (FBI) identified Abraham Telvi as the assailant in August 1956, but Telvi had been murdered on July 28, 1956, by mobsters for demanding an additional $50,000 on top of the $500 he had already received for the crime. On August 29, 1956, Genovese crime family underboss Johnny Dio was arrested for conspiracy in the Riesel attack, pleaded not guilty, and was released on $100,000 bond even though prosecutors later publicly linked him to the Telvi murder.

Joseph Carlino, a Dio associate who had hired Telvi to attack Riesel, pleaded guilty on October 22, and prosecutors severed Dio's trial from the others. Carlino later testified that Dio had ordered Genovese mob associate Gandolfo Miranti to find a hitman and identify Riesel, and that Miranti had contacted Dominick Bando to assist him in finding the hitman (Bando contacting Carlino, who sought out Telvi). Miranti and Bando were then found guilty (Bando pleading guilty at the last moment). Conspiracy charges against Dio were later dropped despite the convictions. Dio's attorney delayed the trial for nearly five months with motions. When the trial finally began, Carlino and Miranti recanted their pre-trial statements and courtroom testimony, claiming they did not know who had ordered the attack on Riesel. By September 1957, the government no longer sought to prosecute Dio for the attack. Miranti received 8 to 16 years in prison and Bando 2 to 5 years in prison for the acid attack and another five years for contempt of court. Carlino received a suspended sentence for cooperating with the prosecution, and three other co-conspirators were freed after the judge in their case declared a mistrial. The Daily Mirror paid one witness $5,000 in 1961 for information leading to the identification of Abraham Telvi as the assailant.

The attack on Riesel had significant implications for national American labor policy. President Dwight Eisenhower (who had seen Riesel on Meet the Press) told AFL-CIO President George Meany that he was so incensed by the attack on Riesel that he intended to introduce legislation designed to root out corruption in labor unions. Clark R. Mollenhoff, editor of the Des Moines Register, was so alarmed by the attack on Riesel that he ordered extensive investigations into trade union corruption. Mollenhoff's investigative efforts unearthed much evidence that Teamsters President Jimmy Hoffa was engaged in labor racketeering. The attack also convinced Robert F. Kennedy, then chief legal counsel for the Senate Committee on Government Operations, to lead an investigation into labor racketeering. Kennedy's investigations (as well as subsequent labor scandals) led to the establishment of the Senate Select Committee on Improper Activities in Labor and Management. This committee's investigations led directly to the passage of the Labor Management Reporting and Disclosure Act, which imposed financial reporting requirements on labor unions, limited the power of trusteeships, established many member and employer rights.

The acid attack vastly boosted Riesel's national popularity. He began a regular television program on WRCA-TV, and a regular weekly radio program on WEVD. He continued to write his column, typing it himself while his wife read newspapers and wire service articles to him.

=== Anti-communist views ===
Riesel was a militant anti-communist. Initially, his views focused on both fascism and communism. As early as 1939, he joined John Dewey's newly formed Committee for Cultural Freedom, which was opposed to totalitarianism in all its forms. In 1941, he told the Union for Democratic Action that Rep. Martin Dies Jr. was intent on establishing a national fascist police force to suppress freedom of speech in the United States.

Riesel's attacks on fascism lessened after victory in World War II, and he focused almost exclusively on communism after 1950. Riesel's attacks on communism extended beyond labor unions. He attacked folk musician Vern Partlow for promoting communism and undermining American national security with his 1945 talking blues song "Atomic Talking Blues" (also known as "Talking Atom" and "Old Man Atom"). In 1949, he was named a director of the committee to Defend America by Aiding Anti-Communist China, a part of the China Lobby. At least one author alleges that Riesel even cooperated with the Central Intelligence Agency beginning in the early 1950s, providing information on liberal politicians and union leaders. In the early 1950s, he supported a movement to stop the importation of goods from the Soviet Union into the United States, and for a time longshoremen on the East Coast refused to unload Soviet ships due to Riesel's campaign. During the height of McCarthyism in the early 1950s, he also became interested in purging homosexuals from federal civil service. He publicly called for a "preventive war" with the Soviet Union in 1951, and demanded that President Harry S. Truman drop the atomic bomb on Russia and China. Riesel was a member of the Citizens Committee for a Free Cuba, founded in 1963. He strongly criticized Malcolm X for meeting with Shirley Graham Du Bois and Julian Mayfield in the mid-1960s, and accused Malcolm X of fomenting communist conspiracies. In the early 1970s, Riesel became an unofficial advisor to President Richard Nixon. He supported Nixon in his column, discussed labor union issues and outreach to working-class voters with him personally over the phone, and occasionally met with Cabinet members. Even as late as 1973, Riesel was defending COINTELPRO, a series of covert and often illegal projects conducted by the FBI aimed at investigating and disrupting dissident political organizations in the U.S. suspected of disloyalty.

Riesel was intimately involved in the Hollywood blacklist of the late 1940s and 1950s. He strongly criticized Samuel Fuller's 1951 Korean War film The Steel Helmet for promoting communism and portraying American soldiers as murderers. He also attacked the 1954 pro-union film Salt of the Earth as communistic, and implied that the production's on-location proximity to Los Alamos National Laboratory and the Nevada Test Site was a cover for Soviet spying on the American nuclear weapons program. Riesel saw it as his patriotic duty to publicize allegations of communist influence made against actors, directors, producers, and others (especially those claims made by conservative actors Adolphe Menjou and Ward Bond). As the blacklist lifted, Riesel agreed to allow his column to become a means for blacklisted individuals to admit their offenses, denounce communism, and become active in the motion picture industry again. Along with Hedda Hopper and Walter Winchell, he would meet privately with these individuals, assess the sincerity of their penance, and then work with them to help rehabilitate their careers if he believed they were being honest with him.

=== Later life ===
After the Daily Mirror ceased publication in October, 1963, Riesel continued to publish his syndicated column. Three men who leased coin-operated pool tables to establishments in California sued Riesel for libel in 1965, alleging that his column on racketeering in the vending industry defamed them.

Riesel was elected a director of the Overseas Press Club in 1962, and the organization's president in 1966 (he served a single one-year term).

Riesel retired his column in 1990.

== Personal life and death ==
Riesel married the former Evelyn Lobelson after graduating from college. The couple had a son in 1942 and a daughter in 1949.

Riesel died of cardiac arrest at his apartment in Manhattan aged 81. His wife, son, and daughter survived him.

== Publications ==
- "A Precedent in Arrogance in Set." Los Angeles Times (April 1, 1965), pt. II, p. 5.
- "Probers Believe Ruby Convinced Oswald to Kill JFK." Rome News-Tribune (October 5, 1978), p. 4.
