= Alice Beal Parsons =

American writer (1886–1962)

- Parsons, from a 1926 publication
- Born: Alice Laura Beal; October 8, 1886; Rockford, Illinois, U.S.
- Died: April 14, 1962 (aged 75); Nyack, New York, U.S.
- Occupations: Writer, activist

Alice Laura Beal Parsons (October 6, 1886 – April 14, 1962) was an American writer and activist. She wrote several novels and contributed to national magazines.

== Early life and education ==
Beal was born in Rockford, Illinois, the daughter of Mart Alph Beal and Laura Lucretia Starr Beal. Her grandfather, Henry Nevins Starr, was mayor of Rockford. She graduated from Rockford College in 1908, and pursued graduate studies at the University of Chicago.

== Career ==
Parsons managed a large farm in Vermont, worked as a business manager and literary critic, and taught at the Rand School. Much of her fiction involves feminist and socialist themes. She was a member of the Committee for Cultural Freedom, the Communist Labor Party, the New York State Liberal Party, and a peace organization.

Parsons and three men were arrested in Rockford in 1920 as Communists. "The radical utterances of Mrs. Parsons have been town talk for a long time," explained the Rockford newspaper. "She appeared to glory in her fanaticism they said, and to live largely for the purpose of devouring 'Red' literature." Clarence Darrow defended her in court, and she later included him as a character in a 1938 novel based on the arrests and trial.

Two of her later books, The Mountain (1944) and The World Around the Mountain (1947), are accounts of her life in Nyack, New York.

== Publications ==
=== Books ===
- Woman's Dilemma (1926, non-fiction)
- The Insider (1929, novel)
- John Merrill's Pleasant Life (1930, novel)
- A Lady Who Lost (1932, novel)
- The Trial of Helen MacLeod (1938, novel)
- The Mountain (1944, non-fiction)
- I Know What I'd Do (1946, novel)
- The World Around the Mountain (1947, non-fiction)

=== Contributions to Harper's Magazine ===
- "The despotism of Polly Ross" (1930)
- "Should parents tell all?" (1931)
- "Beating the economic system" (1931)
- "Shall we make our children commonplace?" (1932)
- "Our backward thinkers" (1937)

=== Other short works ===
- "How changing conditions change mothers" (1926, Progressive Education)
- "Every woman's home" (1926, The Woman Citizen)
- "So you're glad to be home?" (1930, The Atlantic)
- "The conquest of emotion" (1932, Virginia Quarterly Review)

== Personal life ==
Beal married Hugh Graham Parsons in 1914; they had a daughter, and they divorced after her 1920 arrest. She died in 1962, at the age of 75, in Nyack, New York.
