= Mildred B. Mitchell =

American psychologist (1903–1983)

- Born: December 25, 1903; Rockford, Illinois
- Died: 1983 (aged 79–80)
- Education: Rockford College; Radcliffe College; Yale University
- Occupation: Psychologist
- Spouse: Ira Spear

Mildred Bessie Mitchell (1903–1983) was a psychologist who graduated with her doctorate from Yale University in 1931. She was the first clinical psychology examiner for the US Astronaut Program helping NASA select men for Project Mercury spaceflight in 1959.

== Biography ==
Mitchell was born on December 25, 1903, in Rockford, Illinois. In 1920, Mitchell began her studies at Rockford College, where she received a Bachelor of Arts in 1924 with a major in mathematics and a minor in philosophy, speech and education.

In Summer 1926, Mitchell started studying psychology at Harvard University hoping to earn her Masters there, however she was soon faced with "deeply rooted sex discrimination." Even though she was attending all her classes on that campus, she was told women were not allowed to enroll officially as Harvard students. In addition, the psychology department as well as the "Widener libraries were closed to women in the evenings."

In 1927, Mitchell obtained her M.A. in psychology from Harvard's "sister school," Radcliffe College, and moved to Yale to continue her graduate studies. There she felt included in the department's activities, was given a private office for her to work and study and a set of keys to the university libraries. At Yale, she obtained her Ph.D. in 1931. Her finished dissertation discussed the types of errors made by human subjects attempting to memorize numbers with three digits.

=== Career ===
In 1936, Mitchell worked as a vocational director for a department she started for the U.S. Employment Service in New Hampshire. In 1939, she successfully established two psychology departments in Iowa state hospitals. In 1943 she worked at the U.S. Naval Hospital in Bethesda, Maryland. By 1947, she was at the Mental Hygiene Clinic in Ft. Snelling, Minnesota but "was never promoted to a grade higher than her male colleagues, even though she was doing the work of three male psychologists who had fewer trainees."

In February and March, 1959, NASA asked Mitchell to help screen the 31 astronaut candidates for the Project Mercury spaceflight. Michell's concern about the candidates, all men and all highly recommended by their military services, was their individual capability to work and make decisions under severe stress. After her participation in that selection process became widely known, she was finally promoted to the rank of Lieutenant Commander.

=== Personal life ===
In 1942, Mitchell joined the first women's auxiliary in the U.S. Army. Mitchell met an Army Lieutenant, Ira Spear, at a dance in Washington and they married in 1947.

Mitchell died in 1983.
