= Committee for Cultural Freedom =

American political organization

The Committee for Cultural Freedom (CCF) was an American political organization active from 1939 to 1951 which advocated opposition to the totalitarianism of both the Soviet Union and Nazi Germany in foreign affairs, and promoted pro-democratic reforms in public and private institutions domestically. Co-founded by influential philosopher and educator John Dewey and the anti-Soviet Marxist academic Sidney Hook, it was reorganized in January 1951 into the American Committee for Cultural Freedom.

== History ==
=== Founding ===
The Committee for Cultural Freedom (CCF) was founded on May 14, 1939. The genesis of the CCF was a disagreement among communists, socialists, leftists, and centrists in the United States over the value of forming a popular front and the need for violence, revolution, and dictatorship in establishing a more just society. Many American far left-wing intellectuals in the 1920s and 1930s were Trotskyists who believed in democracy and were opposed to the totalitarianism advocated by Joseph Stalin and Stalinism. The CCF was an attempt by John Dewey and other leftists to break with what they argued was the totalitarianism of the Communist Party USA and "cleanse" left-wing politics to make it more palatable to the mainstream of American voters. But the goals of the group's founders were not uniform on this. Dewey saw the CCF as an independent organization. Hook saw the CCF as a means of undermining the popular front. Dewey believed that he could persuade other left-wing organizations to give up their belief in revolution and dictatorship and join with the CCF in promoting leftist ideals. Hook secretly worked against him in these negotiations. The CCF's statement of purpose was signed by 96 intellectuals in May 1939. However, it did not hold its first meeting until October 1939.

The primary co-founders of the organization were John Dewey and Sidney Hook. Dewey served as the organization's honorary chair and Ferdinand Lundberg was its secretary, but Hook was individual who pushed for its formation. Hook played a critical role in the group. He and Frank N. Trager co-chaired the CCF's Committee on Plans and Organization, which was the backbone of the organization. The CCF produced a number of reports on politics, economics, culture, and foreign affairs during its short lifetime. Two of its earliest and most influential reports were "Stalinist Outposts in the United States" and "Nazi Outposts in the United States", which listed for the first time in American history front organizations for the Soviet Union and Nazi Germany. The CCF began publishing the CCF Bulletin, a monthly newsletter, in October 1939.

The founding of the CCF was not without controversy. Many leftists, such as Dwight Macdonald, believed the CCF was not sufficiently leftist, and formed a splinter Trotskyist group with similar aims called the League for Cultural Freedom and Socialism. The CCF was criticized by mainstream liberal intellectuals and groups as well. The political magazine The New Republic actively campaigned in its pages against the CCF. The New Republic accused the CCF of actively aiding fascism and supporting a Trotskyist revolution in the U.S. Freda Kirchwey, editor of The Nation (a liberal political magazine), strongly criticized the CCF for equating Stalinism and fascism without recognizing the two political systems' differences. The New Republic and The Nation pressured mainstream liberals and respected leftist intellectuals to resign their membership in the CCF. Hook and Trager, through the CCF Committee on Plans and Organization, sought to counteract this pressure through anonymous and signed letters to major newspapers, pamphlets, speeches, and anonymous and on-the-record quotations supporting the CCF.

=== Activities ===
In domestic affairs, the CCF opposed any attempt to engage in an ideological or political witch-hunt or otherwise impose restrictions on intellectual or political freedoms. For example, the CCF very early on opposed attempts by state curriculum committees to censor elementary and secondary education textbooks or investigate the political ideologies of textbook authors. The CCF also attacked the anti-communist Rapp-Coudert Committee's 1940 hearings in New York state, during which widespread abuse of the subpoena power, use of informants, reliance on hearsay and rumor, and badgering of witnesses led to an anti-communist witch-hunt against public school teachers and professors in state-run colleges and universities. Nonetheless, the CCF did oppose active communist influence within other organizations (such as unions) and the public schools. Its justification was that most communist organizations were Stalinist in outlook and opposed to democracy. In fact, one of the reason why Dewey agreed to co-found the CCF was that the Communist Party USA had taken control of the American Federation of Teachers local (Local 5) in New York City by the mid-1930s. The communists in Local 5 had diverted the union's attention away from wages, benefits, and working conditions and used obstructionist tactics to prevent the local union from functioning. Dewey, an AFT member, was determined to break the communist control of Local 5. After a lengthy series of battles, the CCF helped elect CCF member George Counts elected president of the local union, breaking the communist insurgency within the AFT.

In international affairs, the CCF condemned both the Soviet Union and Nazi Germany for engaging in totalitarianism. This opposition was controversial at the time, for many Americans perceived the Soviet Union to be acting as a bulwark against Nazi Germany and the territorial ambitions of Adolf Hitler. In early August 1939, more than 400 people signed a public letter denouncing the CCF's linkage of Stalinism and Nazism, and defending the Soviet Union. Two weeks later, Germany and the Soviet Union signed the Molotov–Ribbentrop Pact, severely undermining this argument and embarrassing the signers of the letter. Dewey resigned as honorary chair after news of the pact was made public. Reinhold Niebuhr pleaded with him in 1944 to rejoin the CCF, but he refused—arguing too much of the Committee's attention was focused on opposing communism and not enough on other forms of totalitarianism.

=== Dissolution ===
The CCF was the inspiration for several anti-communist groups like Americans for Intellectual Freedom and the American Committee for Cultural Freedom. In 1951, Hook reorganized the CCF into the American Committee for Cultural Freedom (ACCF). In August 1948, the Soviet Union sponsored the World Congress of Intellectuals in Defense of Peace in Wrocław, Poland, during which Western and democratic culture were widely denounced. The conference deeply unsettled American leftists and alarmed American political figures. American leftists subsequently held a conference March 25–27, 1949, at the Waldorf-Astoria Hotel in New York City in which these criticisms were addressed. Many of the speakers, however, attacked the United States for taking an over-aggressive and militaristic stand toward the Soviet Union which had exacerbated tension between the two nations. "The Waldorf Conference", as the event came to be known, made headlines worldwide. The Central Intelligence Agency (CIA) and American political leaders became concerned that the United States was losing the battle for the hearts and minds of Western Europeans.

In 1950, the CIA secretly organized and funded the Congress for Cultural Freedom. Held on June 26, 1950, the Congress for Cultural Freedom brought together leading leftist thinkers, artists, and politicians from Western Europe and the U.S. at the Titania Palace in West Berlin. While nearly all the attendees were socialists or strongly leftist, nearly all were also strongly anti-communist and vocally opposed to the Soviet Union. Using the far-left politics of the attendees as a cover, the Congress for Cultural Freedom began a worldwide effort to undermine Soviet influence in academia and the arts. It began funding and infiltrating the Europe-America Groups, small organizations of American and European writers established by left-wing American novelist Mary McCarthy in 1948 to promote European-American understanding.

The CIA also began working with Sidney Hook, whose anti-Soviet views had dramatically intensified since the 1930s. Hook initially tried to get the Europe-America Groups to fund the CCF (by then largely moribund) so that the CCF might carry out anti-Soviet activities in the U.S. When that effort failed, Hook dissolved the CCF and created the American Committee for Cultural Freedom on January 5, 1951, to secure CIA funding indirectly through the Congress for Cultural Freedom. The American Committee for Cultural Freedom name was purposefully chosen to echo the predecessor organization's name and build on its good reputation. The primary co-founders of the ACCF were Hook, George Counts, novelist James T. Farrell.

== Bibliography ==
- Bell, Daniel. Marxian Socialism in the United States. Ithaca, N.Y.: Cornell University Press, 1996.
- Boydston, Jo A. John Dewey: The Later Works: 1925–1953. Carbondale, Ill.: Southern Illinois University Press, 1988.
- Bullert, Gary. The Politics of John Dewey. Buffalo, N.Y.: Prometheus Books, 1983.
- Coleman, Peter. The Liberal Conspiracy: The Congress for Cultural Freedom and the Struggle for the Mind of Postwar Europe. New York: The Free Press, 1989.
- Cooney, Terry A. The Rise of The New York Intellectuals: 'Partisan Review' and Its Circle. Madison, Wisc.: University of Wisconsin Press, 2004.
- Diggins, John Patrick. The Promise of Pragmatism: Modernism and the Crisis of Knowledge and Authority. Chicago: University of Chicago Press, 1994.
- Eaton, William Edward. The American Federation of Teachers, 1916–1961: A History of the Movement. Urbana, Ill.: Southern Illinois University Press, 1975.
- Evans, Ronald W. This Happened in America: Harold Rugg and the Censure of Social Studies. Charlotte, N.C.: Information Age Publishers, 2007.
- Geiger, Roger L. Perspectives on the History of Higher Education: History of Higher Education Annual, Vol. 26. New Brunswick, N.J.: Transaction Publishers, 2007.
- Goffman, Ethan and Morris, Daniel. The New York Public Intellectuals and Beyond: Exploring Liberal Humanism, Jewish Identity, and the American Protest Tradition. West Lafayette, Ind.: Purdue University Press, 2009.
- Gross, Neil. Richard Rorty: The Making of an American Philosopher. Chicago: University of Chicago Press, 2008.
- Hartman, Andrew. Education and the Cold War: The Battle for the American School. New York: Palgrave Macmillan, 2008.
- Hemingway, Andrew. Artists on the Left: American Artists and the Communist Movement, 1926–1956. New Haven, Conn.: Yale University Press, 2002.
- Hogan, David and Karier, Clarence. "Professionalizing the Role of 'Truth Seekers'." In John Dewey: Critical Assessments. J.E. Tiles, ed. New York: Routledge, 2004.
- Jumonville, Neil. Critical Crossings: The New York Intellectuals in Postwar America. Berkeley, Calif.: University of California Press, 1991.
- Karier, Clarence J. The Individual, Society, and Education: A History of American Educational Ideas. Urbana, Ill.: University of Illinois Press, 1986.
- Karier, Clarence J. "Liberalism and the Quest for Orderly Change." In Schooling and Capitalism: A Sociological Reader. Roger Dale, ed. London: Routledge & Kegan Paul, 1976.
- Kiernan, Frances. Seeing Mary Plain: A Life of Mary McCarthy. New York: W.W. Norton, 2002.
- Kloppenberg, James T. The Virtues of Liberalism. Oxford, U.K.: Oxford University Press, 1998.
- Kutulas, Judy. The Long War: The Intellectual People's Front and Anti-Stalinism, 1930–40. Durham, N.C.: Duke University Press, 1995.
- Manning, Martin. Historical Dictionary of American Propaganda. Westport, Conn.: Greenwood Press, 2004.
- Martin, Jay. The Education of John Dewey: A Biography. New York: Columbia University Press, 2002.
- "New Group Fights Any Freedom Curb". The New York Times. May 15, 1939.
- Phelps, Christopher. Young Sidney Hook: Marxist and Pragmatist. Ann Arbor, Mich.: University of Michigan Press, 2005.
- Rosteck, Thomas. At the Intersection: Cultural Studies and Rhetorical Studies. New York: Guilford Press, 1998.
- Schlesinger, Arthur M. A Life in the Twentieth Century: Innocent Beginnings, 1917–1950. Boston: Mariner Books, 2000.
- Scott-Smith, Giles. The Politics of Apolitical Culture: The Congress for Cultural Freedom and the Political Economy of American Hegemony, 1945–1955. New York: Routledge, 2001.
- Sumner, Gregory D. Dwight Macdonald and the Politics Circle: The Challenge of Cosmopolitan Democracy. Ithaca, N.Y.: Cornell University Press, 1996.
- Wilford, Hugh. The CIA, the British Left and the Cold War: Calling the Tune? New York: Routledge, 2003.
