= Andrew Lang (Minnesota politician) =

American politician (born 1979)

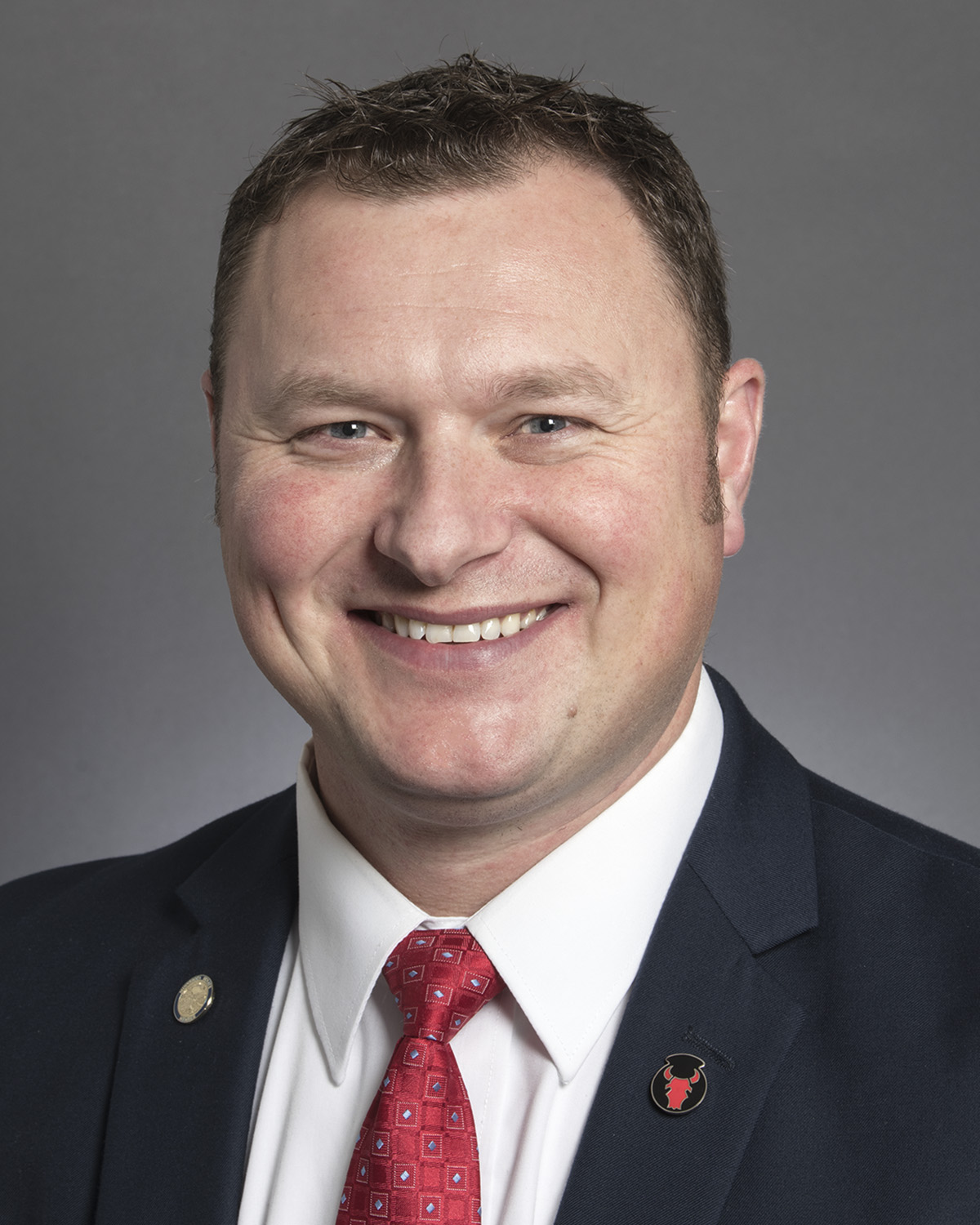

Member of the Minnesota Senate from the 16th district
- Incumbent
- Assumed office January 3, 2017
- Preceded by: Lyle Koenen

Personal details
- Born: 1979 (age 46–47)
- Party: Republican
- Spouse: Susan
- Children: 2
- Education: Ridgewater College; St. Cloud State University
- Occupation: Helicopter pilot

Andrew R. Lang is an American politician and Republican member of the Minnesota Senate. He represents District 16, which includes portions of Chippewa, Kandiyohi, Renville, and Swift Counties in west-central Minnesota. Lang is a major in the Minnesota Army National Guard.

== Early life, education, and career ==
Lang grew up in Kandiyohi, Minnesota, and graduated from Willmar High School in 1997. He attended Ridgewater College before transferring to St. Cloud State University, where he graduated with a bachelor's degree in aviation science and management.

Lang joined the Minnesota Army National Guard in 2002 and became a commissioned officer in 2003. He was stationed in Balad, Iraq, from April 2007 to August 2008. In June 2014, he participated in Operation Enduring Freedom and later Operation Inherent Resolve. Lang is a major and a logistics officer in the 34th Aviation Brigade. In addition to flying Black Hawk helicopters for the National Guard, he is a pilot for Life Link III. He was previously the parks supervisor for Renville County.

== Minnesota Senate ==
In his first run for public office, Lang was elected to the Minnesota Senate in 2016, defeating DFL incumbent Lyle Koenen. Lang serves as vice chair of the Senate Veterans and Military Affairs Finance and Policy Committee.

== Personal life ==
Lang and his wife, Susan, have two children and reside in Olivia. They are members of the Cross of Calvary Lutheran Church in Olivia.
