= Rockford University =

Private university in Rockford, Illinois, US

Coordinates: 42.26734°N 89.01810°W

- Former names: Rockford Female Seminary (1847–1892); Rockford College (1892–2013)
- Motto: Decus et Veritas (Latin)
- Motto in English: Honor and Truth
- Type: Private university
- Established: 1847; 179 years ago
- President: Patricia Lynott
- Faculty: 72 full-time faculty and 135 part-time
- Students: 1,181 (Fall 2022)
- Location: Rockford, Illinois, U.S.
- Campus: 76 acres (31 ha); Suburban, 150 acres (61 ha)
- Colors: Purple & white
- Nickname: Regents
- Sporting affiliations: NCAA Division III – Northern Athletics Collegiate Conference
- Mascot: Reggie the Regent
- Website: rockford.edu

Rockford University is a private university in Rockford, Illinois, United States. It was founded in 1847 as Rockford Female Seminary and changed its name to Rockford College in 1892, and to Rockford University in 2013.

== History ==
=== Beginning ===
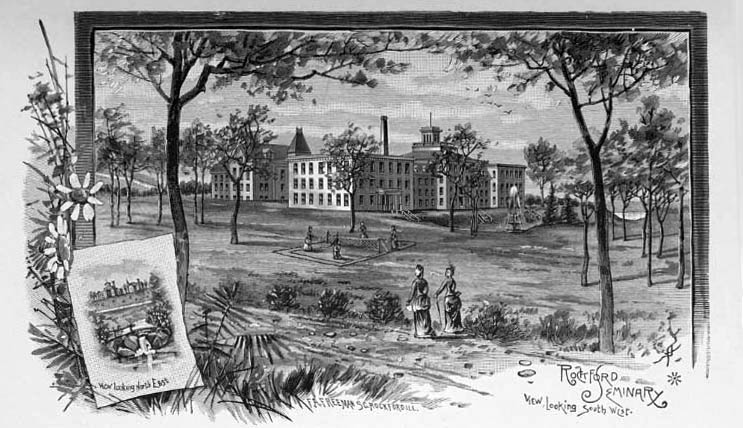
Rockford Seminary (c. 1890)

Rockford Female Seminary was founded in 1847 as the sister college of Beloit College, which had been founded the year before. The seminary's initial campus was on the east side of the Rock River, south of downtown Rockford. Anna Peck Sill served as principal for the first 35 years.

In 1890, the seminary's trustees voted to offer a full college curriculum, which led to the name changing to "Rockford College" in 1892. In 1896, Phebe Temperance Sutliff became the school's president, continuing in that role until 1901.

Men were first granted admission to the university at the beginning of the 1955–1956 school year. At about this time, the school requested that the City of Rockford close parts of a street adjoining the campus.

In 1984, Rockford College founded Regent's College in London, now Regent's University London.

=== Rockford University ===
On October 2, 2012, the board of trustees voted unanimously to rename the college as a university. The trustees did so because the institution has many different academic departments. On July 1, 2013, the institution officially became "Rockford University".

Patricia Lynott has served as the university's president since 2022.

The university held a business summit June 29, 2023, that included presidents of the Rockford Hard Rock Casino and OSF St. Anthony Medical Center.

== Academics ==
The university offers approximately 80 majors, minors and concentrations, including the adult accelerated degree completion program for a B.S. in Management Studies. Through its Graduate Studies department, degree include the Master of Business Administration (MBA), Master of Arts in Teaching (MAT), and a Master of Education (MEd).

The university is organized into three colleges:

- Arts and Humanities
- Science, Math, and Nursing
- Social Sciences, Commerce and Education

The university offers an Honors Program in Liberal Arts & Sciences. Also housed within the university are the Center for Nonprofit Excellence and the Center for Learning Strategies.

== Athletics ==
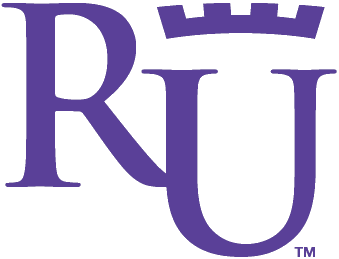
Rockford athletics logo

The Rockford University Regents are Division III members of the NCAA. Teams compete independently or as members of the Northern Athletics Collegiate Conference.

The university fields men's teams in baseball, basketball, cross country, football, soccer, and track and field, and women's teams in basketball, cross country, soccer, softball, track and field, and volleyball.

== Notable alumni ==
- Jane Addams, activist and social worker
- Ellen Gates Starr, activist and social reformer
- Julia Lathrop, social reformer
- Ron Kowalke, American painter, printmaker, sculptor, and art educator
- Sandy Cole, state representative in Illinois
- Arthur A. Collins, radio engineer, researcher, entrepreneur
- Roger Cooper, politician
- Hind Rassam Culhane, professor and journalist
- Yvonne D'Arle, opera singer
- Jeannette Durno, pianist and music educator
- Jeannette Howard Foster, lesbian writer/researcher
- Barbara Giolitto, politician
- Vivian Hickey, educator/politician
- Joyce Holmberg, educator/politician
- Betty Ann Keegan, politician
- Doris Lee, artist
- Helen Douglas Mankin, politician
- Catherine Waugh McCulloch, suffragist
- Mildred Bessie Mitchell, psychologist
- Ellen Spencer Mussey, pioneer in field of women's rights to education
- Anna E. Nicholes, social reformer, civil servant, clubwoman
- F. William Parker, actor
- Alice Beal Parsons, writer
- Deb Patterson, women's basketball coach
- Mark Pedowitz, television executive
- Belle L. Pettigrew, educator, missionary
- Roland Poska, artist
- Barbara Santucci, children's author
- Robin Schone, author
- Harriet G. R. Wright, member of the Colorado House of Representatives
- Dawn Gile, member of the Maryland Senate

== See also ==
- Female seminaries
- Women in education in the United States
