= Lyle Koenen =

American politician (born 1956)

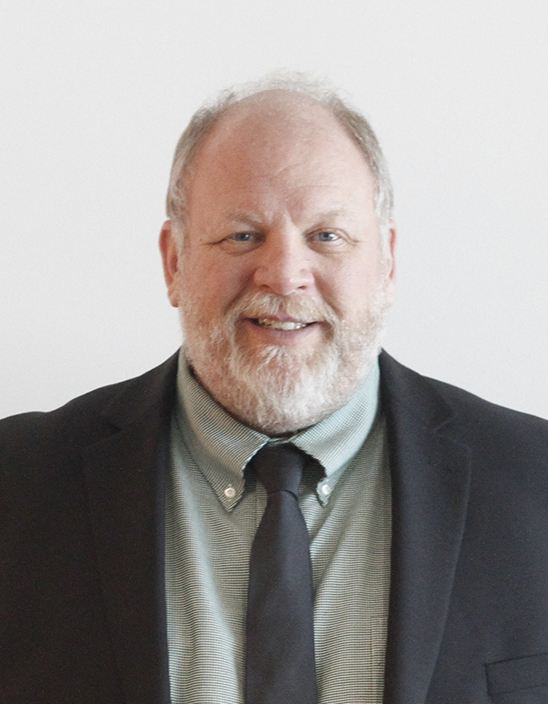

Member of the Minnesota Senate from the 17th district 20th (2012–2013)
- In office April 18, 2012 – January 2, 2017
- Preceded by: Gary Kubly
- Succeeded by: Andrew Lang

Member of the Minnesota House of Representatives from the 20B district
- In office January 7, 2003 – April 17, 2012
- Preceded by: Gary Kubly (District 15B)
- Succeeded by: Andrew Falk (District 17A)

Personal details
- Born: June 16, 1956 (age 70) Willmar, Minnesota, U.S.
- Party: Minnesota Democratic–Farmer–Labor Party
- Spouse: Sandy
- Children: 4
- Education: Willmar Technical College

Lyle J. Koenen (born June 16, 1956) is a Minnesota politician and former member of the Minnesota Senate. A member of the Minnesota Democratic–Farmer–Labor Party (DFL), he represented District 17, which included portions of Chippewa, Kandiyohi, Renville, and Swift counties in the southwestern part of the state.

== Early life, education, and career ==
Koenen attended Maynard High School in Maynard, then Willmar Technical College in Willmar, earning his A.A. in agriculture. He has worked as a dairy farmer and was also a milk truck and school bus driver. He has co-chaired the Chippewa County National Farmers Union since 1996.

== Minnesota House of Representatives ==
Koenen was first elected in 2002, and was reelected four times. He chaired the House Agriculture, Rural Economies and Veterans Affairs subcommittee for the Veterans Affairs Division. On May 21, 2011, he was one of two DFL representatives who voted with a majority of Republicans to send a constitutional ban on same-sex marriage to a 2012 referendum.

== Minnesota Senate ==
Koenen was elected to the Senate in a special election in 2012 to fill the seat left vacant after the death of Gary Kubly. He was sworn in on April 18, 2012. Koenen ran for reelection to the newly drawn District 17 in 2012, defeating incumbent Willmar Republican Joseph Gimse. He lost reelection to Republican Andrew Lang.
