= Barbara Santucci =

Barbara Jean Santucci (born April 11, 1947, in Chicago, Illinois) is an American artist, poet and author of several children's books. Santucci is best known as a children's book author and traveling lecturer. Her stories and lectures deal with the struggle of children to adapt to an adult world.

Santucci was born and raised in Chicago. She attended university at Rockford College. As a young adult, she was concerned with helping others, first pursuing a career in nursing, then working as a teacher and librarian.

In the 1980s, Santucci left teaching to focus on her own children. During this time, she developed a love for children's literature that inspired her to write. As her children reached adulthood and left home, she began writing and creating art. Her style stresses creativity, borrowing everyday objects to create colorful patterns, heavily inspired by nature.

In 2001, Santucci published her first book, Loon Summer, in which a young girl strives to deal with her parents' divorce. The book is a meditative work, exploring the complex nature of relationships and the continuing ability to grow. Loon Summer was followed by Anna's Corn (2002) and Abby's Chairs (2004), both of which focus on the ability of children to adapt to change.

== Publications ==
- Loon Summer. Illustrated by Andrea Shine. Eerdmans. 2001. ISBN 978-0-8028-5182-6.
- Anna's Corn. Illustrated by Lloyd Bloom. Eerdmans. 2002. ISBN 978-0-8028-5119-2.
- Abby's Chairs. Illustrated by Debrah Santini. Eerdman's. 2004. ISBN 0-8028-5205-X.
