= Sidney Hook =

American philosopher (1902–1989)

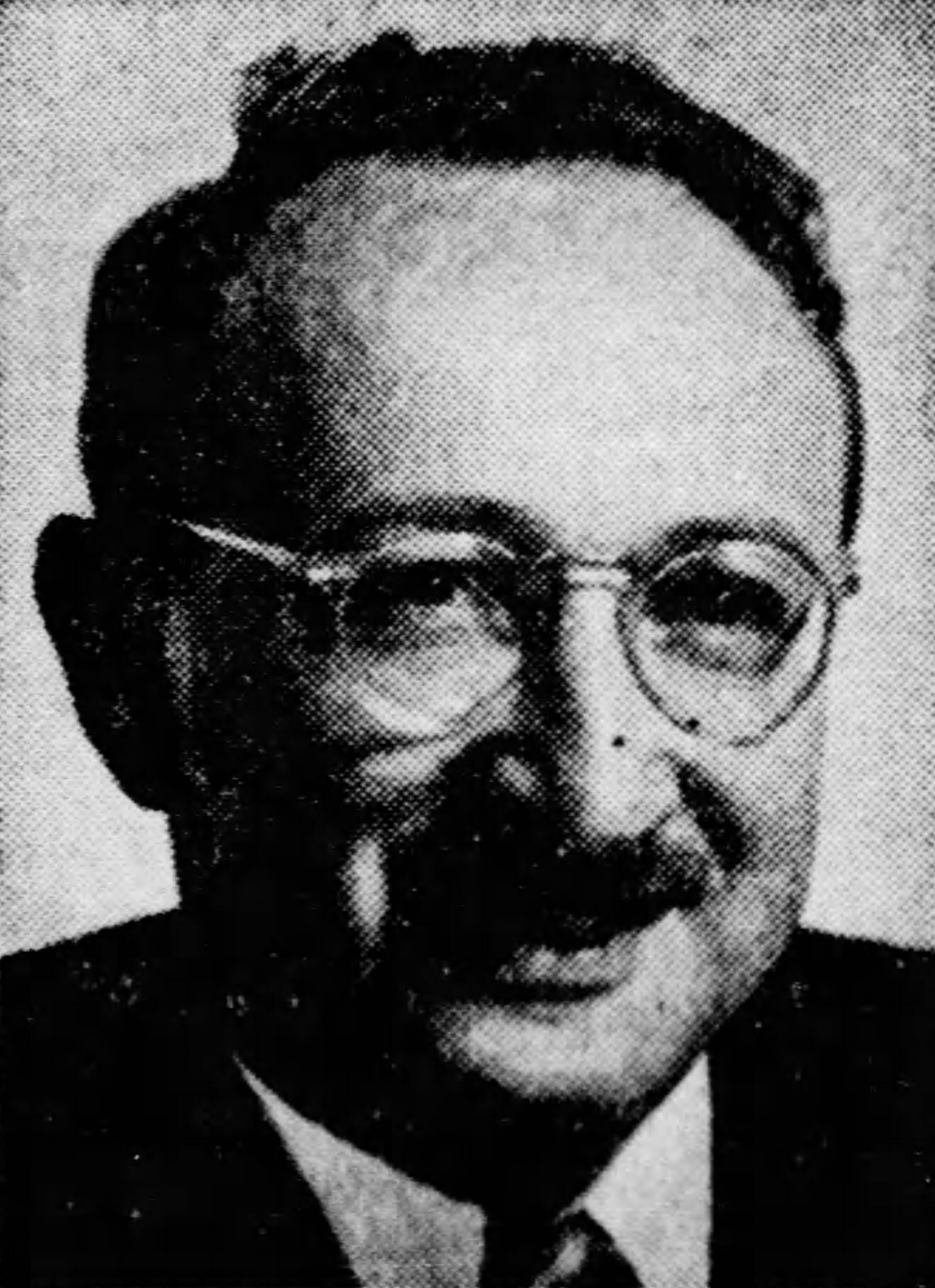
- Hook c. 1944
- Born: December 20, 1902; New York City, US
- Died: July 12, 1989 (aged 86); Stanford, California, US

Education
- Education: City College of New York; Columbia University
- Doctoral advisor: John Dewey
- Other advisors: Morris Raphael Cohen; Frederick J. E. Woodbridge

Philosophical work
- Era: 20th-century philosophy
- Region: Western philosophy
- School: Naturalism; Pragmatism; Marxism (early)
- Institutions: New York University
- Main interests: Political philosophy, philosophy of education
- Notable ideas: Ethics of controversy

Sidney Hook (December 20, 1902 – July 12, 1989) was an American philosopher of pragmatism known for his contributions to the philosophy of history, the philosophy of education, political theory, and ethics. After embracing communism in his youth, Hook was later known for his criticisms of totalitarianism, both fascism and communism. A social democrat, Hook sometimes cooperated with conservatives, particularly in opposing Marxism–Leninism. After World War II, he argued that members of such groups as the Communist Party USA and Leninists like democratic centralists could ethically be barred from holding the offices of public trust because they called for the violent overthrow of democratic governments.

== Background ==
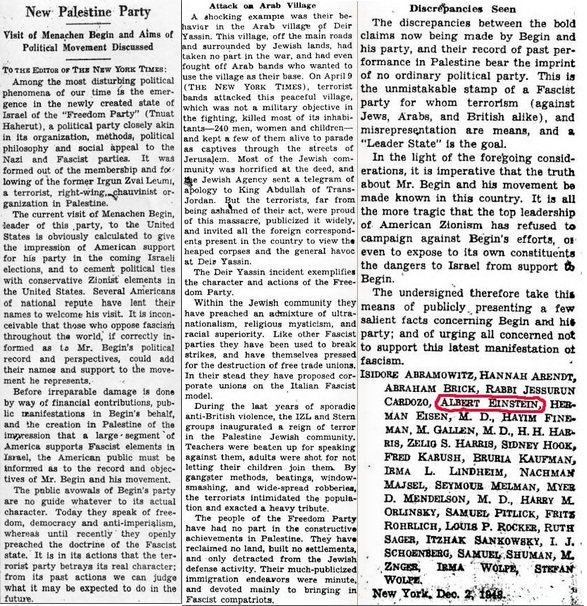
Albert Einstein, Sidney Hook et al. signed a 4 December 1948 letter published in the New York Times

Sidney Hook was born on December 20, 1902, in Brooklyn, New York City, to Jennie and Isaac Hook, Austrian Jewish immigrants. He became a supporter of the Socialist Party of America during the Debs era when he was in high school.

In 1923, he earned a BA at the City College of New York and in 1927 Ph.D. at Columbia University, where he studied under pragmatist philosopher John Dewey.

== Career ==
In 1926, Hook became a professor of philosophy at New York University and was head of the Department of Philosophy from 1948 to 1969. He retired from the university in 1972.

In 1931, Hook began teaching at the New School for Social Research through 1936, after which he taught night school there until the 1960s. By 1933, Hook and New School colleague Horace M. Kallen were serving also on the ACLU's academic freedom committee.

=== Marxist ===
At the beginning of his career, Hook was a prominent expert on Karl Marx's philosophy and was himself a Marxist. He attended the lectures of Karl Korsch in Berlin in 1928 and conducted research at the Marx-Engels Institute in Moscow in the summer of 1929. At first, he wrote enthusiastically about the Soviet Union, and, in 1932, supported the Communist Party's candidate, William Z. Foster, when he ran for President of the United States. However, Hook broke completely with the Comintern in 1933, holding its policies responsible for the triumph of Nazism in Germany. He accused Joseph Stalin of putting "the needs of the Russian state" over the needs of the international revolution.

However, Hook remained active in some of the causes of the Marxist left during the Great Depression. In 1933, with James Burnham, Hook was one of the organizers of the American Workers Party, led by the Dutch-born pacifist minister A.J. Muste. Hook also debated the meaning of Marxism with radical Max Eastman in a series of public exchanges. Eastman, like Hook, had studied under John Dewey at Columbia University. In the late 1930s, Hook assisted Leon Trotsky in his efforts to clear his name in a special Commission of Inquiry headed by Dewey, which investigated charges made against Trotsky during the Moscow Trials.

=== Anti-communist ===
The Great Purge encouraged Hook's increasing ambivalence toward Marxism. In 1939, Hook formed the Committee for Cultural Freedom, a short-lived organization that set the stage for his postwar politics by opposing "totalitarianism" on the left and right. By the Cold War, Hook had become a prominent anti-Communist, although he continued to consider himself both a democratic socialist and a secular humanist throughout his life. He was, therefore, an anti-Communist socialist. In 1973, he was one of the signers of the Humanist Manifesto II.

In the late 1940s and early 1950s, Hook helped found Americans for Intellectual Freedom, the Congress for Cultural Freedom (CCF), and the American Committee for Cultural Freedom. These bodies—of which the CCF was most central—were funded in part by the Central Intelligence Agency through a variety of fronts and sought to dissuade American leftists from continuing to advocate cooperation with the Soviet Union as some had previously. Hook later wrote in his memoirs that he, "like almost everyone else," had heard that "the CIA was making some contribution to the financing of the Congress."

On February 6, 1953, Hook discussed "The Threat to Academic Freedom" with Victor Riesel and others in the evening on WEVD radio (a Socialist radio station whose call letters referred to SPA founder Eugene V. Debs). In May 1953, the John Day Company published Heresy, Yes–Conspiracy, No, a 283-page book expanded from a 1952 pamphlet (Heresy, Yes–Conspiracy, No!), itself expanded from a 1950 New York Times article called "Heresy, Yes–But Conspiracy, No."

In the 1960s, Hook was a frequent critic of the New Left. He was opposed to a unilateral withdrawal of U.S. forces from the Vietnam War and defended California Governor Ronald Reagan's removal of Angela Davis from her professorship at UCLA because of her leadership role in the Communist Party USA.

In 1963 he joined the Freedom House-initiated organisation, Citizens Committee for a Free Cuba, an anti-Castro organization.

Hook was elected a fellow of the American Academy of Arts and Sciences in 1965 and ended his career in the 1970s and 1980s as a fellow of the conservative Hoover Institution in Stanford, California.

=== Later years ===
The National Endowment for the Humanities selected Hook for the 1984 Jefferson Lecture, the U.S. government's highest honor for achievement in the humanities. Hook's lecture was entitled "Education in Defense of a Free Society."

=== Personal life and death ===
Hook was a lifelong agnostic.

He married Carrie Katz in 1924, with whom he had one son. The couple separated in 1933. Katz had studied at the Rand School in the early 1920s. There, she studied under Scott Nearing and came to write a chapter in his book The Law of Social Revolution entitled "The Russian Revolution of 1917" (1926). Friends from the Rand School included Nerma Berman Oggins, wife of Cy Oggins. She was a Communist Party member who was a "Fosterite" (i.e., she supported William Z. Foster amidst Party factionalism in the last 1920s). She went on to work at the Labor Defense Council. In 1935, Hook married Ann Zinken, with whom he had two children.

Hook died age 86 on July 12, 1989, in Stanford, California.

== Awards ==
- 1984: In Praise of Reason Award from the Committee for the Scientific Investigation of Claims of the Paranormal (CSICOP). awarded by CSICOP Chairman Paul Kurtz
- 1985: Presidential Medal of Freedom by President Ronald Reagan (May 23, 1985)

== Legacy ==
Hook's memoir, Out of Step, recounts his life, his activism for a number of educational causes, his controversies with other intellectuals such as Noam Chomsky, and his recollections of Mortimer J. Adler, Bertolt Brecht, Morris Cohen, John Dewey, Max Eastman, Albert Einstein and Bertrand Russell.

In October 2002, a conference marking the centennial of Hook's birth was organized by Matthew Cotter and Robert Talisse and held at the City University of New York Graduate Center in Manhattan.

In April 2011 the Committee for Skeptical Inquiry (CSI) (formerly known as CSICOP) again honored Hook. At a meeting of its executive council in Denver, Colorado he was selected for inclusion in their Pantheon of Skeptics. The Pantheon of Skeptics was created by CSI to remember the legacy of deceased fellows of CSI and their contributions to the cause of scientific skepticism.

=== Hero in History ===
Sidney Hook's book The Hero in History was a noticeable event in the studies devoted to the role of the hero, the Great Man in history and the influence of people of significant accomplishments.

Hook opposed all forms of determinism and argued, as had William James, that humans play a creative role in constructing the social world and to transforming their natural environment. Neither humanity nor its universe is determined or finished. For Hook this conviction was crucial. He argued that when a society is at the crossroads of choosing the direction of further development, an individual can play a dramatic role and even become an independent power on whom the choice of the historical pathway depends.

In his book, Hook provided a great number of examples of the influence of great people, and the examples are mostly associated with various crucial moments in history, such as revolutions and crises. Some scholars have critically responded because, as one of them claims, "he does not take into account that an individual's greatest influence can be revealed not so much in the period of the old regime's collapse, but in the formation period of a new one. [...] Besides, he did not make clear the situation when alternatives appear either as the result of a crisis or as the result of Great Man's plan or intention without [a] manifested crisis".

Hook introduced a theoretical division of historic personalities and especially leaders into the eventful man and the event-making man, depending on their influences on the historical process. For example, he considers Lenin as having been an event-making man, because of his having acted in an important circumstance to change the developmental direction not only of Russia but also of the whole world in the 20th century.

Hook attached great importance to accidents and contingencies in history, thus opposing, among others, Herbert Fisher, who made attempts to present history as "waves" of emergencies.

=== "The Ethics of Controversy" ===
In 1954, Hook published an essay titled "The Ethics of Controversy" in which he set down ten ground rules for democratic discourse within a democracy.

== Works ==
=== Books ===
- The Metaphysics of Pragmatism Chicago, The Open Court Publishing Company, 1927.
- Towards the Understanding of Karl Marx: A Revolutionary Interpretation New York City: John Day Company, 1933.
- Christianity and Marxism: A Symposium New York City: Polemic Publishers, 1934.
- The Meaning of Marx, an edited collection, 1934.
- From Hegel to Marx, 1936.
- John Dewey: An Intellectual Portrait, 1939.
- Reason, Social Myths, and Democracy, 1940.
- The Hero in History: A Study in Limitation and Possibility, 1943.
- Education for Modern Man, 1946.
- John Dewey: Philosopher of Science and Freedom, Hook, editor, 1950.
- Heresy, Yes–Conspiracy, No, 1953 (originally published as soft-back in 1952 by American Committee for Cultural Freedom)
- Marx and the Marxists: The Ambiguous Legacy, 1955.
- Common Sense and the Fifth Amendment New York City: Criterion Books, 1957.
- Political power and personal freedom: critical studies in democracy, communism, and civil rights, New York City: Criterion Books, 1959.
- The Quest for Being, and Other Studies in Naturalism and Humanism, 1961.
- The Fail-Safe Fallacy, 1962.
- The Paradoxes of Freedom, 1963.
- The Place of Religion in a Free Society, 1968.
- Academic Freedom and Academic Anarchy, 1970.
- Pragmatism and the Tragic Sense of Life, 1974.
- Philosophy and public policy, 1980.
- Marxism and Beyond, 1983.
- Out of Step, 1987.
- Convictions, 1990.
- Sidney Hook on Pragmatism, Democracy, and Freedom: The Essential Essays, Robert B. Talisse and Robert Tempio (eds.), Amherst: Prometheus Books, 2002.
- World communism: key documentary material , 1990.

=== Articles ===
- "Karl Marx and Moses Hess" (December 1934), New International, via Marxists Internet Archive
- "Marx's Criticism of 'True Socialism'" (January 1935), New International, via Marxists Internet Archive
- "Marx and Feuerbach" (April 1936), New International, via Marxists Internet Archive
- "Academic Integrity and Academic Freedom", Commentary Magazine (1949)
- "Heresy, Yes—But Conspiracy, No", The New York Times (1950)
- "A Reply to the Editors' 'In Justice to Mr. Conant'", New York Times (typescript March 15, 1953)

=== Articles for New Leader ===
Hook's papers at Stanford include the following articles:

- "Where the News Ends" (November 26, 1938)
- "John Dewey at Eighty" (October 28, 1939)
- "Socialists Face Need of Unified Action" (March 9, 1940)
- "Social Change and Original Sin" (November 8, 1941)
- "Russia's Military Successes Do Not Whitewash Crimes at Home" (January 31, 1942)
- "An Apologist for St. John's College" (November 25, 1944)
- "The Degradation of the Word" (January 27, 1945)
- "Freedom and Socialism: Reply to Max Eastman" (March 3, 1945)
- "Reflections on the Nuremberg Trial: A Summary Court-Martial for Nazi Criminals" (November 17, 1945)
- "Fin du Mondisme: The Birth of a New World Mood in Face of Atombomb" (January 23, 1946)
- "An Unanswered Letter to the American Jewish Congress" (July 5, 1947)
- "Mr. Fly's Web of Confusions: An Analysis of a Befuddled Decision" (October 18, 1947)
- "Mr. Fly Entangles Himself More Deeply" (November 22, 1947)
- "The State: Servile or Free?" (March 13, 1948)
- "John Dewey at Ninety: The Man and His Philosophy" (October 22, 1949)
- "Communists in the Colleges"(May 6, 1950)
- "Encounter in Berlin" (October 14, 1950)
- "Russia by Moonshine" Part 1 (November 12, 1951)
- "Russia by Moonshine" Part 2 (November 19, 1951)
- "Is America in the Grip of Hysteria?" (Editorial reply to Bertrand Russell) (March 3, 1952)
- "Letter to an English Friend" (October 13, 1952)
- "Fall of the Town of Usher", (October 27, 1952)
- "Lattimore on the Moscow Trials" (November 10, 1952)
- "A Trans-Atlantic Dialogue" (December 8, 1952)
- "Should We Stress Armaments or Political Warfare?" (February 23, 1953)
- "Indoctrination and Academic Freedom" (March 9, 1953)
- "Freedom in American Culture" (April 6, 1953)
- "The Party Line in Psychology" (May 25, 1953)
- "The Ethics of Controversy" (February 1, 1954)
- "The Techniques of Controversy" (March 8, 1954)
- "Robert Hutchins Rides Again" (April 19, 1954)
- "The Substance of Controversy" (May 24, 1954)
- "Uncommon Sense about Security and Freedom" (June 21, 1954)
- "The Ethics of Controversy Again" (January 16, 1956)
- "The Strategy of Truth" February 13, 1956)
- "Six Fallacies of Robert Hutchins" (March 19, 1956)
- "Hutchins" (April 23, 1956)
- "Prospects for Cultural Freedom" (May 7, 1956)
- "The AAUP and Academic Integrity" (May 21, 1956)
- "Academic Freedom" (June 4, 1956)
- "Logic and the Fifth Amendment" (October 1, 1956)
- "Psychology and the Fifth Amendment" (October 8, 1956)
- "Ethics and the Fifth Amendment" (October 15, 1956)
- "Politics and the Fifth Amendment" (October 22, 1956)
- "Logic, History and Law" (November 5, 1956)
- "Abraham Lincoln, American Pragmatist" (March 18, 1957)
- "The Fifth Amendment: A Crucial Case" (April 22, 1957)
- "The Atom and Human Wisdom" (June 3, 1957)
- "The Old Liberalism: The New Conservative" (July 8, 1957)
- "Marx, Dewey and Lincoln" (October 21, 1957)
- "Justice Black's Illogic" (December 2, 1957)
- "Pragmatism" (December 9, 1957)
- "A Debate on Pragmatism: Marx, Dewey and Eastman" (February 10, 1958)
- "A Foreign Policy for Survival" (April 7, 1958)
- "A Free Man's Choice" (May 26, 1958)
- "Bertrand Russell Retreats" (July 1958)
- "Education in Japan" (November 24, 1958)

=== Occasional papers ===
- Lecture by Sidney Hook on "Freedom, Determinism and Sentimentality" (annual Horace M. Kallen Lectureship) (November 21, 1957)

== See also ==
- American philosophy
- List of American philosophers
- Heresy, Yes–Conspiracy, No
