= Roger Cooper (politician) =

American politician

Member of the Minnesota House of Representatives from the 21B and 15B district
- In office January 6, 1987 – January 6, 1997
- Preceded by: Gaylin Den Ouden
- Succeeded by: Gary Kubly

Personal details
- Born: November 8, 1944 (age 81)
- Party: Democratic Farmer Labor Party
- Spouse(s): Margie, Clare, 2014
- Education: Rockford College; Minnesota State University, Mankato
- Occupation: teacher, politician

Roger M. Cooper (born November 8, 1944) is a Minnesota politician and a former member of the Minnesota House of Representatives from southwestern Minnesota. First elected in 1986 in the Democratic-Farmer-Labor Party's "firestorm" that swept through the region, giving Democrats unprecedented control of southwestern Minnesota for the next several election cycles, Cooper served five terms. He was re-elected in 1988, 1990, 1992 and 1994. He represented the old District 21B and, later, District 15B, which included all or portions of Chippewa, Kandiyohi, McLeod, Meeker, Renville, Sibley and Yellow Medicine counties, changing somewhat through redistricting in 1990.

From the small town of Bird Island, Cooper, a public school history teacher, earned a reputation as a strong advocate for education, farmers and agricultural issues during his time in office. After his service in the legislature concluded, he served on the Minnesota Region 6E Development Commission and, more recently, was appointed to fill a vacancy on the Bird Island City Council. He was subsequently elected to that position in November 2006.

While in the legislature, Cooper was a member of the House Agriculture, Health & Human Services, Transportation & Transit, Local Government & Metropolitan Affairs, and Economic Development & Governmental Operations committees, and of various sub-committees relevant to each area.

In 2007, the Minnesota Legislature renamed an incentive program for Minnesota's emergency service personnel in honor of Cooper, who is undergoing treatment for thyroid cancer, and former Minnesota State Senator Dallas Sams, who died in 2007 after a long battle with brain cancer. The program is now known as the Cooper/Sams Volunteer Ambulance Program. Both Cooper and Sams invested a great deal of time into ensuring the passage of the original incentive program through the legislature in 1993.
