= Litchfield Township, Meeker County, Minnesota =

Litchfield Township, Minnesota
- Township
- Location within the state of Minnesota Litchfield Township, Minnesota (the United States)
- Coordinates: 45°7′N 94°33′W
- Country: United States
- State: Minnesota
- County: Meeker

Area
  - Total: 33.9 sq mi (87.9 km^{2})
  - Land: 31.7 sq mi (82.2 km^{2})
  - Water: 2.2 sq mi (5.7 km^{2})
- Elevation: 1,150 ft (350 m)

Population (2000)
  - Total: 808
  - Density: 25/sq mi (9.8/km^{2})
- Time zone: UTC-6 (Central (CST))
  - Summer (DST): UTC-5 (CDT)
- ZIP code: 55355
- Area code: 320
- FIPS code: 27-37466
- GNIS feature ID: 0664798

Litchfield Township is a township in Meeker County, Minnesota, United States. The population was 808 at the 2000 census. The township includes most of the city of Litchfield, except for a small protrusion northeast into Forest City Township and another small one due east into Darwin Township.

== Geography ==
According to the United States Census Bureau, the township itself has a total area of 33.9 square miles (87.9 km^{2}), of which 31.7 square miles (82.2 km^{2}) is land and 2.2 square miles (5.7 km^{2}) (6.48%) is water.

Litchfield Township is located in Township 119 North of the Arkansas Base Line and Range 31 West of the 5th Principal Meridian.

== History ==
Litchfield Township was originally called Ness Township, for settler Ole Halvorson Ness, and under the latter name was organized in 1858. The present name, adopted circa 1869, is after its largest settlement, Litchfield.

== Demographics ==
As of the census of 2000, there were 808 people, 288 households, and 237 families residing in the township. The population density was 25.5 inhabitants per square mile (9.8/km^{2}). There were 325 housing units at an average density of 10.2 per square mile (3.9/km^{2}). The racial makeup of the township was 99.13% White, 0.37% Native American, 0.25% Asian, and 0.25% from two or more races. Hispanic or Latino of any race were 0.50% of the population.

There were 288 households, out of which 37.5% had children under the age of 18 living with them, 75.7% were married couples living together, 4.2% had a female householder with no husband present, and 17.7% were non-families. 14.2% of all households were made up of individuals, and 4.9% had someone living alone who was 65 years of age or older. The average household size was 2.81 and the average family size was 3.11.

In the township the population was spread out, with 29.3% under the age of 18, 5.3% from 18 to 24, 27.2% from 25 to 44, 27.8% from 45 to 64, and 10.3% who were 65 years of age or older. The median age was 38 years. For every 100 females, there were 108.2 males. For every 100 females age 18 and over, there were 100.4 males.

The median income for a household in the township was $57,885, and the median income for a family was $60,893. Males had a median income of $40,365 versus $23,375 for females. The per capita income for the township was $22,203. About 2.8% of families and 2.7% of the population were below the poverty line, including 1.6% of those under age 18 and 10.3% of those age 65 or over.
