= David Edmonds (philosopher) =

British philosopher

David Edmonds (born 1964) is a British philosopher, and a radio feature maker at the BBC World Service. He studied at Oxford University, has a PhD in philosophy from the Open University, and has held fellowships at the University of Chicago and the University of Michigan. Edmonds is the author of Caste Wars: A Philosophy of Discrimination and co-author with John Eidinow of Wittgenstein's Poker: The Story of a Ten-Minute Argument Between Two Great Philosophers and Bobby Fischer Goes to War: How the Soviets Lost the Most Extraordinary Chess Match of All Time.

With Nigel Warburton he produces the popular podcast series, Philosophy Bites.

He also presents the Philosophy 24/7 podcast series produced by Hugh Fraser of the Storynory podcast, and consults with Michael Chaplin on the BBC radio plays The Ferryhill Philosophers.

He has also written a book on the trolley problem, entitled Would You Kill the Fat Man?, whereby he outlines the problem and several of its variations, providing a rounded view on the trolley problem whilst analysing many ethical theories and how they would respond to the trolley problem.

== Selected works ==
- Wittgenstein's Poker: The Story of a Ten-Minute Argument Between Two Great Philosophers, Faber & Faber, 2001. ISBN 978-0-571-20909-5
- Bobby Fischer Goes to War: How the Soviets Lost the Most Extraordinary Chess Match of All Time. 2004. HarperCollins Publishers. ISBN 0060510242
- Rousseau's Dog: Two Great Thinkers at War in the Age of Enlightenment. 2006. ISBN 978-0060744915
- Caste Wars: A Philosophy of Discrimination, Routledge, 2006. ISBN 978-0-415-38537-4
- Would You Kill the Fat Man? The Trolley Problem and What Your Answer Tells Us about Right and Wrong, Princeton University Press, 2013. ISBN 9781400848386
- Undercover Robot, My First Year as a Human with Bertie Fraser, Walker Books, 2020. ISBN 978-1406388664
- The Murder of Professor Schlick: The Rise and Fall of the Vienna Circle, Princeton University Press, 2020. ISBN 978-0691-16490-8
- Parfit: A Philosopher and His Mission to Save Morality, Princeton University Press, 2023. ISBN 978-0-691-22523-4
- Death in a Shallow Pond: A Philosopher, a Drowning Child, and Strangers in Need, Princeton University Press, 2025. ISBN 978-0-691-25402-9
