= Horace Kallen =

American philosopher (1882–1974)

- Born: Horace Meyer Kallen; August 11, 1882; Bernstadt, Silesia, Kingdom of Prussia, German Empire (now Bierutów, Lower Silesian Voivodeship, Poland)
- Died: February 16, 1974 (aged 91); Palm Beach, Florida, US

Education
- Education: Harvard University; University of Oxford
- Thesis: Notes on the Nature of Truth (1908)
- Doctoral advisor: William James

Horace Meyer Kallen (August 11, 1882 – February 16, 1974) was an American philosopher who supported pluralism and Zionism.

== Biography ==
Horace Meyer Kallen was born on August 11, 1882, in the town of Bernstadt, Prussian Silesia (now Bierutów, Lower Silesian Voivodeship, Poland). His parents were Jacob David Kallen, an Orthodox rabbi, and Esther Rebecca Glazier. In 1887, the family emigrated to the United States. Kallen studied philosophy at Harvard University under George Santayana; in 1903, he received a B.A., magna cum laude.

That same year, Kallen was personally hired by future American President Woodrow Wilson, then Princeton University's president, to become the first Jew to ever teach at the university. But after teaching English at Princeton for two years, his contract was not renewed, and he returned to Harvard for graduate study and worked as Santayana's assistant. In 1908, Kallen received his doctorate and was awarded a Sheldon Travelling Fellowship to study at Oxford University. He was also a lifetime friend of Alain Locke, whom he met at Harvard and who was the first African-American Rhodes Scholar; and would remain the only one until the 1960s.

He lectured in philosophy at Harvard from his graduation until 1911, occasionally working as a logic instructor at Clark College in Worcester, Massachusetts. In 1911, he moved to teach philosophy at the University of Wisconsin–Madison until 1918, when he was named a professor at The New School in New York City as a founding member, where he remained for the rest of his career. By 1933, Kallen and his colleague Sidney Hook were serving on the ACLU's academic freedom committee.

A pluralist, Kallen opposed any oversimplification of philosophical and vital problems. According to Kallen, denying complications and difficulties is to multiply them, as much as to deny reality to evil would aggravate evil. Kallen advanced the ideal that cultural diversity and national pride were compatible with each other and that ethnic and racial diversity strengthened America. Kallen is credited with coining the term cultural pluralism.

He was acquainted with William James, whose last unfinished book he edited. In 1939 he became acquainted with Immanuel Velikovsky and became a lifelong friend, informal literary advisor, mentor, and advocate. He was a member of the American Philosophical Society, the Western Philosophical Society, the Society for Psychical Research, the Zionist Organization of America, the Palestine Development Council, and the National Council of the League of Nations Association. He served on congressional committees on international peace and was a part of many think tanks and study groups on questions ranging from philosophy and law to labor relations.

Kallen married Rachel Oatman van Arsdale in 1926. He died, aged 91, on February 16, 1974, in Palm Beach, Florida.

== Blasphemy case ==
In 1928, Kallen spoke at a memorial service for Sacco and Vanzetti in Boston, during which he stated that if Sacco and Vanzetti had been anarchists, then so was Jesus. An arrest warrant was subsequently filed against him on charges of blasphemy under a 17th-century law; however, a judge ruled that his statement had not been criminal.

== Selected works ==
Books include:

- Democracy Versus the Melting-Pot, 1915.
- Zionism and World Politics, William Heinemann, 1921.
- Education, the Machine and the Worker: An Essay in the Psychology of Education in Industrial Society, 1925.
- Indecency and the Seven Arts:And Other Adventures of a Pragmatist in Aesthetics, 1930.
- College Prolongs Infancy, John Day (1932)
- Individualism: An American Way of Life (1933)
- Decline and Rise of the Consumer, 1936. (via archive.org)
- Art and Freedom, 1942.
- Modernity and Liberty, 1947.
- The Liberal Spirit, 1948.
- Ideals and Experience, 1948.
- The Education of Free Men, 1950.
- Patterns of Progress, 1950.
- Secularism is the will of God, 1954.
- "Of Them Which Say they Are Jews,": and Other Essays on the Jewish Struggle for Survival, Bloch Pub. Co., 1954.
- Cultural Pluralism and the American Idea, 1956.
- Utopians at Bay, 1958. (via archive.org)
- Liberty, Laughter, and Tears, 1968.
- Creativity, Imagination, Logic: Meditations for the Eleventh Hour, 1973.

Articles include:

- "Socrates and the Street Car," The Mid-West Quarterly, Vol. 1, No. 4, July 1914.
- "Democracy Versus the Melting-Pot: A Study of American Nationality," Part II, The Nation, Feb. 25, 1915.
- "Philosophers," The American Mercury, December 1926.
- "The Hither of the Beyond," The Bookman, February 1928.
- "Fear, Freedom, and Massachusetts," The American Mercury, November 1929.
- Seligman, Edwin R. A., ed. (1930). "Behaviorism". International Encyclopedia of the Social Sciences. Vol. 1. New York: The Macmillan Company. p. 495-498 – via Internet Archive.
- "American Philosophy Today and Tomorrow" with Sidney Hook in The Journal of Philosophy (1936)
- "Toward the Four Freedoms," The Saturday Review, May 23, 1942.
- "The War Against the Chain-Gang of Production," The Saturday Review, September 9, 1944.
- "Freedom and Experience" with Sidney Hook and Milton R. Konvitz in The Philosophical Review (1948)
- "How I Bet My Life" in The Saturday Review (October 1, 1966)

Bibliography: See special "Symposium on Horace M. Kallen" in Modern Judaism, Vol. 4, No. 2. (May, 1984)

== Festschrift ==
- Ratner, Sidney, ed. (1953). Vision & action : essays in honor of Horace M. Kallen on his 70th birthday. New Brunswick: Rutgers University Press. ISBN 0804603766.

== See also ==
- American philosophy
- List of American philosophers
