= Gary Kubly =

American politician (1943–2012)

Member of the Minnesota Senate from the 20th district
- In office January 7, 2003 – March 2, 2012
- Preceded by: Charles Berg

Member of the Minnesota House of Representatives from the 15B district
- In office January 7, 1997 – January 6, 2003
- Preceded by: Roger Cooper
- Succeeded by: Lyle Koenen

Personal details
- Born: November 12, 1943 Fort Dodge, Iowa
- Died: March 2, 2012 (aged 68) Saint Paul, Minnesota
- Party: Minnesota Democratic-Farmer-Labor Party
- Spouse: Patricia
- Children: 3
- Education: Minnesota State University, Mankato; Luther Theological Seminary
- Occupation: pastor, legislator

Gary W. Kubly (November 12, 1943 – March 2, 2012) was a Minnesota politician and a member of the Minnesota Senate who represented District 20, which includes portions of Big Stone, Chippewa, Kandiyohi, Lac qui Parle, Lincoln, McLeod, Meeker, Renville, Swift and Yellow Medicine counties in the west central part of the state. A Democrat, he was first elected to the Senate in 2002, and was re-elected in 2006 and 2010. Prior to that, he served in the Minnesota House of Representatives representing the old District 15B from 1997 to 2003.

Kubly was a member of the Senate's Agriculture and Veterans Committee and Capital Investment Committee. He also serves on the Finance subcommittees for the Agriculture and Veterans Budget and Policy Division, the Economic Development and Housing Budget Division, the Environment, Energy and Natural Resources Budget Division, the Environment, Energy and Natural Resources Budget Division-Energy Subdivision (which he chairs), and the State Government Budget Division. His special legislative concerns include agriculture, rural communities, rural education, rural health care, rural transportation, energy, jobs, and education.

Kubly obtained his B.A. degree from Minnesota State University, Mankato. He also served in the United States Air Force from 1966 to 1968, during which time he worked in the research division of the School of Aerospace Medicine. After serving as a public school teacher from 1968 to 1970, he went on to Luther Theological Seminary, where he obtained his M.Div. degree. A Lutheran pastor, he and his wife, Patricia, are the parents of three children.

In 2010, Kubly was diagnosed with amyotrophic lateral sclerosis or Lou Gehrig's disease. On February 29, 2012, he was admitted to Regions Hospital in Saint Paul during a "medical crisis" and was listed in "critical condition." He died on Friday, March 2, 2012.
