= American Committee for Cultural Freedom =

The American Committee for Cultural Freedom (ACCF) was the U.S. affiliate of the anti-Communist Congress for Cultural Freedom (CCF).

The ACCF and CCF were organizations that, during the Cold War, sought to encourage intellectuals to be critical of the Soviet Union and Communism, and to combat, according to a writer for The New York Times, "the continuing strength of the Soviet myth among the Western cultural elite. Despite all that had happened - the Moscow show trials, the Nazi-Soviet pact, the assassination of Leon Trotsky, the Russian attack on Finland, the takeovers in Eastern Europe, the mounting evidence of the gulag - Joseph Stalin still retained the loyalty of many writers, artists and scientists who viewed the Soviet Union as a progressive alternative to the 'reactionary,' 'war-mongering' United States." The CCF was funded by the CIA, as well as the ACCF (via the CIA officer James Burnham and front organizations like the National Committee for a Free Europe (NCFE).

Within the American committee, ex-communist intellectuals affirmed most vehemently the need for resistance to communism: Franz Borkenau (member of the Communist Party of Austria until 1929), Sidney Hook (Communist fellow traveler in the 1920s); Arthur Koestler (member of the Communist Party of Germany from 1931 to 1938) and James Burnham (member of the Fourth International from 1934 to 1940). Koestler and Borkenau fully supported the idea of setting up a frontal opposition movement to international communism. Burnham even spoke out in favor of the manufacture of American atomic bombs.

== Members ==
The dominant figure in the organization was Sidney Hook. Its 600-strong membership encompassed leading figures on both the Right and the Left, some of whom included:

1. Roger Baldwin
2. Daniel Bell
3. James Burnham
4. Alexander Calder
5. John Chamberlain
6. Whittaker Chambers
7. Elliot Cohen
8. Robert Gorham Davis (chairman 1953–1954)
9. Moshe Decter
10. John Dewey
11. John Dos Passos
12. Max Eastman
13. James T. Farrell
14. John Kenneth Galbraith
15. Clement Greenberg
16. Henry Hazlitt
17. Sidney Hook
18. Karl Jaspers
19. Elia Kazan
20. Irving Kristol
21. Melvin J. Lasky
22. Sol Levitas
23. Dwight Macdonald
24. Reinhold Niebuhr
25. Mary McCarthy
26. J. Robert Oppenheimer
27. William Phillips
28. Merlyn Pitzele
29. Jackson Pollock
30. David Riesman
31. Elmer Rice
32. James Rorty
33. Richard Rovere
34. Arthur M. Schlesinger, Jr.
35. George Schuyler
36. Sol Stein
37. Norman Thomas
38. Diana Trilling
39. James Wechsler
40. Leslie Fiedler

The committee's central or executive committee varied over time. James Burnham, who worked for the CIA, was a member until he left the group circa 1954. Whittaker Chambers joined in late 1954 and was also a member of the executive committee. Diana Trilling became chair person at some point.

== See also ==
- Congress for Cultural Freedom
- Anti-communism

== Sources ==
- Sidney Hook, Out of Step, Harper & Row, 1987.
- A Short History of the New York Intellectuals on PBS's Arguing the World
- American Institute of Physics
- Tamiment Library/Robert F. Wagner Labor Archives
- "Radical History" in The New Criterion (June 2002)
- "Revising the History of Cold War Liberals" in New Politics (Winter 2000)
- "The Mood of Three Generations" in The End of Ideology (2000)
- "Cranky Integrity on the Left" in The New York Times (August 27, 1989)
