= Philosophy Bites =

Philosophy podcast

- Genre: society and culture podcast, educational podcast

Cast and voices
- Hosted by: Nigel Warburton; David Edmonds

Publication
- No. of episodes: 411

Reception
- Ratings: 4/5

Related
- Website: www.philosophybites.com

Philosophy Bites is a podcast series featuring philosophers being interviewed for 15–20 minutes on a specific topic. The series, which has been running since 2007, is hosted by Nigel Warburton, freelance lecturer, and David Edmonds, and has featured interviews with guests including Barry C. Smith, Simon Blackburn, A. C. Grayling, Martha Nussbaum, Peter Singer, Kwame Anthony Appiah, Michael Dummett, Tzvetan Todorov, David Chalmers, and C. A. J. Coady. The podcast has been one of the top 20 most downloaded series in the United States and has over 34 million downloads.

== Books ==
Several of the episodes have been transcribed and compiled into three books, all published by Oxford University Press:

- Philosophy Bites (2010), features 25 of the series' best interviews.
- Philosophy Bites Back (2012), has 27 philosophers discuss the ideas and works of some of the most important thinkers in history.
- Philosophy Bites Again (2014), another selection of 27 interviews.
