= Nigel Warburton =

British philosopher (born 1962)

Nigel Warburton (/ˈwɔːrbərtən/; born 1962) is a British philosopher. He is best known as a populariser of philosophy, having written a number of books in the genre, but he has also written academic works in aesthetics and applied ethics.

== Education ==
Warburton received a BA from the University of Bristol and a PhD from Darwin College, Cambridge (supervised by Hugh Mellor), and was a lecturer at the University of Nottingham before joining the Department of Philosophy at the Open University in 1994. In May 2013, he resigned from the position of Senior Lecturer at the Open University.

== Career ==
He is the author of a number of introductory Philosophy books, including the bestselling Philosophy: The Basics (4th ed.), Philosophy: The Classics (4th ed.), and Thinking from A to Z (3rd ed.); he also edited Philosophy: Basic Readings (2nd ed.) and was the co-author of Reading Political Philosophy: Machiavelli to Mill. He has written extensively about photography, particularly about Bill Brandt, and wrote a biography of the modernist architect Ernő Goldfinger. He writes a weekly column "Everyday Philosophy" for The New European newspaper.

He runs a philosophy weblog Virtual Philosopher and with David Edmonds regularly podcasts interviews with top philosophers on a range of subjects at Philosophy Bites. He also podcasts chapters from his book Philosophy: The Classics. He has written for the Guardian newspaper. He is the Philosophy Editor for the literary website FiveBooks.

== Partial bibliography ==
- Philosophy: The Basics (4th ed.) ISBN 978-0-415-32773-2
- Philosophy: The Classics (4th ed.) ISBN 978-0-415-53466-6
- Thinking from A to Z (3rd ed.) ISBN 978-0-415-43371-6
- The Art Question ISBN 0-415-17490-2
- Ernö Goldfinger: The Life of An Architect
- Free Speech: A Very Short Introduction ISBN 978-0-19-923235-2
- Philosophy Bites (co-edited with David Edmonds) ISBN 978-0-19-957632-6; Philosophy Bites. 25 Philosophen sprechen über 25 große Themen (translated by Holger Hanowell), Reclam 2013
- Philosophy Bites Back (co-edited with David Edmonds) ISBN 978-0-19-969300-9; Auf den Schultern von Riesen. 27 Philosophen sprechen über ihre Lieblingsphilosophen (translated by Holger Hanowell), Reclam 2015
- A Little History of Philosophy ISBN 978-0-300-15208-1
- Hope: A New Beginning (An A. Gąsiewski Biography) ISBN 978-0-19-420696-9
- The Basics of Essay Writing. Routledge, 2006. ISBN 0-415-24000-X, 978-0-415-24000-0
