= Nancy Kates =

Independent filmmaker based in the San Francisco Bay area

Nancy Kates is an independent filmmaker based in the San Francisco Bay Area. She directed Regarding Susan Sontag, a feature documentary about the late essayist, novelist, director and activist. Through archival footage, interviews, still photographs and images from popular culture, the film reflects the boldness of Sontag's work and the cultural importance of her thought, and received funding from the National Endowment for the Humanities, the National Endowment for the Arts, the Foundation for Jewish Culture and the Sundance Documentary Film Program.

Kates is best known for her film Brother Outsider: The Life of Bayard Rustin, a full-length documentary she made with co-producer Bennett Singer about Bayard Rustin, the gay civil rights leader. The film premiered on the PBS series POV and at the 2003 Sundance Film Festival, and received numerous awards, including the 2004 GLAAD Media Award and audience awards at the major American gay and lesbian film festivals. It also received the award for best feature film at New York's New Festival and a number of jury prizes. "In the struggle for African-American dignity, Rustin was perhaps the most critical figure that many people have never heard of," says a review in TIME Magazine, "but neither mainstream society nor even the civil rights leadership could cope with his honesty." Hailed as "marvelous" by The Wall Street Journal, "packed with information" by The New York Times, and "beautifully crafted" by The Boston Globe, the Village Voice commends the film for "vividly bring[ing] back to life a man who deeply and brilliantly influenced the course of the civil rights and peace movements."

In 1995, Kates' master's thesis for Stanford University's film program, Their Own Vietnam, won a Student Academy Award in documentary. The film tells the stories of five American women who served in the Vietnam War, including a couple who met while serving. It presents a complex picture of their identities as women, using archival footage, home movies and snapshots. The film screened at the Sundance Film Festival, South by Southwest Film Festival, the Boston International Festival of Women's Cinema, and the Minneapolis-St. Paul International Film Festival among others, aired on public television, and received an award of merit from the International Documentary Association / David Wolper Awards. The Journal of American History praised the film, saying that the "complex melding of images from the Vietnam conflict culled from newsreel footage, snapshots, and military recruiting films with the jarringly honest recollections of five female veterans makes this an extremely compelling film," and LA Weekly praised it for its "transformations fraught with anger, pain, unimaginable guilt and sometimes joy - and the honesty with which they're brought to light."

Her previous films include Castro Cowboy, a short film about the late Marlboro model Christen Haren who died of AIDS in 1996, Joining the Tribe, Married People, and Going to Extremes. A 1984 honors graduate of Harvard University, Kates worked for several years at Harvard's Kennedy School of Government writing public policy case-studies. She is a former producer of the PBS series Computer Chronicles, and has worked as a producer, writer, and story consultant on various documentary projects. She also speaks frequently at schools, colleges and universities.

== Awards ==
Brother Outsider

- Outstanding Documentary. GLAAD Media Awards, 2004
- Silver Hugo Award. Chicago International Television Competition, 2004
- American Library Association Notable Videos for Adults, 2004
- Jury Award for Best Documentary. Icelandic Gay and Lesbian Film Festival, 2004
- CINE Golden Eagle, 2003
- Audience Award for Best Documentary. 27th San Francisco International Lesbian & Gay Film Festival, 2003
- Best Documentary. Cinequest San Jose Film Festival, 2003
- Outstanding Documentary Feature (tie). Outfest: Los Angeles Lesbian and Gay Film Festival, 2003
- Audience Award for Best Feature. New York Lesbian and Gay Film Festival, 2003
- Best Documentary Award. Turin International Gay and Lesbian Film Festival, 2003
- Jury Award for Best Documentary. Chicago Gay and Lesbian Film Festival, 2003
- Audience Award for Best Documentary. Philadelphia International Gay and Lesbian Film Festival, 2003
- First Prize in Documentary. Rhode Island Film Festival, 2003
- Jury Award for Best Documentary. Athens International Film Festival, 2003
- Audience Award for Best Documentary. Pittsburgh Lesbian and Gay Film Festival, 2003
- Audience Award for Best Documentary. Indianapolis Lesbian and Gay Film Festival, 2003

Their Own Vietnam

- Student Academy Award, Documentary. Academy of Motion Picture Arts and Sciences, 1995
- Certificate of Merit. David Wolper/International Documentary Association, 1995
- Merit Award. South by Southwest Film Festival, 1996
- Emerging Artists Award. Minneapolis/St. Paul International Film Festival, 1996
- Second Prize, Documentary. UFVA Film and Video Festival, 1996
- Athena Award (for achievement in Lesbian Film), Documentary, 1996
- Women's Programming Award. Humboldt International Film Festival, 1996
- Award of Merit. Sinking Creek Film Festival, Nashville, 1996

Castro Cowboy

- Director's Choice Award. Black Maria Film Festival, 1993
- Judge's Special Merit Award. New England Film and Video Festival, 1993
- Bronze Apple Award. National Educational Film and Video Festival, 1993

== Works ==
- Joining the Tribe
- Married People
- Going to Extremes
- Castro Cowboy (1992). 7 minutes
- Their Own Vietnam (1995). 23 minutes
- Vale of Tears (2002). 4 minutes
- Brother Outsider: The Life of Bayard Rustin (2003) 84 minutes
