= Peniel E. Joseph =

American scholar)

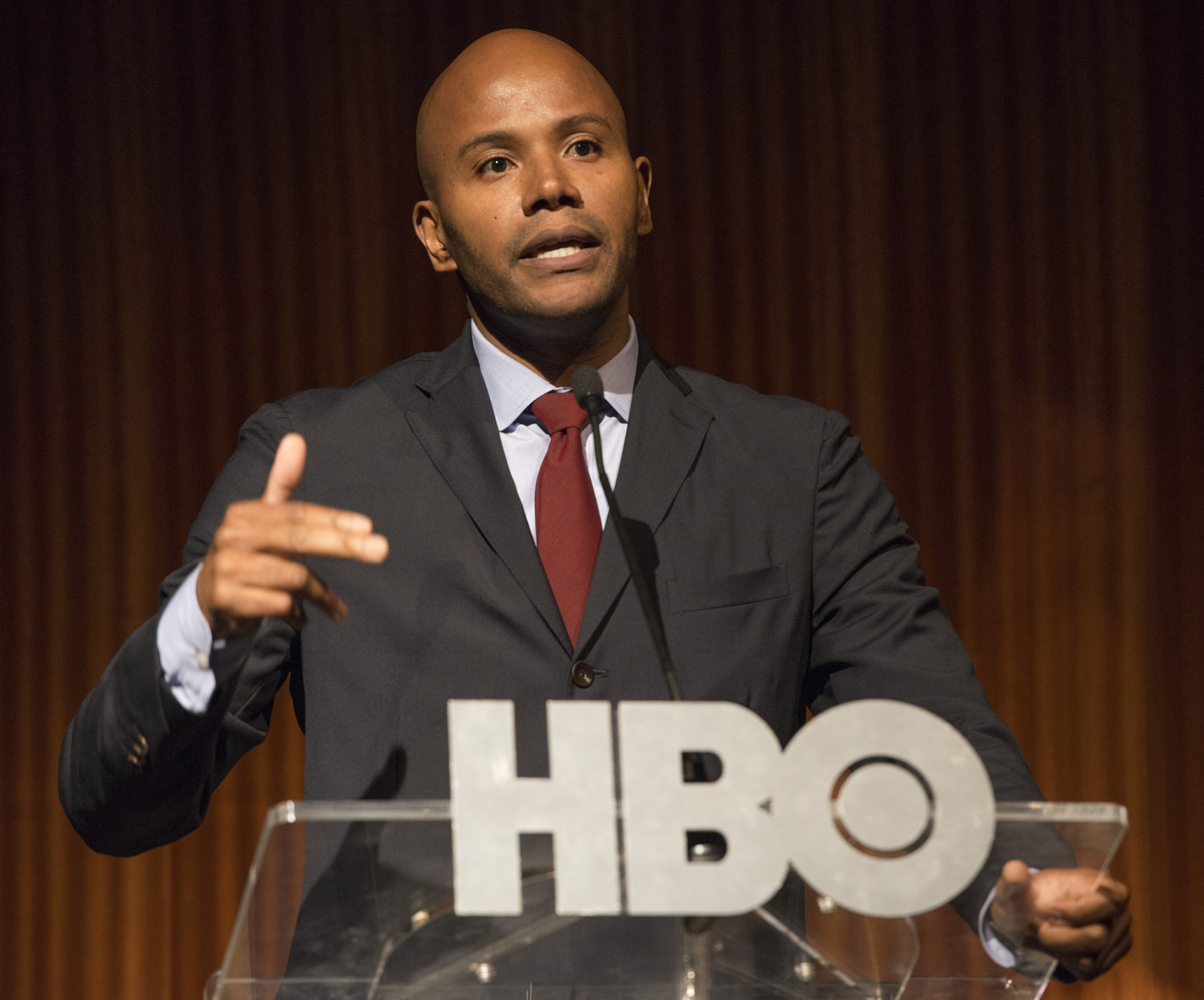
- Born: New York City, New York, United States
- Education: State University of New York at Stony Brook; Temple University
- Occupation: Historian

Peniel E. Joseph is an American historian, educator, and public speaker on race issues, especially the history of the Black power movement. He holds a joint professorship appointment at the LBJ School of Public Affairs and the History Department in at the University of Texas at Austin (UT Austin). Joseph joined UT Austin in 2015 from Tufts University in Massachusetts, where he had founded the school's Center for the Study of Race and Democracy (CSRD). He founded the second CSRD on the University of Texas campus in 2016, and is director of the center.

Joseph also serves as Vice President of the Board of Directors at the Bayard Rustin Center for Social Justice, an LGBTQIA community center named in honor of Bayard Rustin. At UT Austin, Joseph holds the Barbara Jordan Chair in Ethics and Political Values.

== Early years ==
Joseph was born and raised in New York City. His mother, a Haitian immigrant to the United States, was a major influence on his current work; she introduced him to Kwame Ture and other similar leaders during his upbringing.

Joseph attended the State University of New York at Stony Brook, where he earned a Bachelor of Arts degree in Africana studies and European history. He received a Ph.D. in American history from Temple University in 2000.

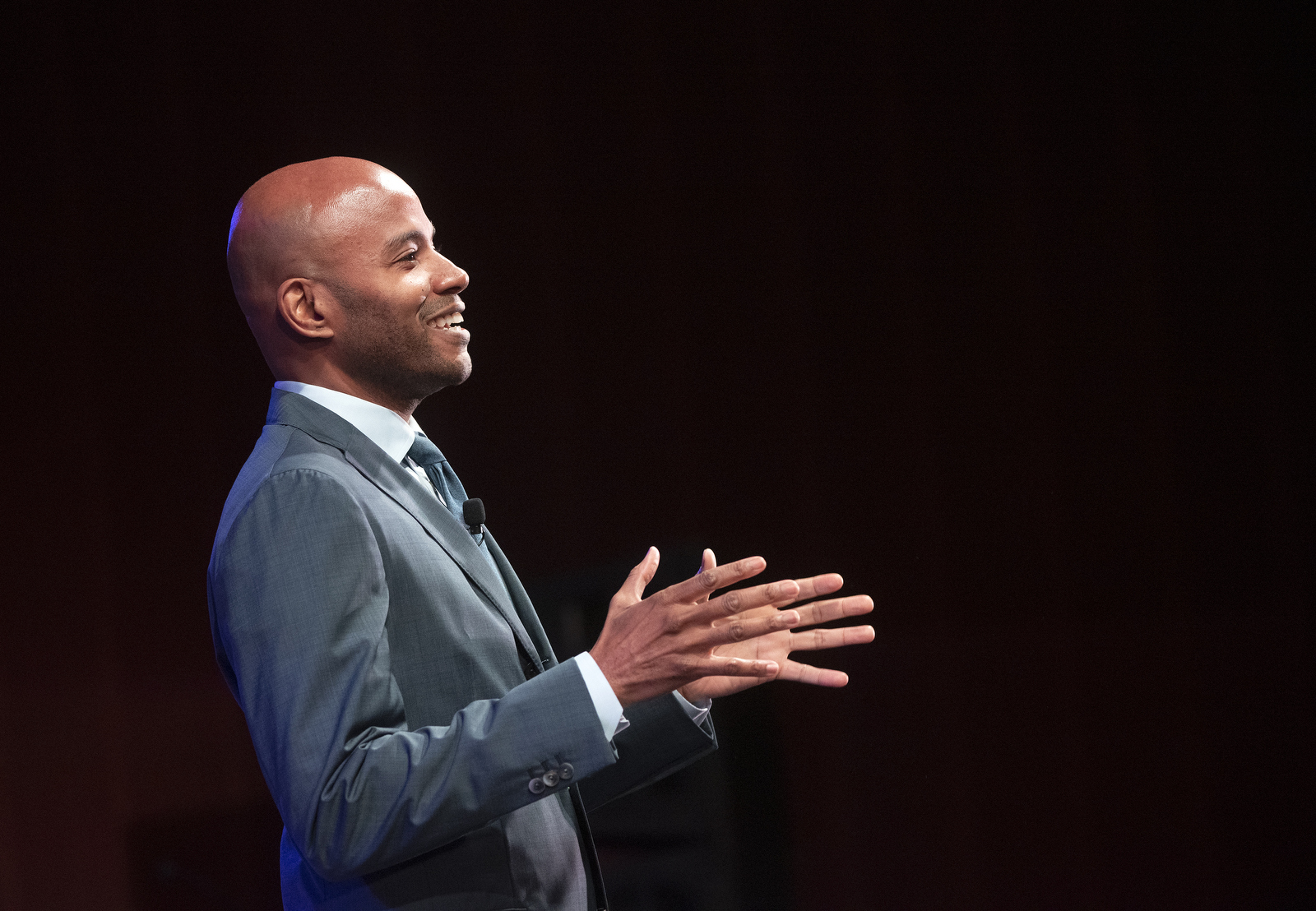
Joseph at the Lyndon Baines Johnson Presidential Library in 2019

== Career ==
Joseph is a leader of the Black power studies subfield of American history and American civil rights history, which encompasses interdisciplinary fields such as Africana studies, law and society, women’s and ethnic studies, and political science. He has served on the faculties of the University of Rhode Island, Stony Brook University, Brandeis University, and Tufts University.

His books include Waiting 'Til the Midnight Hour: A Narrative History of Black Power in America (2006), The Black Power Movement: Rethinking the Civil Rights-Black Power Era (as editor, 2006), The Sword and the Shield: The Revolutionary Lives of Malcolm X and Martin Luther King Jr. (2020, and The Third Reconstruction: America's Struggle for Racial Justice in the Twenty-First Century (2022).

== Recognition ==
According to The Journal of American History in 2010:

Over the last few years, by editing a number of important collections, penning several key articles, and writing a fine book, Peniel E. Joseph has emerged as a sort of dean of black power studies. His latest book challenges the conventional dichotomy between "civil rights" and "black power".

He is the recipient of fellowships from Harvard University's Charles Warren Center and Hutchins Center for African and African American Research; the Woodrow Wilson International Center for Scholars; and the Ford Foundation.

In July 2020, Joseph was appointed to the board of directors of the Bayard Rustin Center for Social Justice, an LGBTQIA community center located in Princeton, New Jersey.

== Publications ==
=== Author ===
- Waiting 'Til the Midnight Hour: A Narrative History of Black Power in America (2006), ISBN 978-0-80507-539-7.
- Dark Days, Bright Nights: From Black Power to Barack Obama (2010), ISBN 978-0-46501-366-1.
- Stokely: A Life (2014), ISBN 978-0-46501-363-0.
- The Sword and the Shield: The Revolutionary Lives of Malcolm X and Martin Luther King Jr. (2020), ISBN 978-1-54161-786-5.
- The Third Reconstruction: America's Struggle for Racial Justice in the Twenty-First Century (2022), ISBN 978-1-54160-074-4.
- Freedom Season: How 1963 Transformed America's Civil Rights Revolution (2025), ISBN 978-1-54167-589-6.

=== Editor ===
- The Black Power Movement: Rethinking the Civil Rights-Black Power Era (2006), ISBN 978-0-41594-595-0.
- Neighborhood Rebels: Black Power at the Local Level (2010), ISBN 978-0-23062-076-6.

== Media appearances ==
As a national commentator, Joseph has spoken at the 2008 Democratic and Republican National Conventions, PBS NewsHour, and C-SPAN. He has also appeared on NBC's Morning Joe and The Colbert Report.
