= Brother Outsider: The Life of Bayard Rustin =

2003 documentary film by Nancy Kates and Bennett Singer

- DVD cover
- Directed by: Nancy Kates; Bennett Singer
- Produced by: Nancy Kates; Bennett Singer
- Starring: Bayard Rustin; A.J. Muste; David McReynolds; Bob Dylan; Martin Luther King; Malcolm X
- Cinematography: Robert Shepard
- Edited by: Rhonda Collins; Veronica Selver; Gary Weimberg
- Music by: B. Quincy Griffin
- Production company: Question Why Films
- Distributed by: California Newsreel
- Release date: January 17, 2003 (Sundance Film Festival)
- Running time: 83 minutes
- Country: United States
- Language: English

Brother Outsider: The Life of Bayard Rustin is a 2003 American biographical documentary film co-produced and co-directed by Nancy Kates and Bennett Singer. The documentary recounts the life of Bayard Rustin, the African-American civil rights activist, notable for his activism for racial equality, gay rights, socialist issues, and organizing the 1963 March on Washington. Appearing in footage and interviews are Rustin, A.J. Muste, David McReynolds, Bob Dylan, Martin Luther King, Malcolm X, Stokely Carmichael, Lyndon B. Johnson and Robert F. Kennedy. The film premiered January 17, 2003 at the Sundance Film Festival and two days later on POV. The film earned numerous accolades at various festivals.

== Synopsis ==
The film relies on interviews, archival film footage, still photographs, and Rustin's own recordings from the 1970s. The film documents his high school days, his move to Harlem in 1937 where he joined Josh White and His Carolinians to support himself, his arrest in 1940 for being a conscientious objector, his association with the Communist Party, and his history as a homosexual, for which he was once arrested on suspicion of being a sexual pervert. It also highlights his time as an advisor to Martin Luther King Jr., the 1963 March on Washington, and footage of civil rights debates featuring Rustin, Malcolm X and Stokely Carmichael.

== Cast ==
Appearing as themselves

- Bayard Rustin
- Dorothy Jackson
- John Rodgers
- Louis John
- Bill Sutherland
- A.J. Muste
- George Hauser
- Davis Platt
- Adam Green
- Devi Prasad
- Rachelle Horowitz
- David McReynolds
- Robert Ascher
- Michael Thelwell
- Andrew Young
- Walter Naegle

Appearing in archive footage

- H. Rap Brown
- Stokely Carmichael
- Bob Dylan
- Mahalia Jackson
- Lyndon B. Johnson
- Robert F. Kennedy
- Martin Luther King
- Malcolm X
- Charles C. Owen
- A. Philip Randolph
- Strom Thurmond
- Roy Wilkins

== Production notes ==
Bennett Singer said he was worried there wouldn't be enough archival material to use in the film, but they found still photographs and some film footage of Rustin with Gandhi, Lyndon Johnson, Stokely Carmichael, and Malcolm X, which they slowed down and used in the documentary. Rustin's partner Walter Naegle also provided access to archival material he possessed. Singer said that Rustin was a talented singer as well, and had actually recorded two albums, and they were able to use his singing in the film as background music. Singer also disclosed that the FBI had monitored Rustin for thirty years, and they tapped his phone after the March on Washington for Jobs and Freedom. Before he died in 1987, Rustin had requested the FBI files; and his surviving partner Walter Naegle shared them with the filmmakers.

== Reviews ==
Robert Julian wrote in his review for the Bay Area Reporter that the pace of the film is slow, and he wanted to see more information on his private life and some insight into how he managed to support himself financially through his work as an activist. Sam Adams of the Philadelphia City Paper said that the connection between the public figure and the private man is barely probed in the film and complained that two of his lovers only got about three minutes of screen time. Adams also argued that the extent to which his homosexuality likely motivated his activism, far more than it hindered it, remains unexplored.

Film Threat said in their review that it was a fascinating film, but is a "bit too much of a love fest". However, they did compliment the film for educating audiences about how it was Rustin who organized the famous March on Washington, and then later in life was shunned by Malcolm X for being too "accommodating" and an "insider". Film critic Joe Leydon praised the film's directors for "underscoring Rustin's matter-of-fact courage and self-effacing pragmatism" and also said the pair of directors were "too honest to attempt a canonization of their subject". Leydon said the only flaw he noticed was the "hokey faux-noir" part of the film where an FBI agent was seen typing up reports while ominously describing "incriminating evidence" that the agency possessed against Rustin.

== Accolades ==
Festival / Organization	Award	Result	Ref.
American Library Association	Notable Video	Won	
Black Reel Awards	Outstanding Original Television Program	Nominated	
Chicago International Television Competition	Silver Hugo	Won	
CINE	Golden Eagle Award	Won	
Cinequest San Jose Film Festival	Best Documentary	Won	
GLAAD Media Awards	Outstanding Documentary	Won	
NAACP Image Awards	Outstanding News/Information – Series or Special	Nominated	
New York Lesbian, Gay, Bisexual, & Transgender Film Festival	Best Feature	Won	
Outfest Los Angeles	Outstanding Documentary Feature	Won	
Philadelphia International Gay & Lesbian Film Festival	Best Documentary	Won	
San Francisco International Lesbian & Gay Film Festival	Best Documentary	Won	
Sundance Film Festival	Best Documentary	Nominated	
Turin International Film Festival	Best Documentary	Won	
Vienna International Film Festival	Audience Favorite	Won	

== See also ==
- Civil rights movement in popular culture
- List of civil rights leaders
- Timeline of the civil rights movement
- "We Shall Overcome"
