= Regarding Susan Sontag =

- Directed by: Nancy Kates
- Music by: Laura Karpman
- Release date: April 19, 2014 (Tribeca Film Festival)

Regarding Susan Sontag is a 2014 documentary film about the American intellectual Susan Sontag, directed by Nancy Kates. It premiered at Tribeca Film Festival in April 2014 and on HBO in December 2014. Interviewees include Nobel laureate Nadine Gordimer, writers Terry Castle, Wayne Koestenbaum, Stephen Koch and Fran Lebowitz, and Sontag's sister Judith Sontag Cohen. Actress Patricia Clarkson voices Sontag's journals and writings.

== Reception ==
On review aggregator Rotten Tomatoes, the film holds an approval rating of 86% based on 7 reviews, with an average rating of 8.33/10. On Metacritic, the film has a weighted average score of 79 out of 100, based on 4 critics, indicating "generally favorable reviews". Stephen Holden of The New York Times called the film "compelling" and "perceptive".

The film received the Special Jury Mention for Best Documentary Feature at the 2014 Tribeca Film Festival.
