= Black Reel Award for Outstanding Original Television Program =

Annual US television award

This article lists the winners and nominees for the Black Reel Award for Outstanding Original Television Program. This category was first given in 2002, before being retired during the 2006 ceremony.

== Winners and nominees ==
Winners are listed first and highlighted in bold.

=== 2000s ===
| Year | Television Program | Ref |
|---|---|---|
2002
| 2002 | **Beyond Tara: The Extraordinary Life of Hattie McDaniel** | |
| 2002 | Marcus Garvey: Look for Me in the Whirlwind | |
| 2002 | 32nd NAACP Image Awards | |
| 2002 | VH1 Divas Live: The One and Only Aretha Franklin | |
2003
| 2003 | **Jim Brown: All-American** | |
2004
| 2004 | **Unchained Memories** | |
| 2004 | The American Experience: The Murder of Emmett Till (15.6) | |
| 2004 | Brother Outsider: The Life of Bayard Rustin | |
| 2004 | Hollywood Celebrates Denzel Washington: An American Cinematheque Tribute | |
2005
| 2005 | **America Beyond the Color Line with Henry Louis Gates Jr.** | |
| 2005 | Beyond Brown: Pursuing the Promise | |
| 2005 | The N-Word | |
