= Bayard Rustin Center for Social Justice =

Nonprofit organization in New Jersey

Coordinates: 40.348017°N 74.664456°W

- Formation: 2018; 8 years ago
- Type: Nonprofit
- Headquarters: Princeton, New Jersey
- Website: https://www.rustincenter.org/

The Bayard Rustin Center for Social Justice is a nonprofit organization located in Princeton, New Jersey. It hosts programming and events geared towards public health, gender and sexual advocacy, and civil rights for marginalized people, particularly LGBTQIA+ youth. The center was named in honor of Bayard Rustin, a Black and gay activist of the American civil rights movement and houses the first of its kind digital Queer History Archive dedicated to preserving his life and legacy. The center also organizes with partner organizations across the country various exhibits and programs to amplify the oft-erased intersectional Black Queer Civil & LGBTQIA+ Rights pioneer to the greater community such as their “Bayard Rustin at the Crossroads” exhibit curated at the Stonewall Museum that spotlights the importance of intersectionality intertwined with stories of the civil rights movement.

== History ==
The Bayard Rustin Center for Social Justice (BRCSJ) was founded in 2018 by Robt Martin Seda-Schreiber, a former middle-school teacher who founded the first middle school gay-straight alliance in New Jersey. In 2017, he was named Social Justice Activist of the Year by the National Education Association and in 2024, was honored as LGBT History Month Icon by the Equality Forum.

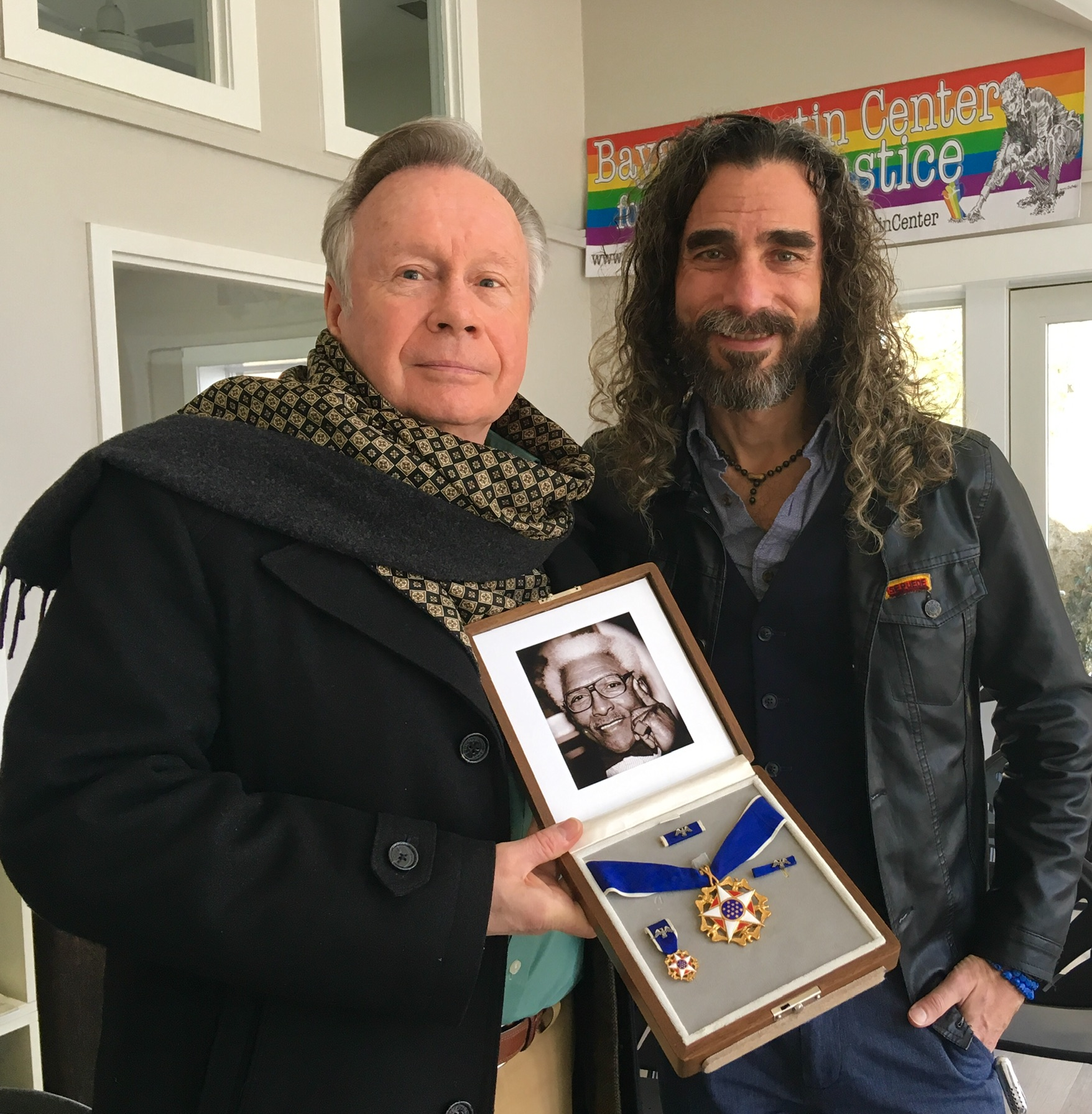
Chief Activist Robt Martin Seda-Schreiber and Board Member Emeritus Walter Naegle with Bayard Rustin's Medal of Freedom.

From 2018 to 2020, the BRCSJ operated from its first headquarters on Wiggins Street in Princeton, NJ. On June 30, 2018, the BRCSJ held the second largest "Families Belong Together" rally in NJ. In collaboration with Central Jersey GLSEN, the BRCSJ held New Jersey's largest LGBTQ youth forum, with keynote speaker Gavin Grimm. The BRCSJ supported New Jersey State Legislature Bill A1335 which “would require Boards of Education to include instruction, and adopt instructional materials, that accurately portray political, economic, and social contributions of persons with disabilities and lesbian, gay, bisexual, and transgender individuals.” In 2019, the organization co-sponsored Martin Luther King Jr. Day events at Princeton University. Also in 2019, the BRCSJ organized Princeton's first Pride parade as well as Princeton's first drag show.

In 2020, the BCRSJ transitioned to a completely virtual platform due to the COVID-19 pandemic. They hosted a Virtual Pride event, which featured such guests as Billy Porter, Sam Sparro, and Luis and Bob from Sesame Street. They began a nightly virtual Social Justice Power Hour, with guests including Robert Jones Jr., Patton Oswalt, Valerie Jarrett, Maggie Smith, Adam Gopnik, Wayne Brady, Garry Trudeau, Raquel Willis, Gavin Grimm, Rep. Malcolm Kenyatta, Ibram X. Kendi, PA Lt. Gov. and Senator-elect John Fetterman, John Doe (X), Billy Eichner, Keisha Blain, Kiese Laymon, and Susanna Hoffs. The Social Justice Power Hour ran continuously every weeknight for over 600 shows from 2020 to 2022 and continued in a multiplatform format. The BRCSJ collaborated with the Unitarian Universalist Church of Princeton's Racial Justice Task Force to declare racism a public health crisis. In 2020, the BRCSJ received a commendation in a Joint legislative Resolution from the New Jersey Senate and General Assembly. In 2022, Congresswoman Bonnie Watson Coleman presented the BRCSJ with a Congressional Proclamation, "recognizing and honoring Bayard Rustin Center for Social Justice’s (BRCSJ) positive impact and achievements as an activist center, educational bridge and safe space for LGBTQIA youth, families and allies".

In March 2022, it re-opened physically at the organization's second headquarters in Princeton, at 12 Stockton Street. In June 2022, the BRCSJ organized Princeton's Pride parade, which drew over 3500 people, and was headlined by Alan Muraoka of Sesame Street as Grand Marshall.

== Objectives and activities ==
The BRCSJ continues to offer programming and service as a local safe space for multigenerational, intersectional communities. Some of their services include free, in-house therapy for LGBTQIA youth; birth justice and reproductive rights offered by a BRCSJ Doula-in-Residence; the Transgender Justice Collective; Queer History Archive; and the Queer Youth Brigade. The BRCSJ is home to a social justice lending library which features over 1,000 books by authors who are LGBTQIA+ or hold other marginalized identities.

== People ==
Bayard Rustin's partner Walter Naegle is Board Member Emeritus. Members of the BRCSJ Board of Directors have included Emilio Delgado who played Luis on Sesame Street; Emmy and GLAAD Media Award winner Alan Muraoka (Alan on Sesame Street); Dr. Peniel E. Joseph; Glen Pannell (Mike Hot-Pence); Rasheed Newson, author of “My Government Means To Kill Me”; and Bel-Air EP, poet and podcaster Micelle Elizabeth Brown; Coalition for Peace Action founder Rev. Robert Moore; Philadelphia trans activist Erin Worrell; Pulitzer Prize winning journalist Tom Haydon; queer educator Carol Watchler; labor rights organizer David Sailer; Center for Medicare Advocacy lawyer Wey-Wey Kwok; Stark & Stark shareholder Thomas Onder; and Dean Dafis, first openly gay mayor of Maplewood, New Jersey.

Chief Activist Robt Martin Seda-Schreiber was named as a top straight ally in New Jersey by Insider NJ before coming out as bisexual then honored as LGBT History Month Icon by the Equality Forum as well as honorably mentioned as a Bee Hero by the Bisexual Resource Center in celebration of Bisexuality Awareness Week.
