= Bayard Rustin Sings a Program of Spirituals =

Studio album by Bayard Rustin
- Released: 1952
- Label: Fellowship Records

Bayard Rustin Sings Twelve Spirituals on The Life of Christ with readings from the Bible by James Farmer is a 10-inch LP released in 1952 by civil rights and peace activist Bayard Rustin on Fellowship Records, a label owned by the Fellowship of Reconciliation (FOR), for which Rustin was working as a youth organizer. The album consists of Rustin singing a cappella spirituals in the tenor register with scripture reading by James Farmer. The album was recorded shortly before Rustin left for Africa on a trip for the FOR. Rustin also recorded Elizabethan Songs and Negro Spirituals, with harpsichord accompaniment by Margaret Davison. It was also released by Fellowship Records. Both of these recordings were combined on a compact disc, Bayard Rustin: The Singer.

Rustin recorded a live concert in 1972, which was released on compact disc as Bayard Rustin Sings Spirituals, Work, and Freedom Songs. He was accompanied on piano by Jonathan Brice.

Bayard Rustin: The Singer and Bayard Rustin Sings Spirituals, Work, and Freedom Songs are available on compact disc.

Rustin had previously sung for a musical stage play John Henry, starring Paul Robeson, and in a blues group, Josh White and the Carolinians, but it was primarily through his political and social activities that he would achieve wider renown.

== Song list ==
- "Go Tell It on the Mountain"
- "Mary, What You Goin' to Name That Baby?"
- "Wasn't That a Mighty Day?"
- "I Know The Lord's Laid His Hands on Me"
- "Shepherd, Where'd You Lose Your Sheep?"
- "Sometimes I Feel Like a Motherless Child"
- "Jesus Walked His Lonesome Valley"
- "Were You There When They Crucified My Lord?"
- "He Never Said a Mumblin' Word"
- "Lord, I Don't Care Where You Bury My Body"
- "He Arose"
- "He Is King of Kings"
