= Walter Naegle =

American artist and photographer

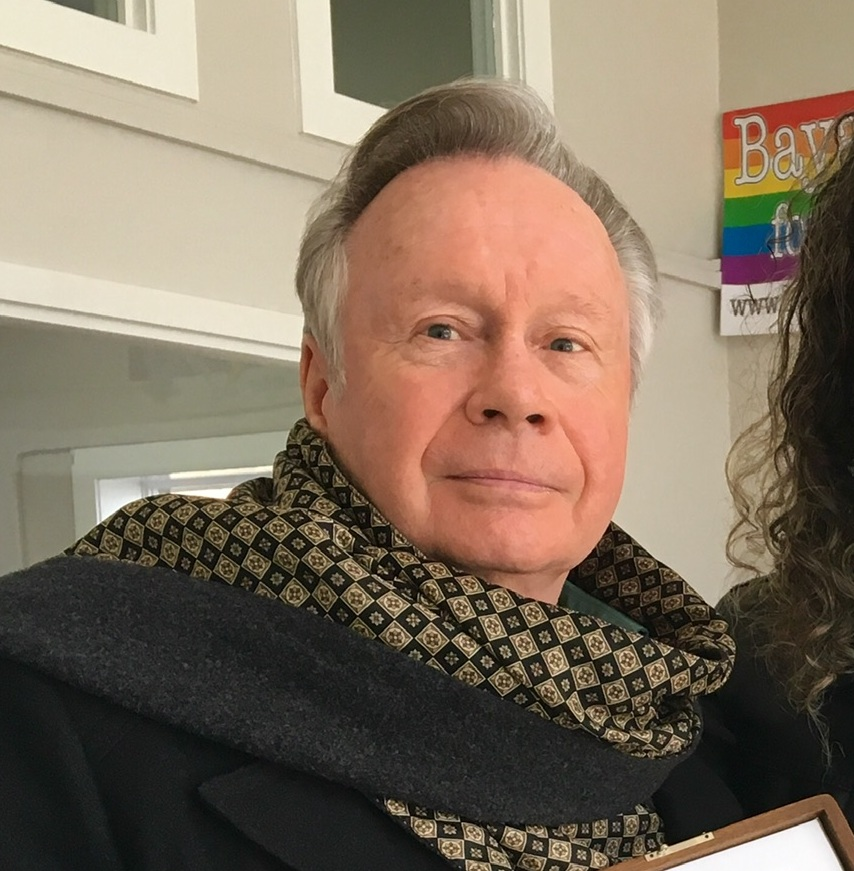
- Walter Naegle at BRCSJ headquarters
- Born: 1949 (age 76–77); Morristown, New Jersey, U.S.
- Education: University of Bridgeport; Fordham University (BFA)
- Partner: Bayard Rustin (1977–1987)
- Website: https://www.rustincenter.org

Walter Naegle (born 1949) is an American artist and photographer who is the surviving partner of late American Civil Rights leader Bayard Rustin, and the executive director of the Bayard Rustin Fund, which commemorates Rustin's life, values, and legacy. Naegle serves as board member emeritus at the Bayard Rustin Center for Social Justice, an LGBT "safe space," community activist center, and educational enclave in Princeton, New Jersey dedicated to honoring Bayard Rustin through their mission and good works.

== Early life ==
Born in Morristown, New Jersey, Naegle was raised in Succasunna, New Jersey, in a Roman Catholic home with six siblings. During high school in the 1960s, he became interested in the African-American struggle for civil rights and social justice, particularly with its commitment to nonviolence as the means to bring about democratic change.

== Education and early career ==
After attending the University of Bridgeport for one year, he left to join VISTA (Volunteers In Service To America), and worked for a year in the Hilliard Houses Senior Center (Chicago) an agency of Hull House Association. As his interest in nonviolence and pacifism grew, he decided to confront the Selective Service System, writing a letter to his draft board in January 1969 stating that he could not cooperate with the Selective Service and would refuse induction were he called. The Vietnam War was at its height at that time, just as Naegle was graduating high school. Immediately summoned to report for induction, he did not appear, but was never indicted because the local draft board had acted improperly in his case.

He moved to New York City in January 1970 and found a studio apartment in Spanish Harlem. He worked as a psychiatric technician at the New York State Psychiatric Institute until September 1972, both in the children's ward and on a unit researching bipolar disorder. During this time he also attended night school at the Germain School of Photography in Lower Manhattan and began taking photographs with medium format cameras (Rolleiflex, Bronica and Yashica).

== Relationship with Bayard Rustin ==
Naegle first met Bayard Rustin in April 1977:

The day that I met Bayard I was actually on my way to Times Square. We were on the same corner waiting for the light to change. He had a wonderful shock of white hair. I guess he was of my parents' generation, but we looked at each other and lightning struck.

After a few months, the two became steady partners. Naegle returned to school in the fall of 1977, studying at Fordham University, where he was hired to work in the Development Office and in the Graduate School of Education. He was graduated summa cum laude in 1981 with a bachelor's degree in Studio Art. He moved in with Rustin who resided in the Mutual Redevelopment Houses (Penn South). In 2016 Rustin's residence was listed in the National Register of Historic Places. Because same-sex marriage was illegal at the time, Rustin legally adopted Naegle in 1982 (an instance of same-sex adult adoption). The two were together for a decade until Rustin's death in 1987. Rustin's obituary in The New York Times does not mention the partnership, describing Naegle as his "administrative assistant and adopted son". On November 20, 2013, Naegle accepted the Medal of Freedom from President Barack Obama in honor of Rustin's work of 1963 March on Washington for Jobs and Freedom. He and Sally Ride's partner, Tam O'Shaughnessy, were the first LGBTQ partners to accept the award for their late partners. Upon accepting the medal, he described Rustin as such:

Being black, being homosexual, being a political radical, that's a combination that's pretty volatile and it comes along like Halley's Comet. Bayard's life was complex, but at the same time, I think it makes it a lot more interesting.

== Selected works ==
- Troublemaker for Justice: The Story of Bayard Rustin, the Man Behind the March on Washington, (City Lights, 2019) ISBN 9780872867659 — co-author of this young adult biography

== See also ==
- Brother Outsider: The Life of Bayard Rustin, 2003 documentary film
- Bayard & Me, 16-minute short film by Matt Wolf, from Neagle's perspective
