= Bayard Rustin =

American civil rights activist (1912–1987)

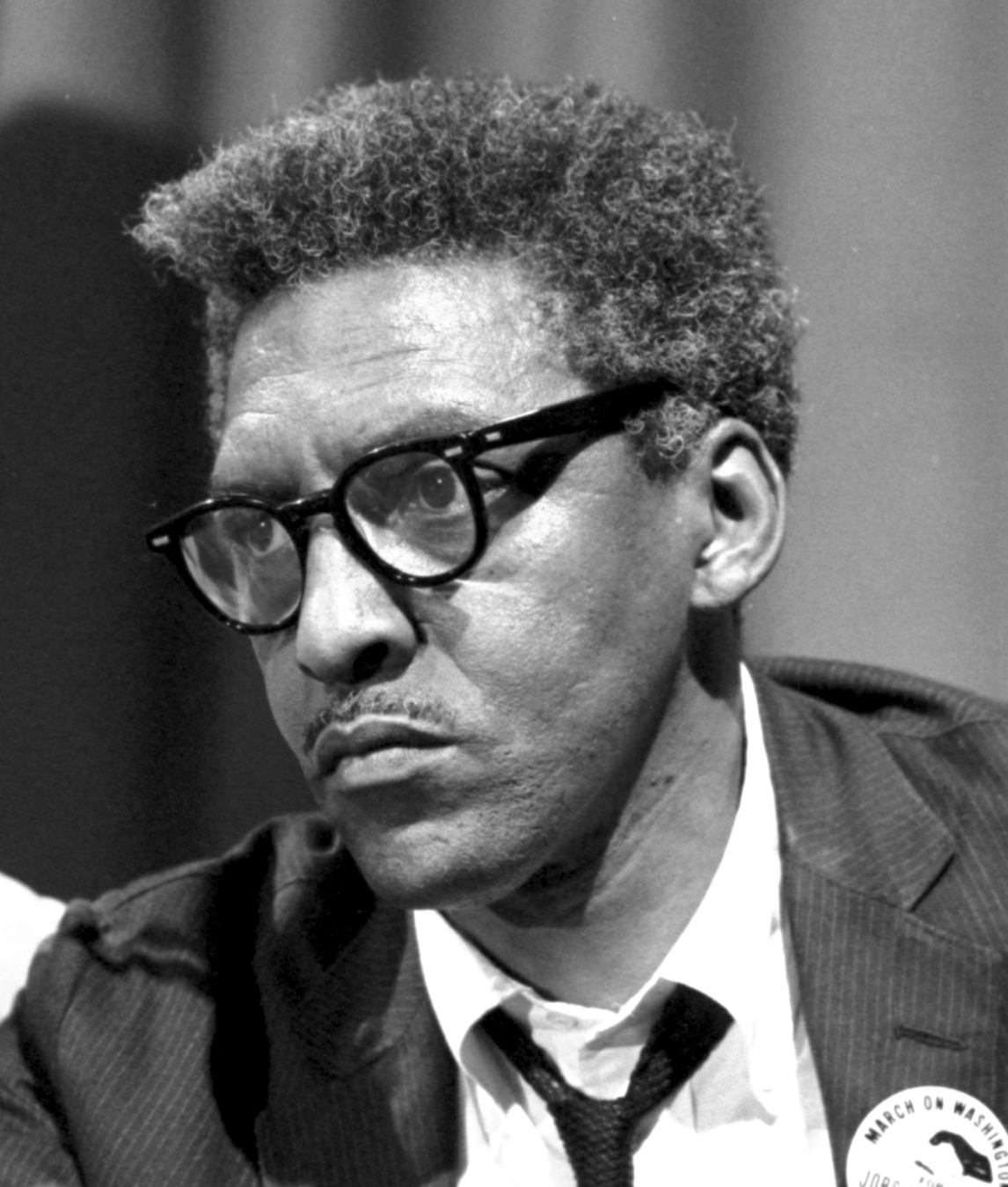
- Rustin at a news briefing on the March on Washington in Washington, D.C., on August 27, 1963
- Born: March 17, 1912; West Chester, Pennsylvania, U.S.
- Died: August 24, 1987 (aged 75); New York City, U.S.
- Education: Wilberforce University; Cheyney University; City College of New York
- Organization(s): Fellowship of Reconciliation; Congress of Racial Equality; War Resisters League; Southern Christian Leadership Conference; Social Democrats, USA (National Chairman); A. Philip Randolph Institute (President); Committee on the Present Danger; Omega Psi Phi
- Movement: Civil Rights Movement, Peace Movement, Socialism, Gay Rights Movement, Neoconservatism
- Partner(s): Davis Platt (1940s); Walter Naegle (1977–1987; Rustin's death)
- Awards: Presidential Medal of Freedom

Bayard Rustin (/ˈbaɪ.ərd/ BY-ərd; March 17, 1912 – August 24, 1987) was an American political activist and prominent leader in social movements for civil rights, socialism, nonviolence, and gay rights. Rustin was the principal organizer of the March on Washington for Jobs and Freedom in 1963.

In 1941, Rustin worked with A. Philip Randolph on the March on Washington Movement to press for an end to racial discrimination in the military and defense industry. Rustin later organized Freedom Rides and helped organize the Southern Christian Leadership Conference to mentor Martin Luther King Jr. on nonviolent resistance. In 1954, Rustin worked alongside Ella Baker, a co-director of the Crusade for Citizenship. Before the Montgomery bus boycott, he helped organize a group called "In Friendship" to provide material and legal assistance to people threatened with eviction from their tenant farms and homes. Rustin became the head of the AFL–CIO's A. Philip Randolph Institute, which promoted the integration of formerly all-white unions and the unionization of African Americans. During the 1970s and 1980s, Rustin served on many humanitarian missions, such as aiding refugees from Vietnam and Cambodia.

Rustin was a gay man and, due to criticism of his sexuality, usually advised other civil rights leaders from behind the scenes. During the 1980s, he became a public advocate on behalf of gay causes, speaking at events as an activist and supporter of human rights.

Later in life, Rustin shifted toward neoconservative views. As leader of Social Democrats USA, he opposed racial quotas and Black studies programs. He occasionally wrote for Commentary magazine, aligning closely with its publisher, Norman Podhoretz. Upon Rustin's death, President Ronald Reagan paid tribute to his work.

On November 20, 2013, Rustin was posthumously awarded the Presidential Medal of Freedom by President Barack Obama.

In 2018, the nonprofit Bayard Rustin Center for Social Justice was created in Rustin's honor in collaboration with his surviving partner Walter Naegle, who serves as BRCSJ Board Member Emeritus. Located in Princeton, New Jersey, the organization hosts programming and events geared toward public health, gender and sexual advocacy, and civil rights for marginalized people, particularly LGBTQIA+ youth, and houses the Queer History Archive, dedicated to preserving Rustin's life and legacy.

== Early life and education ==
Rustin was born in 1912 in West Chester, Pennsylvania, to Florence Rustin and Archie Hopkins, who were unmarried. As Florence was a single mother, Rustin was raised by his maternal grandparents, Julia (Davis) and Janifer Rustin, wealthy local caterers, as the ninth of their 12 children; growing up he believed his biological mother was his older sister. Though she attended her husband's African Methodist Episcopal Church, Julia Rustin was a Quaker. She was also a member of the National Association for the Advancement of Colored People (NAACP). NAACP leaders such as W. E. B. Du Bois and James Weldon Johnson were frequent guests in the Rustin home. With these influences in his early life, in his youth Rustin campaigned against Jim Crow laws.

One of the first documented realizations Rustin had of his sexuality was when he mentioned to his grandmother that he preferred to spend time with boys rather than girls. She responded, "I suppose that's what you need to do".

In 1932, Rustin entered Wilberforce University, a historically Black college in Ohio operated by the AME Church. He was active in a number of campus organizations, including the Omega Psi Phi fraternity. He was expelled from Wilberforce in 1936 after organizing a strike, and later attended Cheyney State Teachers College (now Cheyney University of Pennsylvania). In 2013, Cheyney awarded Rustin a posthumous Doctor of Humane Letters degree.

After completing an activist training program conducted by the American Friends Service Committee (AFSC), Rustin moved to Harlem in 1937 and began studying at City College of New York. There he became involved in efforts to defend and free the Scottsboro Boys, nine young Black Alabama men accused of raping two white women. He was part of the Young Communist League from 1936 to 1941, leaving after the Communist Party USA rescinded its antiwar policy in response to Nazi Germany's invasion of the USSR. This conflicted with Rustin's antiwar stance. Soon after arriving in New York City, he became a member of Fifteenth Street Meeting of the Religious Society of Friends (Quakers).

Rustin was an accomplished tenor vocalist, an asset that earned him admission to both Wilberforce University and Cheyney State Teachers College with music scholarships. In 1939, he was in the chorus of short-lived Broadway musical John Henry. Fellow cast member and blues singer Josh White later invited Rustin to join his gospel and vocal harmony group Josh White and the Carolinians, with which he made several recordings. With this opportunity, Rustin became a regular performer at the Café Society nightclub in Greenwich Village. A few albums on Fellowship Records featuring his singing, such as Bayard Rustin Sings a Program of Spirituals, were produced from the 1950s through the 1970s.

== World War II ==
During the 1930s, at the direction of the Soviet Union, the Communist Party USA (CPUSA) and its members, including Rustin, were active in the early civil rights movement. Following Joseph Stalin's "theory of nationalism", they favored creating a separate nation for African Americans in the Southeastern United States. But in 1941, after Nazi Germany's invasion of the Soviet Union, the Communist International ordered the CPUSA to abandon its civil rights work and focus instead on supporting U.S. entry into World War II.

Disillusioned, Rustin began working instead with members of Norman Thomas's Socialist Party of America, particularly A. Philip Randolph and pacifist A. J. Muste, leader of the Fellowship of Reconciliation (FOR), who hired Rustin as a race relations secretary in the summer of 1941, considering him a man of oratorical ability and intelligence who would sacrifice himself repeatedly for a good cause.

Muste, Randolph, and Rustin proposed a march on Washington, D.C., in 1941 to protest racial segregation in the armed forces and widespread employment discrimination. In an Oval Office meeting with President Franklin D. Roosevelt, Randolph told Roosevelt that African Americans would march in the capital unless desegregation occurred. To prove their good faith, the organizers canceled the planned march after Roosevelt issued Executive Order 8802 (the Fair Employment Act), which banned discrimination in defense industries and federal agencies.

According to Daniel Levinson, Rustin had an "infinite capacity for compassion". In 1944, while imprisoned in North Carolina, Rustin displayed nonviolent tactics, allowing himself to get beaten repeatedly by a white inmate until he gave up. Rustin defied segregation during that time and practiced his tactic while incarcerated.

Randolph's decision as leader of the organizers to cancel the march was made against Rustin's advice. The armed forces, in which Black troops typically had white commanding officers, remained racially segregated until 1948, when President Harry S. Truman desegregated them by executive order.

Randolph felt that FOR had achieved its goal and wanted to dissolve the committee. Again, Rustin disagreed, and voiced his opinion in a national press conference, which he later said he regretted.

Rustin traveled to California to help protect the property of the more than 120,000 Japanese-Americans (most of them U.S.-born citizens) imprisoned in internment camps. In Korematsu v. United States, the Supreme Court upheld the forcible internment. Impressed by Rustin's organizational skills, Muste appointed him as FOR's secretary for student and general affairs.

Rustin was also a pioneer in the movement to desegregate interstate bus travel. In 1942, he boarded a bus in Louisville, bound for Nashville, and sat in the second row. A number of drivers asked him to move to the back, according to Southern practice, but Rustin refused. The bus was stopped by police 13 miles north of Nashville and Rustin was arrested. He was beaten and taken to a police station, but released uncharged.

In an interview with the Washington Blade in the 1980s, Rustin spoke about his decision to be arrested and how that moment also clarified his witness as a gay man:

As I was going by the second seat to go to the rear, a white child reached out for the ring necktie I was wearing and pulled it, whereupon its mother said, "Don't touch a nigger."

If I go and sit quietly at the back of that bus now, that child, who was so innocent of race relations that it was going to play with me, will have seen so many blacks go in the back and sit down quietly that it's going to end up saying, "They like it back there, I've never seen anybody protest against it." I owe it to that child, not only to my own dignity, I owe it to that child, that it should be educated to know that blacks do not want to sit in the back, and therefore I should get arrested, letting all these white people in the bus know that I do not accept that.

It occurred to me shortly after that that it was an absolute necessity for me to declare homosexuality because if I didn't I was a part of the prejudice. I was aiding and abetting the prejudice that was a part of the effort to destroy me.

In 1942, Rustin helped FOR staffers George Houser and James Farmer and activist Bernice Fisher form the Congress of Racial Equality (CORE), which was conceived as a pacifist organization based on the writings of Mohandas Gandhi, who used nonviolent resistance against British rule in India.

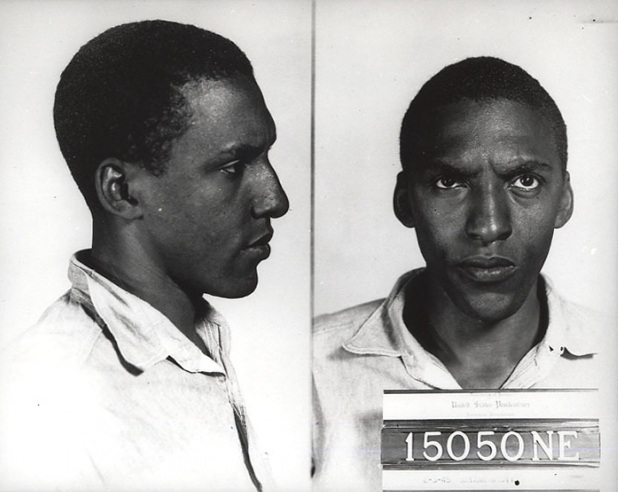
Rustin's Bureau of Prisons mugshot c. 1944

As conscientious objectors who refused induction into the military, Rustin, Houser, and other members of FOR and CORE were convicted of violating the Selective Service Act. From 1944 to 1946, Rustin was imprisoned in Ashland Federal Prison in Kentucky and Lewisburg Federal Penitentiary in Pennsylvania. At both, he organized protests against racially segregated housing and dining facilities. During his incarceration, he also organized FOR's Free India Committee. After his release from prison, he was frequently arrested for protesting against British colonial rule in both India and Africa.

Just before a trip to Africa while college secretary of the FOR, Rustin recorded a 10-inch LP, Elizabethan Songs and Negro Spirituals, for the Fellowship Records label. He sang spirituals and Elizabethan songs, accompanied on the harpsichord by Margaret Davison.

== Influence on the civil rights movement ==
In 1947, Rustin and Houser organized the Journey of Reconciliation. This was the first of the Freedom Rides to test the 1946 Supreme Court ruling Morgan v. Commonwealth of Virginia, which banned racial discrimination in interstate travel. Rustin and Houser recruited seven white men and seven Black men to ride in pairs through Virginia, North Carolina, Tennessee, and Kentucky. The NAACP opposed CORE's Gandhian tactics as too meek. Participants in the Journey of Reconciliation were arrested several times. Arrested with Igal Roodenko and Joe Felmet, Rustin served 22 days on a chain gang in North Carolina for violating state Jim Crow laws segregating public transportation. On June 17, 2022, Chapel Hill Superior Court Judge Allen Baddour, with full consent of the state, dismissed the 1947 North Carolina charges against the four Freedom Riders.

In 1948, Rustin traveled to India to learn techniques of nonviolent civil resistance directly from the leaders of the Gandhian movement. The conference had been organized before Gandhi's assassination earlier that year. Between 1947 and 1952, Rustin also met with leaders of independence movements in Ghana and Nigeria. In 1951, he formed the Committee to Support South African Resistance, which later became the American Committee on Africa.

In January 1953, Rustin was arrested in Pasadena, California, for sexual activity in a parked car with two other men. Originally charged with vagrancy and lewd conduct, he pleaded guilty to a single, lesser charge of "sex perversion" (as sodomy was officially called in California at the time, even if consensual) and served 60 days in jail. The Pasadena arrest was the first time Rustin's homosexuality came to public attention. He had been and remained candid in private about his sexuality, although homosexual activity was still criminalized throughout the United States. Rustin resigned from the Fellowship of Reconciliation (FOR) because of his convictions. They also greatly affected Rustin's relationship with Muste, who had already tried to change Rustin's sexuality earlier in their relationship. Their relationship continued, but more tensely. Rustin became the executive secretary of the War Resisters League. An American Legion chapter in Montana used Rustin's Pasadena conviction to try to cancel his lectures in the state.

Rustin served as an unidentified member of the American Friends Service Committee's task force to write "Speak Truth to Power: A Quaker Search for an Alternative to Violence" (1955), one of the most influential and widely discussed pacifist essays in the U.S. Rustin had wanted to keep his participation quiet, as he believed critics would use his sexual orientation as an excuse to compromise the 71-page pamphlet when it was published. It analyzed the Cold War and the American response to it and recommended nonviolent solutions.

Rustin took leave from the War Resisters League in 1956 to advise minister Martin Luther King Jr. of the Baptist Church on Gandhian tactics. King was organizing the Montgomery bus boycott. According to Rustin, "I think it's fair to say that Dr. King's view of nonviolent tactics was almost nonexistent when the boycott began. In other words, Dr. King was permitting himself and his children and his home to be protected by guns." Rustin convinced King to abandon the armed protection, including a personal handgun. In a 1964 interview with Robert Penn Warren for the book Who Speaks for the Negro?, Rustin said his integrative ideology began to differ from King's. He believed a social movement "has to be based on the collective needs of people at this time, regardless of color, creed, race".

In 1957, Rustin and King began organizing the Southern Christian Leadership Conference (SCLC). Many African-American leaders were concerned that Rustin's sexual orientation and past Communist affiliation would undermine support for the civil rights movement. After organizing the SCLC, Rustin and King planned a civil rights march adjacent to the 1960 Democratic National Convention in Los Angeles. This did not sit well with U.S. Representative Adam Clayton Powell Jr., who threatened to leak to the press a false rumor of an affair between Rustin and King. King canceled the march, and Rustin left his position in the SCLC. Harper's Magazine criticized King for this, writing that he lost "much moral credit ... in the eyes of the young." Rustin was open about his sexual orientation and his convictions were a matter of public record, but the events had not been widely discussed beyond the civil rights leadership. This setback did not change Rustin's direction in the movement.

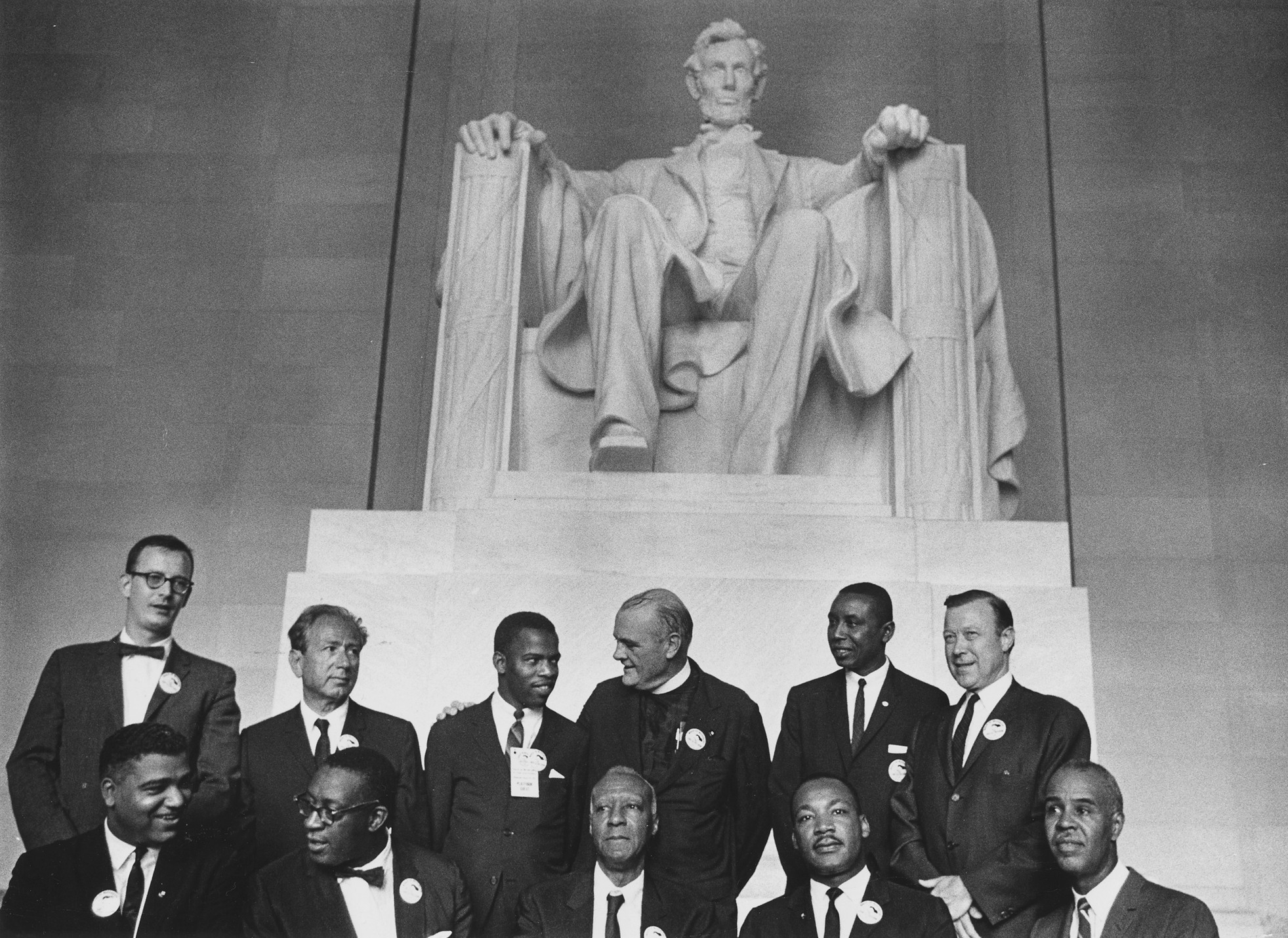
Leaders of the March on Washington posing in front of the statue of Abraham Lincoln on August 28, 1963

Rustin's gay identity was not a problem for King, who remained in contact with him after the event. They collaborated again to organize the March on Washington for Jobs and Freedom in 1963.

=== March on Washington ===
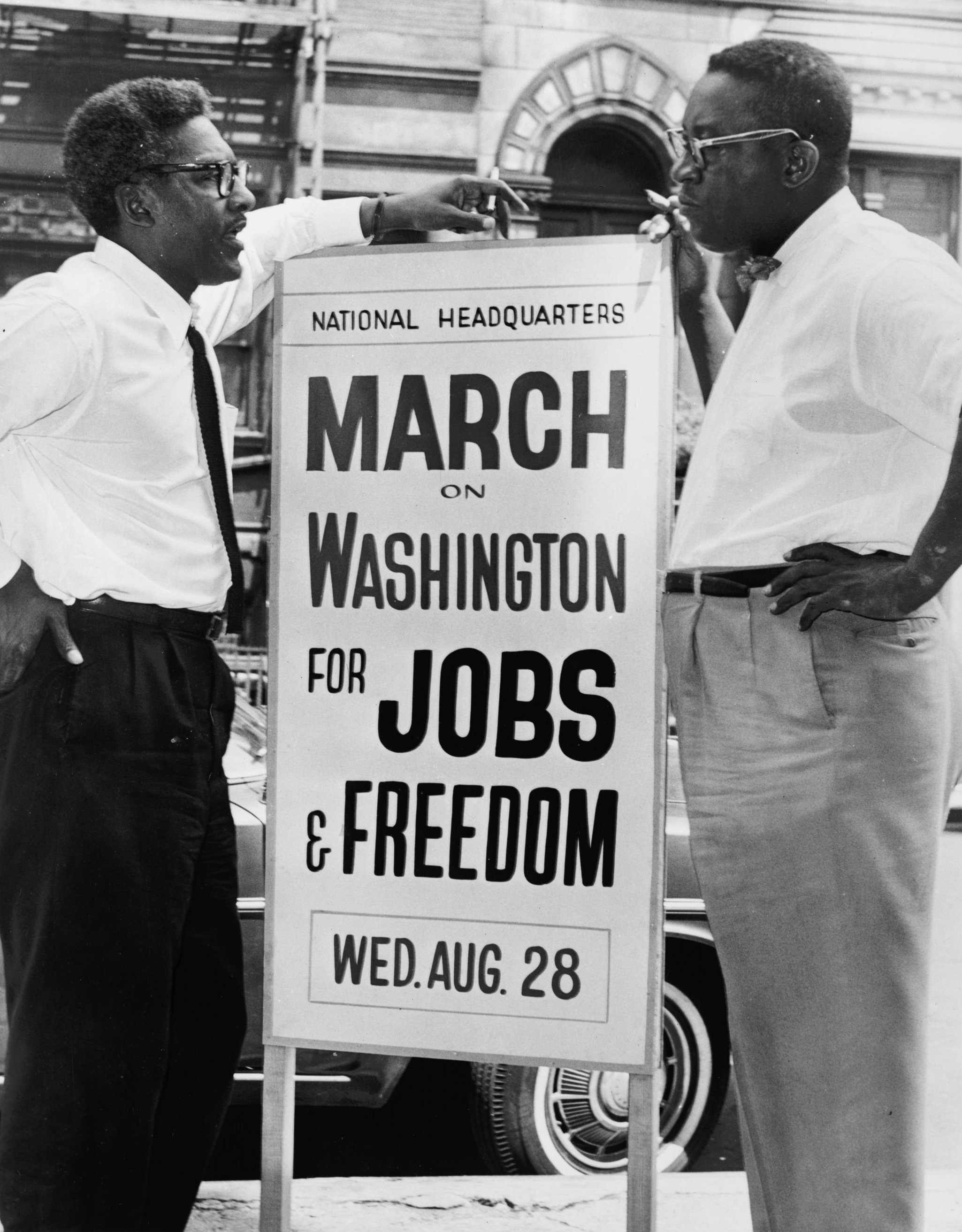
Rustin and Cleveland Robinson of the March on Washington for Jobs and Freedom on August 7, 1963

Despite shunning from some civil rights leaders,

[w]hen the moment came for an unprecedented mass gathering in Washington, Randolph pushed Rustin forward as the logical choice to organize it.

A few weeks before the March on Washington for Jobs and Freedom in August 1963, South Carolina Senator Strom Thurmond called Rustin a "Communist, draft-dodger, and homosexual" and had his entire Pasadena arrest file entered into the Congressional Record. Thurmond also produced a Federal Bureau of Investigation photograph of Rustin talking to King while King was bathing to imply that the two had a sexual relationship, which both denied.

External videos
- "Eyes on the Prize; America, They Loved You Madly; Interview with Bayard Rustin" conducted in 1979 for the America, They Loved You Madly, a precursor to the Eyes on the Prize documentary in which he discusses the Brown decision, the reasons for increased civil rights activism after World War II, and his work to organize the March on Washington for Jobs and Freedom.

Rustin became involved in the March on Washington in 1962 when A. Philip Randolph recruited him. The march was planned to be a commemoration of the Emancipation Proclamation 100 years earlier. Rustin was instrumental in organizing the march. Aided by Eleanor Holmes Norton and Rachelle Horowitz, he drilled off-duty police officers as marshals, bus captains to direct traffic, and scheduled the speakers. Despite King's support, NAACP chairman Roy Wilkins did not want Rustin to receive any public credit for his role in planning the march. Wilkins said, "This march is of such importance that we must not put a person of his liabilities at the head." Because of this conflict, Randolph served as the director of the march and Rustin as his deputy. While planning the march, Rustin feared his previous legal issues would threaten it. Nevertheless, on September 6, 1963, a photograph of Rustin and Randolph appeared on the cover of Life magazine, identifying them as "the leaders" of the March. Rustin gave his thoughts on the March, saying it "made Americans feel for the first time that we were capable of being truly a nation, that we were capable of moving beyond division and bigotry".

=== New York City school boycott ===
In early 1964, Reverend Milton Galamison and other Harlem community leaders invited Rustin to coordinate a citywide boycott of public schools to protest their de facto segregation. Before the boycott, the organizers asked the United Federation of Teachers Executive Board to join it or ask teachers to join the picket lines. The union declined, promising only to protect teachers who participated from reprisal. More than 400,000 New Yorkers participated in a February 3 boycott demanding complete integration of the city's schools. Historian Daniel Perlstein wrote, "newspapers were astounded both by the numbers of black and Puerto Rican parents and children who boycotted and by the complete absence of violence or disorder from the protesters." It was, Rustin said, and newspapers reported, "the largest civil rights demonstration" in U.S. history. Rustin said "the movement to integrate the schools will create far-reaching benefits" for teachers and students.

Rustin organized a May rally to call for "maximum possible" integration. Perlstein wrote: "The UFT and other white moderates endorsed the May rally, yet only four thousand protesters showed up, and the Board of Education was no more responsive to the conciliatory May demonstration than to the earlier, more confrontational boycott."

When Rustin was invited to speak at the University of Virginia in 1964, school administrators tried to ban him out of fear that he would organize a school boycott there.

== After 1964 ==
=== From protest to politics ===
In the spring of 1964, King was considering hiring Rustin as executive director of SCLC but Stanley Levison, a longtime activist friend of Rustin's, advised King against it because of what he considered Rustin's growing devotion to the political theorist Max Shachtman. Other SCLC leaders opposed Rustin due to his sexuality.

At the 1964 Democratic National Convention, which followed Freedom Summer in Mississippi, Rustin became an adviser to the Mississippi Freedom Democratic Party (MFDP), which was trying to gain recognition as the legitimate, non–Jim Crow delegation from its state, where Black people had been officially disenfranchised since the turn of the century (as they were generally throughout the South) and excluded from the official political system. DNC leaders Lyndon B. Johnson and Hubert Humphrey offered only two non-voting seats to the MFDP, with the official seating going to the regular segregationist Mississippi delegation. Rustin and the AFL–CIO leaders urged the MFDP to take the offer. MFDP leaders, including Fannie Lou Hamer and Bob Moses, angrily rejected the arrangement; many of their supporters became highly suspicious of Rustin. Rustin's attempt to compromise appealed to the Democratic Party leadership.

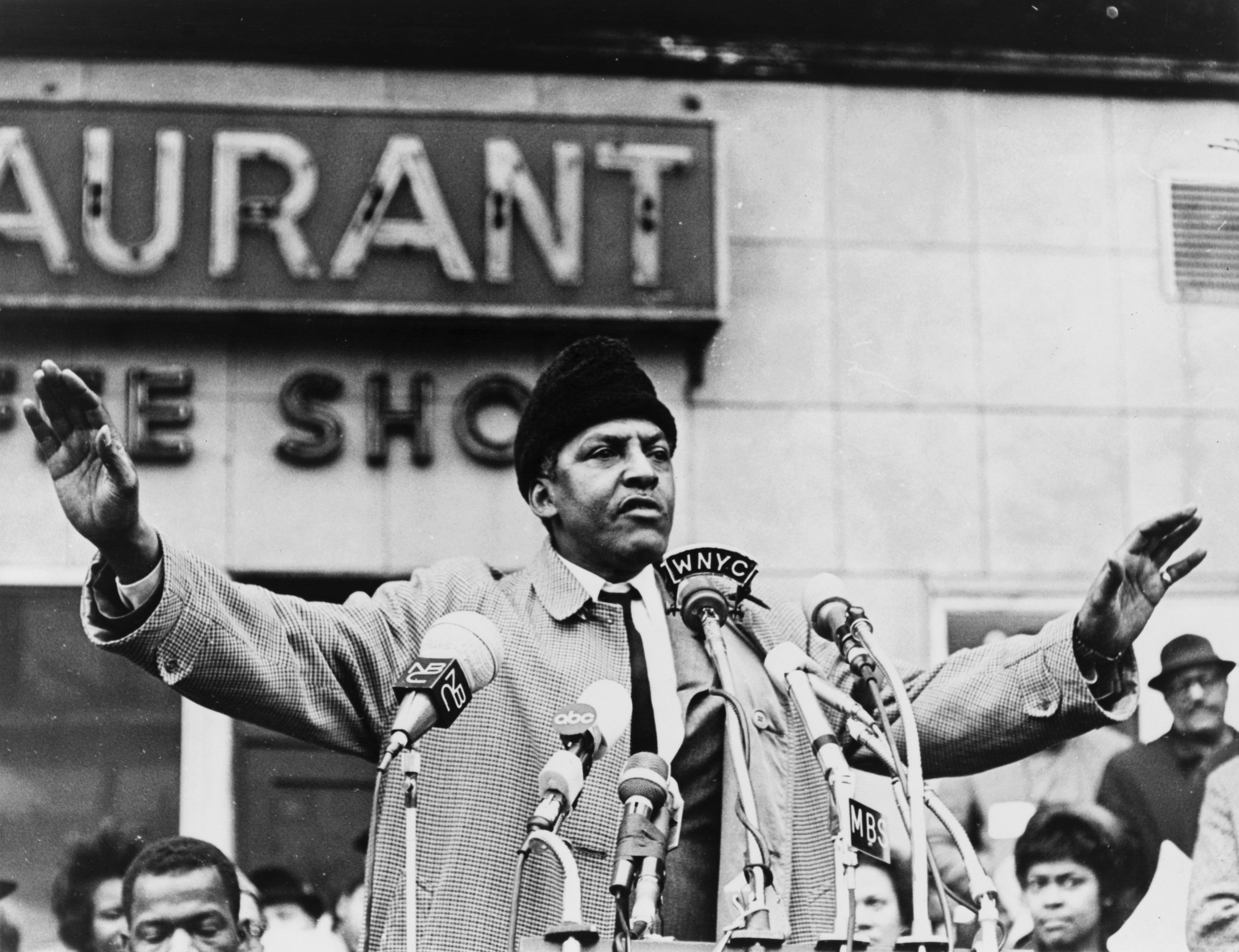
Rustin, 1963

After the passage of the Civil Rights Act of 1964, Rustin advocated closer ties between the civil rights movement and the Democratic Party, specifically the party's base among the white working class, many of whom still had strong union affiliations. In 1964, Rustin and Tom Kahn wrote the influential article "From Protest to Politics", published in Commentary magazine; it analyzed the changing economy and its implications for African Americans. Rustin wrote presciently that the rise of automation would reduce the demand for low-skill high-paying jobs, which would jeopardize the position of the urban African-American working class, particularly in northern states. He believed the working class must collaborate across racial lines for common economic goals. Since then, many urban African Americans have been dislocated and lost jobs due to the restructuring of industry. Rustin believed the African-American community must change its political strategy, building and strengthening a political alliance with predominantly white unions and other organizations (such as churches and synagogues) to pursue a common economic agenda. He wrote that it was time to move from protest to politics. His analysis was widely influential.

Rustin argued that since Black people could now legally patronize any public restaurant, they needed to be able to afford service financially. He believed a coalition of progressive forces to move the Democratic Party forward was needed to change the economic structure.

Rustin "repudiat[ed] the sloganeering of Black Power" and was especially contemptuous of cultural Black nationalism. He argued that the African-American community was threatened by the appeal of identity politics, thinking this position was a fantasy of middle-class Black people that repeated the political and moral errors of previous Black nationalists while alienating the white allies the African-American community needed. Although he continued to support the teaching of Black history, he (along with A. Philip Randolph and Roy Wilkins) became critical of "feel good" cultural nationalist versions of Black studies.

Nation editor and Harvard Law Professor Randall Kennedy stated that starting from the late 1960s, Rustin criticised radical leaders such as Stokely Carmichael, H. Rap Brown and Huey Newton, and took the side of the mostly white and Jewish United Federation of Teachers in its racially polarising 1968 New York City teachers' strike. Rustin also continued "to promote integration and nonviolent coalition politics." Kennedy adds that while Rustin had a general "disdain of nationalism", he had a "very different attitude toward Jewish nationalism" and was "unflaggingly supportive of Zionism".

=== Labor movement: Unions and social democracy ===
Rustin increasingly worked to strengthen the labor movement, which he saw as the champion of empowerment for the African American community and for economic justice for all Americans. He contributed to the labor movement's two sides, economic and political, by supporting labor unions and social-democratic politics. He founded and became the director of the A. Philip Randolph Institute, which coordinated the AFL-CIO's work on civil rights and economic justice. He became a regular columnist for the AFL-CIO newspaper. During the 1960s, Rustin was a member of the League for Industrial Democracy. He maintained his membership for decades, and became vice president during the 1980s.

On the political side of the labor movement, Rustin increased his visibility as a leader of the American movement for social democracy. In early 1972, he became a national co-chairman of the Socialist Party of America. In December 1972, when the Socialist Party changed its name to Social Democrats, USA (SDUSA), Rustin continued to serve as national co-chair with Charles S. Zimmerman. In his opening speech to the December 1972 SDUSA Convention, Rustin called for the party to organize against the "reactionary policies of the Nixon Administration" and criticized the "irresponsibility and élitism of the 'New Politics' liberals". In later years, Rustin served as the national chairman of SDUSA.

=== Foreign policy ===
Like many liberals and some socialists, Rustin supported President Lyndon B. Johnson's containment policy against communism, though he criticized the way it was carried out. In particular, to maintain independent labor unions and political opposition in Vietnam, Rustin and others gave critical support to U.S. military intervention in the Vietnam War, while calling for a negotiated peace treaty and democratic elections. But Rustin criticized the conduct of the war, arguing in a fundraising letter sent to War Resisters League supporters in 1964 that he was "angered and humiliated by the kind of war being waged, a war of torture, a war in which civilians are being machine-gunned from the air, and in which American napalm bombs are being dropped on the villages."

In 1970, Rustin called for the U.S. to send military jets to aid Israel against Arab states in the War of Attrition; referring to a New York Times article he wrote, Rustin wrote to Prime Minister Golda Meir, "I hope that the ad will also have an effect on a serious domestic question: namely, the relations between the Jewish and the Negro communities in America." Rustin was concerned about unity between two groups that he argued faced discrimination in the U.S. and abroad, and also believed that Israel's democratic ideals were proof that justice and equality would prevail in the Arab territories despite the atrocities of war. His former colleagues in the peace movement considered this a betrayal of Rustin's nonviolent ideals.

Throughout the 1970s and 1980s, Rustin worked as a human rights and election monitor for Freedom House.

In 1976, Rustin joined the anti-communist Committee on the Present Danger (CPD), which promoted Team B's controversial intelligence claims about Soviet foreign policy, using them as an argument against arms control agreements such as SALT II. The same year, Rustin was a member of the executive committee of the Writers and Artists for Peace in the Middle East, a pro-Israel group.

Rustin maintained his strongly anti-Soviet and anti-communist views, especially with regard to Africa. In 1977, he and Carl Gershman (a former SDUSA director and future Ronald Reagan appointee) co-wrote the essay "Africa, Soviet Imperialism & the Retreat of American Power", in which they decried Russian and Cuban involvement in the Angolan Civil War and defended the military intervention by apartheid South Africa on behalf of the National Liberation Front of Angola (FNLA) and National Union for the Total Independence of Angola (UNITA), writing, "if a South African force did intervene at the urging of black leaders and on the side of the forces that clearly represent the black majority in Angola, to counter a non-African army of Cubans ten times its size, by what standard of political judgment is this immoral?" Rustin accused the USSR of a classic imperialist agenda in Africa in pursuit of economic resources and vital sea lanes, and called the Carter administration "hypocritical" for claiming to be committed to the welfare of Black people while doing too little to thwart Russian and Cuban expansion in Africa.

In 1979, as co-chair of the Coalition for a Democratic Majority, he travelled to Rhodesia with a Freedom House delegation to observe its election, the first after the end of white rule, reporting positively on it.

=== Soviet Jewry movement ===
The plight of Jews in the Soviet Union reminded Rustin of the struggles of African Americans. Soviet Jews faced many of the same forms of discrimination in employment, education, and housing, while also being prohibited from emigrating. After seeing the injustice Soviet Jews faced, Rustin became a leading voice in advocating for their movement to Israel. In 1966 he chaired the Ad hoc Commission on Rights of Soviet Jews organized by the Conference on the Status of Soviet Jews, leading a panel of six jurors in the commission's public tribunal on Jewish life in the USSR. The commission collected testimony from Soviet Jews and compiled it in a report delivered to the secretary-general of the United Nations. The report urged the international community to demand that Soviet authorities allow Jews to practice their religion, preserve their culture, and emigrate from the USSR at will. Through the 1970s and 1980s Rustin wrote several articles on the subject of Soviet Jewry and appeared at Soviet Jewry movement rallies, demonstrations, vigils, and conferences in the U.S. and abroad. He co-sponsored the National Interreligious Task Force on Soviet Jewry. Rustin worked closely with Senator Henry Jackson on the Jackson–Vanik amendment, legislation that restricted U.S. trade with the Soviet Union due to its treatment of Jews.

=== Gay rights ===
Rustin's romantic relationships were mainly with men. Davis Platt, Rustin's partner in the 1940s, said, "I never had any sense at all that Bayard felt any shame or guilt about his homosexuality. That was rare in those days. Rare." Rustin's family openly accepted his sexual orientation.

Rustin did not engage in gay rights activism until the 1980s. He was urged to do so by his partner, Walter Naegle, who said, "I think that if I hadn't been in the office at that time, when these invitations [from gay organizations] came in, he probably wouldn't have done them." He was an advocate for people with HIV/AIDS, and because of his public works, he may have come out to the public. Rustin no longer hid his sexual orientation from others.

Because same-sex marriage was not legal at the time, Rustin and Naegle undertook to solidify their partnership and protect their union by adoption. In 1982, Rustin adopted Naegle, 30 years old at the time. Naegle said that Rustin:

was concerned about protecting my rights, because gay people had no protection. At that time, marriage between a same-sex couple was inconceivable. And so he adopted me, legally adopted me, in 1982.

That was the only thing we could do to kind of legalize our relationship. We actually had to go through a process as if Bayard was adopting a small child. My biological mother had to sign a legal paper, a paper disowning me. They had to send a social worker to our home. When the social worker arrived, she had to sit us down to talk to us to make sure that this was a fit home.

Rustin testified in favor of the New York City Gay Rights Bill. In 1986, he gave a speech titled "The New Niggers Are Gays", in which he asserted:

Today, blacks are no longer the litmus paper or the barometer of social change. Blacks are in every segment of society and there are laws that help to protect them from racial discrimination. The new "niggers" are gays... It is in this sense that gay people are the new barometer for social change... The question of social change should be framed with the most vulnerable group in mind: gay people.

Also in 1986, Rustin was invited to contribute to the book In the Life: A Black Gay Anthology. He declined, saying:

I was not involved in the struggle for gay rights as a youth ... I did not "come out of the closet" voluntarily—circumstances forced me out. While I have no problem with being publicly identified as homosexual, it would be dishonest of me to present myself as one who was in the forefront of the struggle for gay rights ... I fundamentally consider sexual orientation to be a private matter. As such, it has not been a factor which has greatly influenced my role as an activist.

=== Later years and the conservative movement ===
Commentary editor-in-chief Norman Podhoretz had commissioned "From Protest to Politics" in 1965. Nathan Abrams, in his book about Podhoretz and Commentary notes that Rustin was a "strange addition" to the magazine as a Black leftist. The magazine later promoted the neoconservative movement, which had implications for civil rights initiatives as well as other economic aspects of society. Rustin wrote an article attacking the Black Panthers, an example of the magazine's increasing focus on combating the New Left. As Commentary moved further to the right in the 1970s, and the Civil Rights era Black-Jewish alliance fragmented, Abrams notes that Rustin became "conspicuously absent" from its pages, a sign of this divergence. In 1985, Rustin praised Podhoretz for refusing to "pander to minority groups" and opposing affirmative action quotas in hiring as well as Black studies programs in colleges.

Because of these positions, many of Rustin's former colleagues in the civil rights movement, especially those connected to grassroots organizing, criticized him as a "sellout". Biographer John D'Emilio rejects these characterizations, and "portrays the final third of Rustin's life as one in which his reputation among his former allies was routinely questioned. After decades of working outside the system, they simply could not accept working within the system." But Randall Kennedy wrote in 2003 that descriptions of Rustin as "a bought man" are "at least partly true", arguing that his sponsorship by the AFL–CIO brought him some financial stability but imposed boundaries on his politics.

Kennedy notes that despite Rustin's political evolution, he remained a lifelong socialist, and D'Emilio argues that in the final phase of his life, Rustin remained on the left: "D'Emilio explains, even as Rustin was taking what appeared to be a more 'conservative' turn, he remained committed to social justice. Rustin was making radical and ambitious demands for a basic redistribution of wealth in American society, including universal healthcare, the abolition of poverty, and full employment."

James Kirchick writes that

For his heresies against progressive dogma, Mr. Rustin was derided as a “neoconservative.” [...] But while Mr. Rustin may have taken part in various neoconservative initiatives and counted individual neoconservatives as friends and allies, he was not himself an adherent of this ideological persuasion. Unlike most of the thinkers and activists associated with neoconservatism, Mr. Rustin never abandoned his social democratic convictions, nor did he endorse Ronald Reagan. On the contrary, he wrote that “insensitivity and lack of compassion increasingly are becoming the hallmarks of the Reagan administration’s domestic program” and stated that the Black poor “have been victimized by years of Reaganism.”

== Death ==
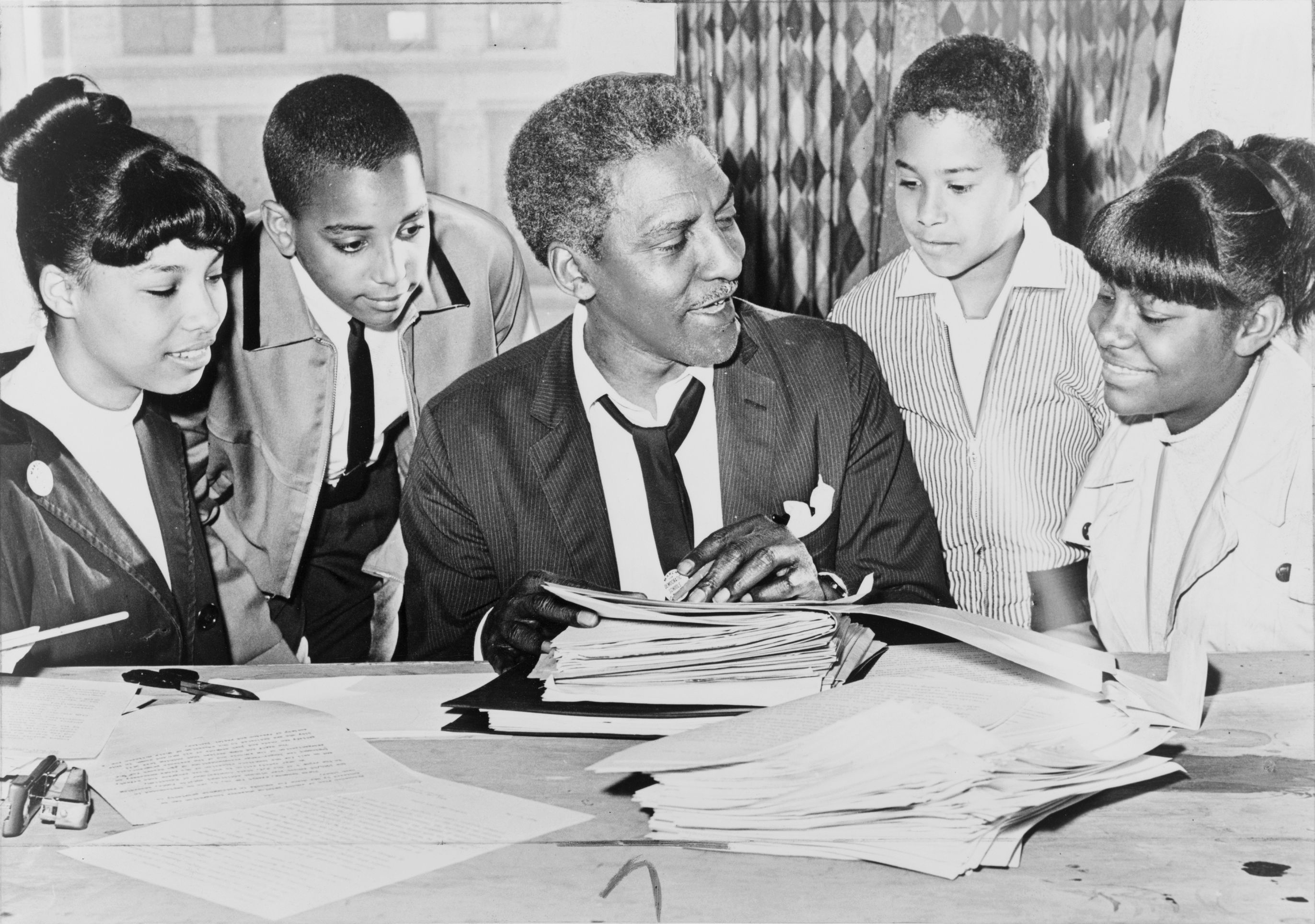
Rustin speaks with civil rights activists before a demonstration, 1964.

Rustin died aged 75 at 12:02 A.M. on August 24, 1987, at Lenox Hill Hospital from a cardiac arrest after undergoing surgery for peritonitis and a perforated appendix. He was survived by Naegle.

President Ronald Reagan issued a statement upon Rustin's death, praising his work for civil rights and "for human rights throughout the world".

== Legacy ==
External videos
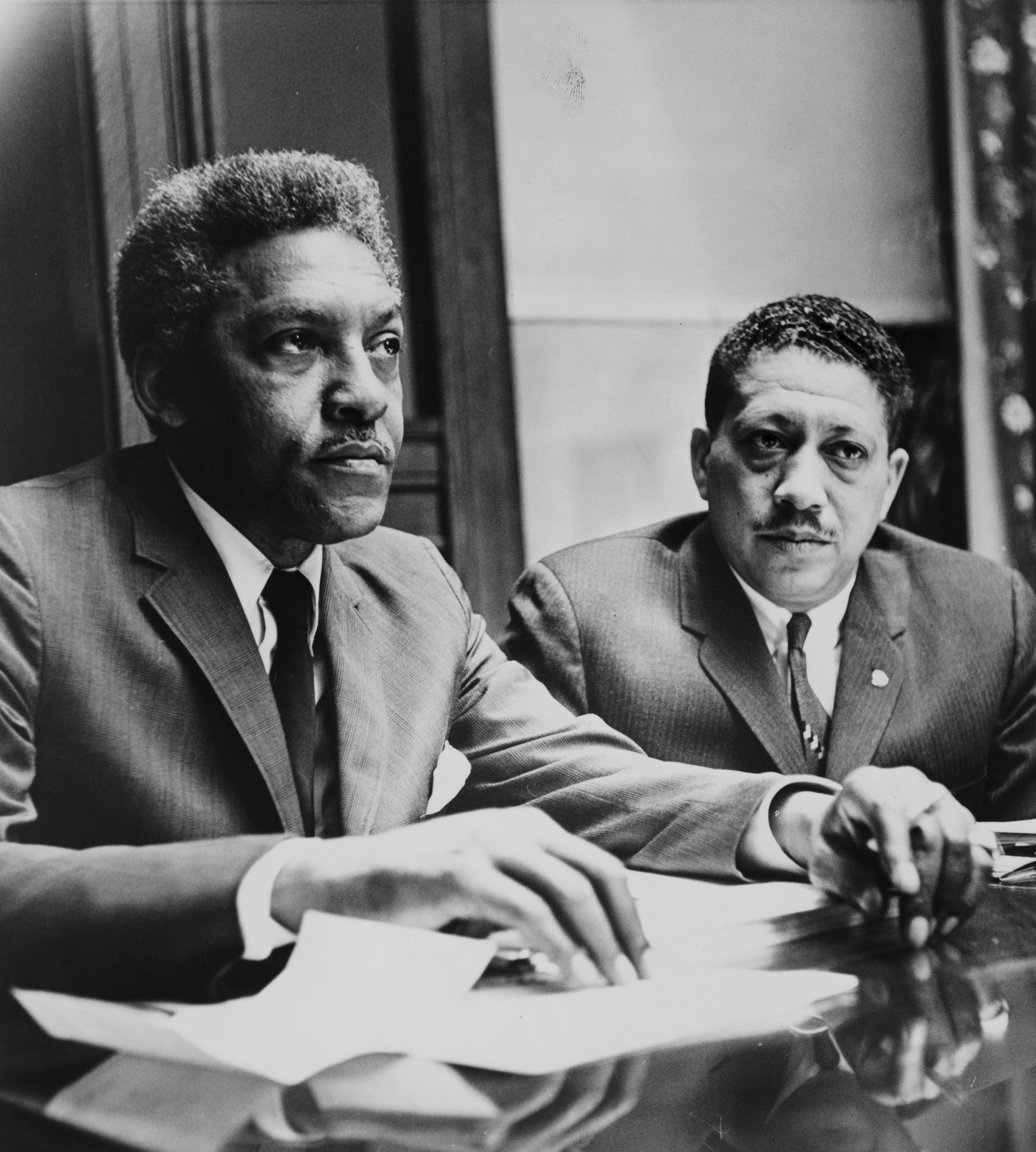
- Rustin and Eugene Reed
- Vietnam: A Television History; Homefront USA; Interview with Bayard Rustin, 1982, 39:32, WGBH-TV
- The Bayard Rustin Papers, 1:05:32, Library of Congress

According to journalist Steve Hendrix, Rustin "faded from the shortlist of well-known civil rights lions" in part because he was active behind the scenes and also because of public discomfort with his sexual orientation and former communist affiliation. In addition, Rustin's tilt rightwards in the late 1960s led him into disagreement with most civil rights leaders. But the 2003 documentary film Brother Outsider: The Life of Bayard Rustin, a Sundance Festival Grand Jury Prize nominee, and the March 2012 centennial of Rustin's birth contributed to renewed recognition of his contributions.

Rustin served as chairman of Social Democrats, USA, which, The Washington Post wrote in 2013, "was a breeding ground for many neoconservatives". French historian Justin Vaïsse called Rustin a "right-wing socialist" and "second age neoconservative", citing his role as vice-chair of the Coalition for a Democratic Majority, which was involved in the second incarnation of the Committee on the Present Danger. Adam Gopnik writes that

attempts to kidnap Rustin for neoconservatism run up against his equally dogged commitment to a social-democratic program of vast government initiatives and investments. His dream was always of a new New Deal that would go further than the original one had, lifting all boats not by some rising tide of affluence but by giving everyone the same ship and the same sail. He has been praised by Marxist historians for his refusal to reduce inequality to a matter of psychology, of what white people think about Black people, and by neoconservatives for his repudiation of the totalitarian left—though the Marxists dislike his anti-Communism and the neocons dislike his socialism.

According to Daniel Richman, former clerk for United States Supreme Court Justice Thurgood Marshall, Marshall's friendship with Rustin, who was open about his homosexuality, played a significant role in Marshall's dissent from the court's 5–4 decision upholding the constitutionality of state sodomy laws in the 1986 case Bowers v. Hardwick.

Several buildings have been named in honor of Rustin, including the Bayard Rustin Educational Complex in Chelsea, Manhattan, and the Bayard Rustin High School near his hometown of West Chester, Pennsylvania. Rustin is one of just two men to have participated in the Penn Relays and had a school named in their honor that participates in the relays. Other buildings include the Bayard Rustin Library at the Affirmations Gay/Lesbian Community Center in Ferndale, Michigan; the Bayard Rustin Social Justice Center in Conway, Arkansas; the Bayard Rustin Center for Social Justice in Princeton, New Jersey; and the Bayard Rustin Room at Friends House in London.

In 1968, two months after King's assassination, Montclair State University gave Rustin an honorary Doctor of Letters degree. In 1985, Haverford College awarded Rustin an honorary doctorate in law. Rustin received at least 15 honorary degrees from institutions including Harvard, Yale, and Brown.

=== 1990s and 2000s ===
In 1995, a Pennsylvania State Historical Marker was placed on the grounds of Henderson High School, which Rustin attended.

The 1998 anthology movie Out of the Past features letters and archival footage of Rustin.

In 2002, the West Chester Area School District approved the creation of Bayard Rustin High School, which opened in 2006.

In 2003, a documentary about Rustin titled Brother Outsider: The Life of Bayard Rustin would be released, and also serve as an episode of the PBS TV series POV.

In 2007, a group of San Francisco Bay Area Black LGBT community leaders formed the Bayard Rustin Coalition (BRC), which promotes greater Black participation in the electoral process, advances civil and human rights issues, and promotes Rustin's legacy.

=== 2010s and beyond ===
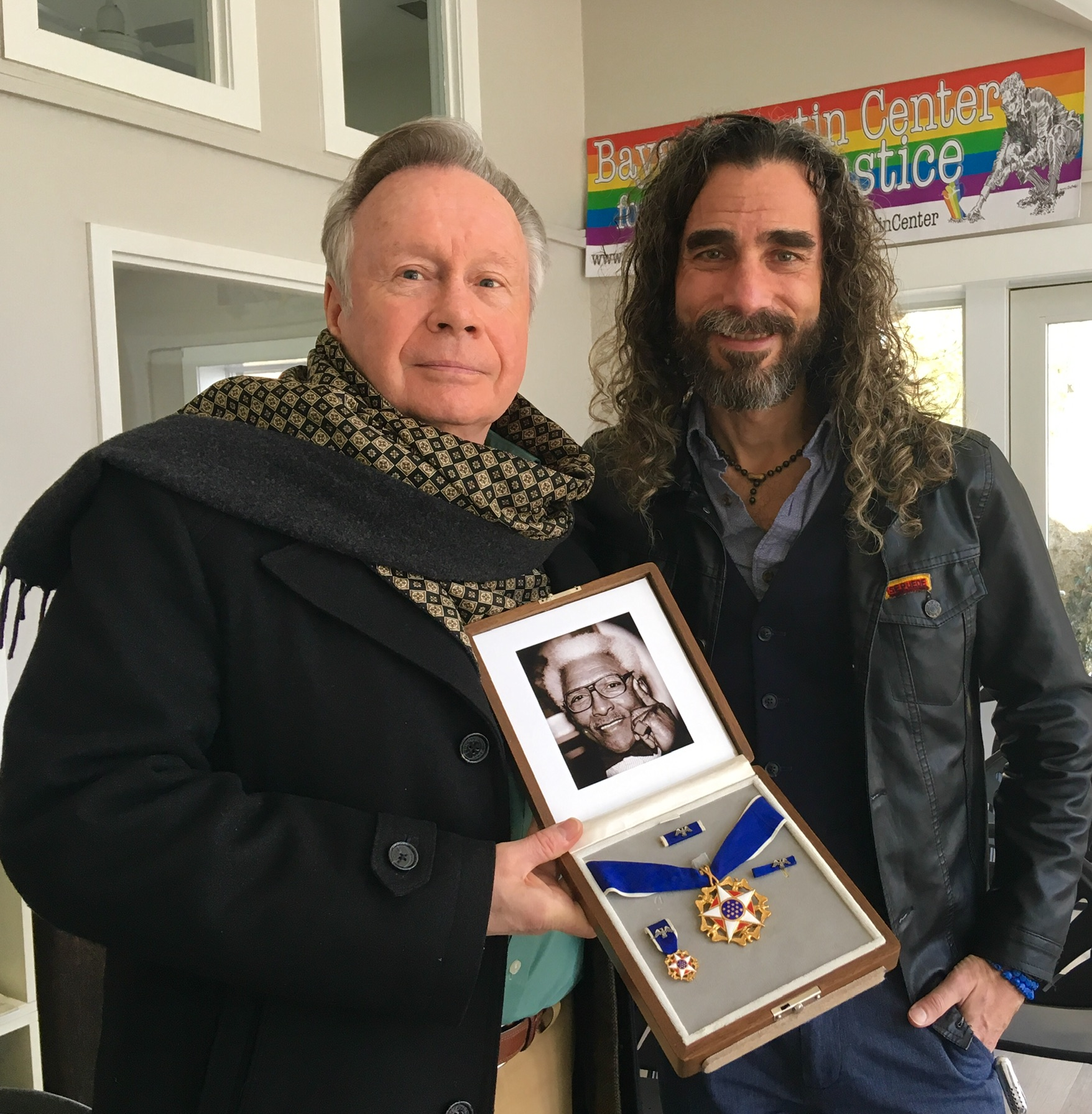
Walter Naegle & Robt Seda-Schreiber with Medal of Freedom awarded posthumously by President Barack Obama to Bayard Rustin.

In 2011, Guilford College rededicated its Queer and Allied Resource Center as the Bayard Rustin Center for LGBTQA Activism, Awareness, and Reconciliation. In 2012, Rustin was inducted into the Legacy Walk, an outdoor public display in Chicago celebrating LGBTQ history and people. In 2013, Rustin was selected as an honoree in the United States Department of Labor Hall of Honor.

On August 8, 2013, President Barack Obama posthumously awarded Rustin the Presidential Medal of Freedom, the highest civilian award of the United States. The citation in the press release read:

Bayard Rustin was an unyielding activist for civil rights, dignity, and equality for all. An advisor to the Reverend Dr. Martin Luther King, Jr., he promoted nonviolent resistance, participated in one of the first Freedom Rides, organized the 1963 March on Washington for Jobs and Freedom, and fought tirelessly for marginalized communities at home and abroad. As an openly gay African American, Mr. Rustin stood at the intersection of several of the fights for equal rights.

At the White House ceremony on November 20, 2013, Obama presented Rustin's award to Walter Naegle, his partner of ten years at the time of Rustin's death.

In 2014, Rustin was one of the inaugural honorees in the Rainbow Honor Walk, a walk of fame in San Francisco noting LGBTQ people who have "made significant contributions in their fields". In 2018, the Montgomery County Board of Education in Maryland voted to name the Bayard Rustin Elementary School after Rustin.

Canadian writer Steven Elliott Jackson's play The Seat Next to the King stages an imaginary meeting and one-night stand between Rustin and Walter Jenkins of the Johnson administration. It won the award for Best Play at the 2017 Toronto Fringe Festival. Steve H. Broadnax III's play with music Bayard Rustin Inside Ashland, dramatizing Rustin's World War II prison experience and its central role in his activism, premiered on May 22, 2022, at People's Light and Theatre Company in Malvern, Pennsylvania. A 30-minute theater piece, A Quiet Roar: The Unparalleled Lives of Bayard Rustin & Sarah Mapps Douglass, written by Philadelphia freelancer and comedian Yvie Jones, imagining a 1948 encounter between Rustin and Douglass, a 19th Century Philadelphia Quaker abolitionist, educator and artist, was presented at the Arch Street Friends Meeting House in the spring and summer of 2026.

In 2018, the Bayard Rustin Center for Social Justice was established in Princeton, New Jersey, with Naegle acting as Board Member Emeritus, serving as a community activist center and safe space for LGBTQ kids, intersectional families, and marginalized people.

Rustin was one of 50 inaugural U.S. "pioneers, trailblazers, and heroes" inducted in June 2019 to the National LGBTQ Wall of Honor, within the Stonewall National Monument (SNM), the first U.S. national monument dedicated to LGBTQ rights and queer history, at New York City's Stonewall Inn.

In January 2020, California State Senator Scott Wiener, chair of the California Legislative LGBT Caucus, and Assemblywoman Shirley Weber, chair of the California Legislative Black Caucus, called for Governor Gavin Newsom to issue a pardon for Rustin's 1953 Pasadena arrest, citing Rustin's legacy as a civil rights icon. Newsom issued the pardon on February 5 while also announcing a new process for fast-tracking pardons for those convicted under laws criminalizing homosexuality. On June 5, 2023, the Pasadena City Council adopted a resolution declaring that the "City of Pasadena celebrates and concurs in the Governor's 2020 pardon of Bayard Rustin".

In 2021, Higher Ground Productions, founded by Michelle and Barack Obama, announced production of Rustin, a biographical film directed by George C. Wolfe and starring Colman Domingo. The film premiered at the Telluride Film Festival on August 31, 2023, screened at the Toronto International Film Festival on September 13, received a limited theatrical release on November 3, and was released on Netflix on November 17. Reviews were generally positive, with Domingo's performance garnering numerous accolades, including Best Actor nominations for the Academy Award, BAFTA Award, and Golden Globe Award.

In 2022, a street in Nyack, New York, was renamed "Bayard Rustin Way".

Bayard Rustin Arrests (Chronological)
Year	Location	Reason for Arrest	Bail	Conviction / Outcome
1942	Kentucky-Tennessee (interstate bus)	Refusal to move to the back of a segregated bus. Nonviolent resistance to Jim Crow laws.	No official record of bail	Arrested, battered, briefly jailed. Not prosecuted or convicted. Rustin would later describe the incident as formative to his philosophy of nonviolence.
1944	Refused the draft in New York City. Served sentence at federal prisons in Ashland, KY and Lewisburg, PA	Refused conscription as a conscientious objector during World War Two, rejecting both combatant and alternative service.	Federal sentence (No Bail)	Convicted under the Selective Service Act. Sentenced to 3 years; served an estimated 26 months in federal prisons. While incarcerated, Rustin participated in resistance actions that eventually succeeded in desegregating the chapel services, dining and housing facilities for federal prisoners.
1947	Chapel Hill, North Carolina	Participated in the Journey of Reconciliation, the earliest freedom ride, challenging unlawful racial segregation in interstate public transportation.	No official record of bail	Convicted and sentenced to chain gang labor, Rustin served approximately 22 days. Rustin's later reports of the conditions helped end chain gangs in North Carolina.
1953	Pasadena, California	Arrested under local Vagrancy and morals laws, often used to penalize consensual same-sex relations.	No bail documented	Convicted. Rustin served 50 days in jail and was required to register as a sex offender. Posthumously pardoned in 2020.

== Publications ==
- Interracial Primer, New York: Fellowship of Reconciliation, 1943
- Interracial Workshop: Progress Report, New York: Sponsored by Congress of Racial Equality and Fellowship of Reconciliation, 1947
- Journey of Reconciliation: Report, New York: Fellowship of Reconciliation, Congress of Racial Equality, 1947
- We challenged Jim Crow! a report on the journey of reconciliation, April 9–23, 1947, New York: Fellowship of Reconciliation, Congress of Racial Equality, 1947
- "In apprehension how like a god!", Philadelphia: Young Friends Movement 1948
- The Revolution in the South, Cambridge, Massachusetts.: Peace Education Section, American Friends Service Committee, 1950s
- Report on Montgomery, Alabama, New York: War Resisters League, 1956
- A report and action suggestions on non-violence in the South, New York: War Resisters League, 1957
- Civil Rights: The True Frontier, New York: Donald Press, 1963
- From Protest to Politics: The Future of the Civil Rights Movement, New York: League for Industrial Democracy, 1965
- The City in Crisis (introduction), New York: A. Philip Randolph Educational Fund, 1965
- "Black Power" and Coalition Politics, New York, American Jewish Committee, 1966
- Which way? (with Daniel Patrick Moynihan), New York: American Press, 1966
- The Watts "Manifesto" & the McCone report., New York, League for Industrial Democracy, 1966
- Fear, frustration, backlash: the new crisis in civil rights, New York: Jewish Labor Committee, 1966
- The Lessons of the Long Hot Summer, New York: American Jewish Committee, 1967
- The Negro Community: frustration politics, sociology and economics, Detroit: UAW Citizenship-Legislative Department, 1967
- A Way Out of the Exploding Ghetto, New York: League for Industrial Democracy, 1967
- The alienated: the young rebels today and why they're different, Washington, D.C.: International Labor Press Association, 1967
- "Right to work" laws: a trap for America's minorities, New York: A. Philip Randolph Institute, 1967
- Civil rights: the movement re-examined (contributor), New York: A. Philip Randolph Educational Fund, 1967
- Separatism or integration, which way for America?: a dialogue (with Robert Browne), New York: A. Philip Randolph Educational Fund, 1968
- The Report of the National Advisory Commission on Civil Disorders, an analysis, New York: American Jewish Committee, 1968
- The labor-Negro Coalition, a new beginning, Washington, D.C.: American Federationist?, 1968
- The anatomy of frustration, New York: Anti-Defamation League of B'nai B'rith, 1968
- Morals Concerning Minorities, Mental Health and Identity, New York: A. Philip Randolph Institute, 1969
- Black Studies: Myths & Realities (contributor), New York: A. Philip Randolph Educational Fund, 1969
- Conflict or Coalition?: the civil rights struggle and the trade union movement today, New York: A. Philip Randolph Institute, 1969
- Three Essays, New York: A. Philip Randolph Institute, 1969
- Black Rage, White Fear: The Full Employment Answer: An Address, Washington, D.C.: Bricklayers, Masons & Plasterers International Union, 1970
- A Word to Black Students, New York: A. Philip Randolph Institute, 1970
- The Failure of Black Separatism, New York: A. Philip Randolph Institute, 1970
- The Blacks and the Unions (contributor), New York: A. Philip Randolph Educational Fund, 1971
- Down the line; the collected writings of Bayard Rustin, Chicago: Quadrangle Books, 1971
- Affirmative action in an economy of scarcity (with Norman Hill), New York: A. Philip Randolph Institute, 1974
- Seniority and racial progress (with Norman Hill), New York: A. Philip Randolph Institute, 1975
- Have we reached the end of the second reconstruction?, Bloomington, Indiana: The Poynter Center, 1976
- Strategies for freedom: the changing patterns of Black protest, New York: Columbia University Press, 1976
- Africa, Soviet imperialism and the retreat of American power, New York: Social Democrats, USA (reprint), 1978
- South Africa: is peaceful change possible? a report (contributor), New York: New York Friends Group, 1984
- Time on two crosses: the collected writings of Bayard Rustin, San Francisco: Cleis Press, 2003
- I Must Resist: Bayard Rustin's Life in Letters: City Lights, 2012

== See also ==
- List of civil rights leaders
- Timeline of the civil rights movement
- Rustin, a 2023 American biographical drama film directed by George C. Wolfe about Bayard Rustin.
