= Gang of Four (disambiguation) =

The Gang of Four was a political faction of four Chinese Communist Party officials, prominent during the Cultural Revolution 1966–1976.

Gang of Four may also refer to:

== Arts and entertainment ==
- Gang of Four (band), an English post-punk band
- Gang of Four (board game), by Days of Wonder
- Gang of Four, 2004 novel by Liz Byrski
- Gang of Four (film), a 1989 French film

== Businesses ==
- Gang of Four (Indonesia): Sudono Salim, Sutanto Djuhar, Ibrahim Risjad, Sudwikatmono

== Political groups ==
- Gang of Four (Afghanistan): Aslam Watanjar, Sayed Muhammad Gulabzoy, Sherjan Mazdoryar, Asadullah Sarwar use
- Gang of Four (Australian Labor Party): Kevin Rudd, Julia Gillard, Wayne Swan, Lindsay Tanner
- Gang of Four (Australian Democrats): Lyn Allison, John Cherry, Andrew Murray, Aden Ridgeway
- Gang of Four (Harlem), U.S.: David Dinkins, Basil Paterson, Charles Rangel, Percy Sutton
- Gang of Four (Pakistan): two different uses to describe four generals
- Gang of Four (Papua New Guinea): Mekere Morauta, Charles Lepani, Rabbie Namaliu and Anthony Siaguru
- Gang of Four (pro-Contra) in the U.S.: Bernard W. Aronson, Bruce P. Cameron, Robert S. Leiken, Penn Kemble
- Gang of Four (SDP), UK: four politicians who founded the Social Democratic Party
- Gang of Four (Seattle), U.S.: Bernie Whitebear, Bob Santos, Roberto Maestas, Larry Gossett
- Gang of Four Colorado, U.S. mostly Democratic multi-millionaires - the Four Horsemen: Pat Stryker, Jared Polis, Tim Gill, Rutt Bridges

== Technology ==
- Big Four tech companies, or Gang of Four: Alphabet, Amazon, Apple and Meta
- Gang of Four (software), authors of computing book Design Patterns
- Gang of Four (Cisco, DEC, StrataCom and Nortel) who set a standard for a Local Management Interface in networking

== Other groups ==
- Gang of Four paper by Kreps, Milgrom, Roberts and Wilson, about game theory and reputation formation

== See also ==
- Big Four (disambiguation)
- Four Asian Tigers: the economies of Hong Kong, Singapore, South Korea and Taiwan
- Four group (disambiguation)
- Gang of 14, a bipartisan group of U.S. Senators in the 109th Congress
