= Penn Kemble =

American political activist (1941–2005)

Penn Kemble at the time of his election as National Secretary of the Socialist Party in 1968.

Richard Penn Kemble (January 21, 1941 – October 15, 2005), commonly known as "Penn," was an American political activist and a founding member of Social Democrats, USA. He supported democracy and labor unions in the US and internationally, and so was active in the civil rights movement, the labor movement, and the social-democratic opposition to communism. He founded organizations including Negotiations Now! and Frontlash, and he served as director of the Committee for Democracy in Central America. Kemble was appointed to various government boards and institutions throughout the 1990s, eventually becoming the acting director of the U.S. Information Agency under President Bill Clinton.

== Biography ==
=== Early years ===
Penn Kemble was born in Worcester, Massachusetts in 1941 and grew up in Lancaster, Pennsylvania. He studied at the University of Colorado at Boulder in the early 1960s, where he helped to organize a local branch of the Young People's Socialist League, the youth section of the Socialist Party of America. While at the University of Colorado, Kemble was influenced by the thinking of Alex Garber, a professor of sociology, who was a social democratic anti-communist.

After moving to New York, Kemble stood out as a neatly dressed, muscular Protestant youth, in an urban political setting that was predominantly Catholic and Jewish. He worked at The New York Times but was fired for refusing to cross a picket line during a typesetters' strike. A leader in the East River chapter of the Congress of Racial Equality, Kemble helped to organize a non-violent blockade of the Triborough Bridge during rush hour, to raise consciousness among suburbanites of the lives of Harlem residents.

=== Political career ===
From the middle 1960s, Kemble was active in the youth section of the Socialist Party of America, the Young People's Socialist League (YPSL). In the Party, Kemble's realignment caucus attained majority of the votes in 1968. His caucus included Paul Feldman, editor of the party paper New America and Tom Kahn, chief of the League for Industrial Democracy. Kemble was elected as the National Chairman of the YPSL, thereby becoming an ex officio member of the National Committee of the Socialist Party. Following its July 1968 National Convention the governing National Committee elected Kemble the new National Secretary of the Socialist Party, replacing George Woywod. He was also active in the Congress of Racial Equality.

Kemble was Executive Secretary of the Socialist Party of America from 1968 to 1970. Kemble was a founder of Negotiation Now!, a group which called for an end to the bombing of North Vietnam and a negotiated settlement of the Vietnam War. He was opposed to a unilateral withdrawal of U.S. forces from Vietnam. In 1972, Kemble organized a protest of the Coalition for a New Foreign and Military Policy, featuring a picket line of 76 Vietnamese. Kemble's protest infuriated its master of ceremonies, Bruce P. Cameron.

In 1972, Kemble was a founder the Coalition for a Democratic Majority (CDM), an association of centrist Democrats that opposed the "new politics" liberalism exemplified by Senator George McGovern, who suffered the worst defeat of a Presidential candidate in modern times, despite the widespread dislike of Nixon. Kemble was executive director of CDM from 1972 to 1976, at which time he left to become a special assistant and speechwriter for Senator Daniel Patrick Moynihan. He remained with Moynihan until 1979.

Concerned about the direct and indirect role of the Communist Party USA and of sympathizers of Marxist-Leninist politics in the US Peace Movement and in the National Council of Churches, Kemble helped found the Institute on Religion and Democracy.

From 1981 until 1988 was the President of the Committee for Democracy in Central America (PRODEMCA), which criticized Marxist–Leninists in Central America, especially the Sandinistas in Nicaragua and the FMLN in Central America; PRODEMCA was also referred to as "Friends of the Democratic Center in Central America". PRODEMCA channelled funds from the National Endowment for Democracy to opposition groups in Nicaragua and lobbied for military aid to the contras by taking out full-page newspaper ads and contacting members of Congress. Kemble lobbied Congress to support the Christian Democratic President of El Salvador José Napoleón Duarte, during the Salvadoran Civil War; he also argued that Congress should fund the Nicaraguan Contras, who were then engaged in an armed campaign against the Sandinistas, to pressure the Sandinistas to negotiate a peace treaty with more guarantees for the civic opposition. In his support of Congressional funding of the Contras, Kemble was one of the "Gang of Four" of prominent social-democrats or opponents of the Vietnam War; a second was a former antagonist during the Vietnam War, Bruce Cameron, and the others were Robert S. Leiken and Bernard W. Aronson. The Gang of Four differed from the Reagan Administration on some questions. For example, they supported efforts to transfer control of Contra funding from the CIA and Department of Defense to the Department of State's United States Agency for International Development; they also supported negotiations opposed by Reagan Administration "hard-liners" who wished to defeat the Sandinistas, according to Cameron. Kemble's 1980s Central American politics were unpopular among liberals and democratic socialists in the Democratic Party.

A private group that channeled U.S. government funds to opposition groups in Nicaragua and lobbied for military aid to the contras is offering free tours of contra base camps in Honduras to selected travelers.

He supported the Bill Clinton's campaign for the Presidency. During the Presidency of Bill Clinton, Kemble served first in 1993 as the deputy director and then in 1999 as acting director of the U.S. Information Agency. He was also made a special representative of Secretary of State Madeleine K. Albright to the Council for a Community of Democracies initiative.

In 2001, Kemble was appointed to the Board of International Broadcasting by President George W. Bush. He also became the Washington, D.C. representative of Freedom House; in his last years, he was especially involved in supporting peace efforts in the Middle East. He declined several offers of official positions in the Bush administration. However, Secretary of State Colin L. Powell appointed Kemble to be the Chairman of the International Eminent Persons Group on Slavery, Abduction and Forced Servitude in Sudan.

=== Death and legacy ===
Kemble died on October 15, 2005, at his home in Washington, D.C. after a year-long battle with brain cancer. He was 64 years old at the time of his death and was survived by his wife, two sisters, and his brother. Kemble referred to himself as a social democrat throughout his life.
