= GOF =

GOF may refer to:

== Arts and entertainment ==
- Galaxy on Fire, a video game series
- Harry Potter and the Goblet of Fire, a 2000 novel by J. K. Rowling

== Organisations ==
- Gamers Outreach Foundation, an American philanthropic organization
- General Operations Force, of the Malaysian police
- Grand Orient de France, a Masonic organization in France
- An Gof, a Cornish militant organization

== Places ==
- Gulf of Finland
- Golf Street railway station, in Angus, Scotland

== Other uses ==
- Gain-of-function, a property of a genetic mutation
- Gamo-Gofa-Dawro language, spoken in Ethiopia
- Gang of Four (disambiguation)
- Goodness of fit
