= Four group =

Four group or Group of Four may refer to:

- Klein four-group
- Four note group
- G4 nations
- Lucky Four Group
- Clause Four Group

== See also ==
- Gang of Four (disambiguation)
