= Donna Lee =

Jazz composition

"Donna Lee" is a jazz standard attributed to Charlie Parker, although Miles Davis has also claimed authorship. Written in A-flat, it is based on the chord changes of the jazz standard "(Back Home Again in) Indiana". Beginning with an unusual half-bar rest, "Donna Lee" is a very complex, fast-moving chart with a compositional style based on four-note groups over each change.

== Authorship ==
"Donna Lee" was originally attributed to Charlie Parker on the original 78-rpm recordings and was copyrighted under his name in 1947. However, in various interviews and publications since, Miles Davis has claimed to be the composer. Among these is a statement Davis made in his autobiography: "I wrote a tune for the album called 'Donna Lee', which was the first tune of mine that was ever recorded. But when the record came out, it listed Bird [Parker] as the composer. It wasn't Bird's fault, though. The record company just made a mistake." Although Davis claimed being the author, noted composer, arranger Gil Evans in a radio interview on WKCR FM, NYC stated publicly that the true author of the piece was composer drummer Tiny Kahn who taught the melody to Davis who then taught it to Parker.

== Recordings ==
"Donna Lee" was recorded by the Charlie Parker Quintet on May 8, 1947, for Savoy in New York City. Musicians with Parker for the session were Miles Davis (trumpet), Bud Powell (piano), Tommy Potter (bass), and Max Roach (drums). "Donna Lee" was the first of four tunes recorded during the session and was recorded over four takes, the fourth being the master take.

Later in 1947 it was recorded for Decca by Claude Thornhill and his orchestra, which included Gil Evans, Lee Konitz, Gerry Mulligan, Sandy Siegelstein, Bill Barber, and Joe Shulman. Some of these musicians were later hired by Miles Davis for his album Birth of the Cool. Evans approached Davis for permission to write the arrangement of "Donna Lee" for Thornhill. Davis agreed and then got the idea to "imitate the sound of Claude Thornhill but with less people" for his nonet recordings, as he says in his autobiography.

Jazz bassist Jaco Pastorius recorded a version of "Donna Lee" on bass guitar, with Don Alias on congas, for his debut album Jaco Pastorius (1976). His friend Pat Metheny called this version "astounding" because of its "hornlike phrasing that was previously unknown to the bass guitar" and "one of the freshest looks at how to play on a well traveled set of chord changes in recent jazz history". "Donna Lee" has also been recorded by Karrin Allyson, Anthony Braxton, Steve Lacy, Nick Brignola, Clifford Brown, Ryan Kisor, Lee Konitz, Warne Marsh, Tito Puente, Steve Bailey, Victor Wooten, Alain Caron and Wallace Roney.

Pianist John Beasley won the 2021 Best Arrangement, Instrumental Or A Cappella Grammy Award on March 14, 2021, for his arrangement of "Donna Lee" performed by his big band, MONK'estra, from the album MONK'estra Plays John Beasley, on Mack Avenue Records.

== Name origin ==
The piece is most likely named after bassist Curly Russell's daughter, Donna Lee Russell.

== See also ==
- List of jazz contrafacts
