= Gang of Four (pro-Contra) =

Four advocates of U.S. funding for the Nicaraguan Contras

In the U.S. political history of the 1980s, the Gang of Four refers to Bernard W. Aronson, Bruce P. Cameron, Robert S. Leiken, and Penn Kemble, four advocates of U.S. Congressional funding for the Nicaraguan Contras, who were engaged in an armed campaign in opposition to the Sandinista government, during the Reagan presidency. The four were prominent policy analysts and activists in the U.S. Democratic Party.

== Background ==
During the 1980s in Nicaragua, the Contras were engaged in an armed campaign against the Sandinista government. In the beginning, the Contras consisted largely of former members of the National Guard of Somoza, the dictator who had been overthrown in the 1979 Revolution. The Contras were joined also by former revolutionaries who had turned against the Sandinista policies; a third source of personnel were farmers angered by the Sandinista land reform and American Indians.

In response, several Miskito groups eventually formed guerrilla groups in the 1980s, which carried on armed struggle against the central government. On February 25, 1982, Steadman Fagoth, one of the guerrilla leaders, took refuge in Honduras along with 3,000 Miskitos. The Sandinistas began to denounce the activities of Contras in the Rio Coco zone. The Miskitos occupied the village of San Carlos during the "Red December" (December 20–21, 1982) during which several Sandinista soldiers were killed. In retaliation, the state massacred 30 Miskitos in the following days, prompting many of them to escape to Honduras to live in a difficult state of exile. The state of emergency in the Rio Coco zone was proclaimed in 1983, and lasted until 1988.

In 1983 the Misurasata movement, led by Brooklyn Rivera, split, with the breakaway Misura group of Stedman Fagoth allying itself more closely with the FDN, one of the first Contras commanded by Enrique Bermúdez. A subsequent autonomy statute in September 1987 largely defused Miskito resistance.

The Contras had financial and military support from the Central Intelligence Agency of the U.S. However, a CIA-supported manual advocating killing Sandinista politicians and poisoning wells in Nicaragua, as well as mining harbors, provoked a backlash. The House Appropriations Bill of 1982 contained the Boland Amendment, which outlawed U.S. assistance to the Contras for the purpose of overthrowing the Nicaraguan government, while allowing assistance for other purposes. Having been passed unanimously, the appropriations bill was signed by President Ronald Reagan on December 21, 1982. The Boland Amendment enjoyed wide support among Democrats but had been opposed by the Reagan administration.

Soon after they had blocked Contra aid, Congressional Democrats were embarrassed and politically vulnerable because of the Sandinistas. Very soon after the vote, Nicaraguan President Daniel Ortega announced that he would visit the Soviet Union. The Speaker of the House, Tip O'Neill, a liberal Democrat, was troubled by reports of harassment of the Catholic Church. Some Sandinistas had earlier endorsed the Communist crack-down on Poland's labor movement, Solidarity.

== Advocacy of Congressional funding of Contras ==
The Gang of Four were four advocates of U.S. Congressional funding for the Contras, who were notable for being prominent Democrats.

=== Leiken's criticism of Nicaraguan Sandinistas in 1984 ===
In October 1984, The New Republic published "Nicaragua's Untold Stories", which criticized the Sandinistas for economic mismanagement, corruption, and violations of human rights. The author was Robert S. Leiken, a Democratic policy analyst who had previously been an opponent of the Vietnam War.

The turning point came in the fall of 1984, when, after an intense 10 day trip to Nicaragua, Leiken returned "appalled and angry" over conditions there. He wrote an article criticizing the Sandinistas in terms that were, for a liberal Democrat, unmistakably powerful and all the more striking because they appeared in the traditionally liberal The New Republic.

Leiken's article caused controversy among Democrats, according to Time magazine:

The idea that a well respected liberal analyst would launch such a strong attack on the Sandinistas caused considerable stir in Washington. Leiken's apparent conversion was seen by the entrenched left as a betrayal and by Reaganites as a vindication of their long held views. Most important, many Democrats who had relied on Leiken's analyses began to reconsider their Sandinista sympathies. Senator Edward Kennedy had the article read into the Congressional Record. Suddenly, Leiken became as controversial as Nicaragua itself.

=== Other advocacy ===
Bernard W. Aronson helped to draft President Reagan's speech on Contra aid, which influenced moderate Democrats. Excerpts were introduced into the Congressional Record. Their goal was not to overthrow the democratically elected Sandinista government, but to pressure the Sandinistas to negotiate a peace treaty with the Contras. They differed from the Reagan administration on some questions. For example, they supported efforts to transfer control of Contra funding from the Central Intelligence Agency and Department of Defense to the Department of State's USAID; they also supported negotiations opposed by Reagan administration "hard-liners" who wished to overthrow the Sandinistas.

All four members were nationally prominent Democratic policy analysts who had criticized the conduct of the Vietnam War. Their advocacy of Congressional funding for the Contras was unpopular among liberals and progressives in the Democratic Party. The label "Gang of Four", alluding to the Chinese Gang of Four who had allegedly sought a revival of the Maoist Cultural Revolution, was ironic.

== See also ==
- Boland Amendment
- Esquipulas Peace Agreement
- Nicaragua v. United States
