= Frontlash =

- Frontlash
- Founded: 1968
- Dissolved: 1997
- Location: United States of America
- Affiliations: AFL-CIO

Frontlash was a non-profit organization founded in 1968 to help minority and young people register to vote and to engage in voter education. Initially sponsored by the AFL-CIO, the United States Youth Council, and the NAACP Youth Council, the AFL-CIO became the group's most important financial sponsor and essentially took over Frontlash in 1971, becoming the labor federation's outreach program to younger Americans. Frontlash folded in 1997.

The organization was conceived by Penn Kemble, a Social Democrat and member of the Young People's Socialist League. The "Frontlash" name was a play on words, originally used in this context by President Lyndon B. Johnson in 1964 (it had previously been used in analogue computer construction and similar). The organization would work to counteract the "backlash" against liberalism by blue-collar workers. Kemble was the organization's first executive director.

== Structure ==
Frontlash was funded almost entirely by the AFL-CIO after 1971. It was led by an executive director, who was appointed by the president of the AFL-CIO. Membership in Frontlash was extended to anyone, although the organization focused on building membership among people 30 years of age and younger. Local chapters formed primarily on college campuses, but some chapters formed in large cities (as the creations of AFL-CIO Central Labor Councils; their membership often remained minuscule). Frontlash chapters were usually democratic in nature, although they relied heavily on funds and staff from AFL-CIO appointed leaders in the central labor bodies. This dependency significantly checked the ability of Frontlash chapters to engage in independent action.

=== Executive Directors ===
- Penn Kemble (1968-1972)
- Charlotte Roe (1972-1977)
- Gene Lynch (1977-1978)
- Jessica Smith (1978-1985)
- Joel Klaverkamp (1985-1992)
- Cheryl Graeve (1992-1996)

== 1970s ==
Frontlash conducted its first voter registration campaign in 1968. Passage of the 26th Amendment in July 1970 lowered the voting age to 18. The AFL-CIO became, with only minor exceptions, Frontlash's financial backer and essentially took over the organization. Kemble, whose interest in the organization had waned, stepped down and Charlotte Roe became the group's executive director. Frontlash's 1972 voter registration effort was extensive, focusing on the top 12 most heavily industrialized states. Frontlash's strategy was to go door-to-door and register voters. The organization also co-sponsored a Youth In Politics Institute to teach high school students their rights as voters and motivate them to get involved in politics. Frontlash also worked with the United Federation of Teachers to produce a film about voting rights which was subsequently distributed to high schools across the country. Frontlash tended to register about 3 Democrats for every 1 Republican.

== 1980s ==
In the 1980s, Frontlash focused more on economic and social issues of concern to the AFL-CIO than voter registration. In 1981, it sold more than bumper stickers, buttons and T-shirts emblazoned with the Polish flag and the word Solidarność to raise money for the Polish Workers Aid Fund—a charity established by the AFL-CIO in 1980 to help the Polish trade union, Solidarity. Under its new executive director, Jessica Smith, Frontlash also opposed the subminimum wage proposed by the Reagan administration. Its two-year culminated in protests outside Burger King restaurants nationwide. The protests included the United States Students Association, College Democrats of America, the Gray Panthers, and the National Council of Senior Citizens. The protests drew nationwide media attention, and led the Reagan administration to abandon the proposed subminimum wage. Frontlash also supported the AFL-CIO's boycott of the Coors Brewing Company, stressing Coors's donations to organizations that supported cuts in federal student aid programs. Frontlash partnered with Cesar Chavez and the United Farmworkers promoting the 'Wrath of Grapes' campaign, focusing on labor and environmental injustices in the migrant worker population, especially in the grape vineyards of California and Arizona. Frontlash also partnered with the nascent youth service organization, City Year, in 1989 and provided workers and financial backing for the group in its first year.

Frontlash's third executive director, Joel Klaverkamp, expanded the organization's permanent presence into two additional states in 1987, bringing the total to 10.

== 1990s ==
In the 1990s, Frontlash's new executive director Cheryl Graeve launched what would become the organization's most visible campaign. Known as "Toycott," the campaign—which began in 1989 but did not receive national media attention until 1991—highlighted the use of child labor in the manufacture of toys and other consumer goods in China and sold in the United States. Frontlash formed a coalition of student groups at the 500 largest universities in the U.S. to build support for the Toycott campaign. Frontlash also received the support of the National Consumers League and the Democracy for China Fund. The campaign survived Frontlash's demise in 1997, leading to the formation of United Students Against Sweatshops later that year. Deborah Owens served as the chairman of the board of directors. Other staff members included Jamal Watson, who directed the group's communication efforts and Patrick Wozny, who was the political and legislative director.

Frontlash also formed the "Student Coalition Against Busters" (SCAB), which singled out large law firms for engaging in what Frontlash called anti-union activities. It also protested against companies which recruited on college campuses and had broken their unions, most notably International Paper.

In 1994, Frontlash expanded its Toycott campaign to focus on consumer clothing and other consumer goods manufactured in sweatshops. Frontlash targeted the Phillips-Van Heusen shirt-making corporation, Nike, the Dole Food Company, Mattel and other companies whose products were created or harvested in low-wage countries. The campaign, titled "Come Shop With Me," was supported by Rep. Marcy Kaptur (D-Ohio) and was supported by the Coalition of Labor Union Women and the National Consumers League. The campaign initially failed to win much press attention, but in 1996 Frontlash began targeting Nike specifically and began setting up protests outside the company's "Niketown" stores. While the Nike protests garnered some national attention and public support, the collapse of the "Come Shop With Me" campaign significantly weakened Frontlash.

== Demise ==
The number of Frontlash chapters declined significantly in the 1990s. By 1995, only a few remained, and nationwide membership numbered in the hundreds rather than thousands. The AFL-CIO folded Frontlash's operations into other departments, and quietly shuttered the organization in 1997.
