= Australian Labor Party Caucus =

Group of elected parliamentarians in the Australian Labor Party

- Leader: Anthony Albanese
- Senate Leader: Penny Wong
- Caucus Chair: Sharon Claydon
- Chief House Whip: Joanne Ryan
- Chief Senate Whip: Tony Sheldon
- Founded: 1901
- Membership (2026): 124
- House of Representatives: 94 / 150
- Senate: 30 / 76

The Australian Labor Party Caucus comprises all Australian Labor Party (ALP) senators and members of parliament of the current Commonwealth Parliament. The Caucus determines some matters of policy, parliamentary tactics, and disciplinary measures against disobedient parliamentarians. It is alternatively known as the Federal Parliamentary Labor Party (FPLP).

The Caucus is also involved in the election of the federal parliamentary leaders from among its members, as well as their dismissal. The leader has historically been a member of the House of Representatives, but though by convention a Prime Minister is the person who has the support of a majority in the House of Representatives. Since October 2013, a ballot of both the Caucus and by the Labor Party's rank-and-file members has determined the party leader and the deputy leader. Bill Shorten was the first leader elected under the new system in late 2013. In government, the federal Caucus also chooses the Ministers, with the portfolios then allocated by the Labor Prime Minister.

The word "caucus" has American roots and is not commonly used in Australia outside of the ALP. In the non-Labor parties, such party meetings are more commonly described as a "party room".

== Caucus leadership ==
Office	Officer		Chamber	Electorate	State	Faction	Term of office
Caucus Chair		Sharon Claydon	House	Newcastle	New South Wales	Left	1 June 2022 – present (Note: Claydon has also served as Deputy Speaker of the Australian House of Representatives since 26 July 2022.)
Prime Minister		Anthony Albanese	House	Grayndler	New South Wales	Left	23 May 2022 – present
Leader of the Federal Parliamentary Labor Party		Anthony Albanese	House	Grayndler	New South Wales	Left	30 May 2019 – present
Deputy Prime Minister		Richard Marles	House	Corio	(Victoria (state)); Victoria	Right	23 May 2022 – present
Deputy Leader of the Federal Parliamentary Labor Party		Richard Marles	House	Corio	(Victoria (state)); Victoria	Right	30 May 2019 – present
Leader of the House		Tony Burke	House	Watson	New South Wales	Right	1 June 2022 – present (Note: Served as Manager of Opposition Business from 18 October 2013 to 23 May 2022)
Deputy Leader of the House		Mark Butler	House	Hindmarsh	South Australia	Left	1 June 2022 – present
Leader of the Government in the Senate		Penny Wong	Senate	Senator for South Australia	South Australia	Left	1 June 2022 – present (Note: Served as Leader of the Opposition in the Senate, 18 September 2013 to 23 May 2022)
Leader of the Labor Party in the Senate		Penny Wong	Senate	Senator for South Australia	South Australia	Left	27 June 2013 – present
Deputy Leader of the Government in the Senate		Don Farrell	Senate	Senator for South Australia	South Australia	Right	1 June 2022 – present (Note: Served as Deputy Leader of the Opposition in the Senate, 30 September 2016 to 23 May 2022)
Deputy Leader of the Labor Party in the Senate		Don Farrell	Senate	Senator for South Australia	South Australia	Right	30 September 2016 – present
Manager of Government Business in the Senate		Katy Gallagher	Senate	Senator for the Australian Capital Territory	Australian Capital Territory	Left	1 June 2022 – present (Note: Served as Manager of Opposition Business in the Senate 12 September 2016 to 6 December 2017, and again 2 June 2019 to 23 May 2022)
Deputy Manager of Government Business in the Senate	Sen. Chisholm	Anthony Chisholm	Senate	Senator for Queensland	Queensland	Right	1 June 2022–present

== Party whips ==
Office	Officer	Chamber	Electorate	State	Faction	Term of office
Chief Government Whip in the House	Joanne Ryan	House	Lalor	(Victoria (state)); Victoria	Left	31 May 2022 – present
House Whip	Anne Stanley	House	Werriwa	New South Wales	Left	31 May 2022 – present (Note: Served as Opposition Whip from 2 July 2019 to 31 May 2022)
House Whip	David Smith	House	Bean	Australian Capital Territory	Right	31 May 2022 – present
Chief Government Whip in the Senate	Tony Sheldon	Senate	Senator for New South Wales	New South Wales	Right	9 May 2025 – present
Deputy Senate Whip	Lisa Darmanin	Senate	Senator for Victoria	(Victoria (state)); Victoria	Left	9 May 2025 – present
Deputy Senate Whip	Karen Grogan	Senate	Senator for South Australia	South Australia	Left	18 March 2024 – present

== Full caucus membership ==
Member		Position	Chamber	Electorate	State	Faction	Term of office	Ref
	Basem Abdo (born 1987)	Backbench	House	Calwell	(Victoria (state)); Victoria	Left	2025–present	
Anthony Albanese	Anthony Albanese (born 1963)	Cabinet	House	Grayndler	New South Wales	Left	1996–present	
	Anne Aly (born 1967)	Cabinet	House	Cowan	Western Australia	Left	2016–present	
	Ash Ambihaipahar (born 1987)	Backbench	House	Barton	New South Wales	Left	2025–present	
Labor Party image placeholder	Michelle Ananda-Rajah (born 1972)	Backbench	Senate	Senator for Victoria	(Victoria (state)); Victoria	Right	2025–present (Note: Served as a Member of the Australian House of Representatives for Higgins, 2022–2025)	
Sen. Ayres	Tim Ayres (born 1973)	Cabinet	Senate	Senator for New South Wales	New South Wales	Left	2019–present	
Jodie Belyea	Jodie Belyea (born 1967)	Backbench	House	Dunkley	(Victoria (state)); Victoria	Left	2024–present	
	Carol Berry (born 1975)	Backbench	House	Whitlam	New South Wales	Left	2025–present	
Chris Bowen	Chris Bowen (born 1973)	Cabinet	House	McMahon	New South Wales	Right	2004–present	
	Jo Briskey (born ?)	Backbench	House	Maribyrnong	(Victoria (state)); Victoria	Left	2025–present	
Sen. Brown	Carol Brown (born 1963)	Backbench	Senate	Senator for Tasmania	Tasmania	Left	2005–present	
Tony Burke	Tony Burke (born 1969)	Cabinet	House	Watson	New South Wales	Right	2004–present	
Matt Burnell	Matt Burnell (born 1978)	Backbench	House	Spence	South Australia	Right	2022–present	
Josh Burns	Josh Burns (born 1987)	Special envoy	House	Macnamara	(Victoria (state)); Victoria	Right	2019–present	
Mark Butler	Mark Butler (born 1970)	Cabinet	House	Hindmarsh	South Australia	Left	2007–present	
Alison Byrnes	Alison Byrnes (born 1974)	Backbench	House	Cunningham	New South Wales	Right	2022–present	
	Julie-Ann Campbell (born 1986)	Backbench	House	Moreton	Queensland	Left	2025–present	
Jim Chalmers	Jim Chalmers (born 1978)	Cabinet	House	Rankin	Queensland	Right	2013–present	
Andrew Charlton	Andrew Charlton (born 1978)	Assistant ministry	House	Parramatta	New South Wales	Right	2022–present	
Lisa Chesters	Lisa Chesters (born 1980)	Backbench	House	Bendigo	(Victoria (state)); Victoria	Left	2013–present	
Sen. Chisholm	Anthony Chisholm (born 1978)	Assistant ministry	Senate	Senator for Queensland	Queensland	Right	2016–present	
Sen. Raff	Raff Ciccone (born 1983)	Backbench	Senate	Senator for Victoria	(Victoria (state)); Victoria	Right	2019–present	
Jason Clare	Jason Clare (born 1972)	Cabinet	House	Blaxland	New South Wales	Right	2007–present	
	Sharon Claydon (born 1964)	Deputy Speaker	House	Newcastle	New South Wales	Left	2013–present	
	Claire Clutterham (born 1982)	Backbench	House	Sturt	South Australia	Right	2025–present	
	Renee Coffey (born 1982)	Backbench	House	Griffith	Queensland	Left	2025–present	
Libby Coker	Libby Coker (born 1962)	Backbench	House	Corangamite	(Victoria (state)); Victoria	Left	2019–present	
Julie Collins	Julie Collins (born 1971)	Cabinet	House	Franklin	Tasmania	Left	2007–present	
	Emma Comer (born 1994)	Backbench	House	Petrie	Queensland	Right	2025–present	
Pat Conroy	Pat Conroy (born 1979)	Cabinet	House	Shortland	New South Wales	Right	2013–present	
	Kara Cook (born 1985)	Backbench	House	Bonner	Queensland	Left	2025–present	
	Trish Cook (born 1964)	Backbench	House	Bullwinkel	Western Australia	Left	2025–present	
Sen. Cox	Dorinda Cox (born 1976)	Backbench	Senate	Senator for Western Australia	Western Australia	Left	2021–present (Note: Cox filled a casual vacancy for the senate as a member of the Australian Greens in 2021 and was re-elected in 2022. She resigned from the Greens and joined the Labor Party in June 2025)	
Labor Party image placeholder	Lisa Darmanin	Senate Whip	Senate	Senator for Victoria	(Victoria (state)); Victoria	Left	2024–present	
Milton Dick	Milton Dick (born 1972)	House Speaker	House	Oxley	Queensland	Right	2016–present (Note: Dick was elected Speaker of the Australian House of Representatives on 26 July 2022, and re-elected in 2025. Although still a member of the Labor Caucus, Dick has chosen to comply with longstanding Australian parliamentary convention and not attend caucus meetings while serving as Speaker.)	
Labor Party image placeholder	Josh Dolega (born 1983)	Backbench	Senate	Senator for Tasmania	Tasmania	Left	2025–present	
Labor Party image placeholder	Richard Dowling (born 1983)	Backbench	Senate	Senator for Tasmania	Tasmania	Right	2025–present	
	Mary Doyle (born 1970)	Backbench	House	Aston	(Victoria (state)); Victoria	Left	2023–present	
Mark Dreyfus	Mark Dreyfus (born 1956)	Special envoy	House	Isaacs	(Victoria (state)); Victoria	Right	2007–present	
Justine Elliot	Justine Elliot (born 1967)	Backbench	House	Richmond	New South Wales	Right	2004–present	
Sen. Farrell	Don Farrell (born 1954)	Cabinet	Senate	Senator for South Australia	South Australia	Right	2008–2014; 2016–present	
Cassandra Fernando	Cassandra Fernando (born 1987)	Backbench	House	Holt	(Victoria (state)); Victoria	Right	2022–present	
	Ali France (born 1973)	Backbench	House	Dickson	Queensland	Left	2025–present	
	Mike Freelander (born 1953)	Backbench	House	Macarthur	New South Wales	Right	2016–present	
	Tom French (born 1983)	Backbench	House	Moore	Western Australia	Left	2025–present	
Sen. Gallagher	Katy Gallagher (born 1970)	Cabinet	Senate	Senator for the Australian Capital Territory	Australian Capital Territory	Left	2015–2018; 2019–present	
Carina Garland	Carina Garland (born 1982)	Backbench	House	Chisholm	(Victoria (state)); Victoria	Left	2022–present	
Steve Georganas	Steve Georganas (born 1959)	Backbench	House	Adelaide	South Australia	Right	2004–2013; 2016–present	
Labor Party image placeholder	Varun Ghosh (born 1985)	Backbench	Senate	Senator for Western Australia	Western Australia	Right	2024–present	
Andrew Giles	Andrew Giles (born 1973)	Outer ministry	House	Scullin	(Victoria (state)); Victoria	Left	2013–present	
	Patrick Gorman (born 1984)	Assistant ministry	House	Perth	Western Australia	Left	2018–present	
Luke Gosling	Luke Gosling (born 1971)	Special envoy	House	Solomon	Northern Territory	Right	2016–present	
	Nita Green (born 1983)	Assistant ministry	Senate	Senator for Queensland	Queensland	Left	2019–present	
	Matt Gregg (born ?)	Backbench	House	Deakin	(Victoria (state)); Victoria	Right	2025–present	
Sen. Grogan	Karen Grogan (born 1967)	Senate Whip	Senate	Senator for South Australia	South Australia	Left	2021–present	
Julian Hill	Julian Hill (born 1973)	Assistant ministry	House	Bruce	(Victoria (state)); Victoria	Left	2016–present	
	Rowan Holzberger (born 1973)	Backbench	House	Forde	Queensland	Left	2025–present	
	Ed Husic (born 1970)	Backbench	House	Chifley	New South Wales	Right	2010–present	
	Madonna Jarrett (born 1966)	Backbench	House	Brisbane	Queensland	Left	2025–present	
	Alice Jordan-Baird (born 1993)	Backbench	House	Gorton	(Victoria (state)); Victoria	Right	2025–present	
Ged Kearney	Ged Kearney (born 1963)	Assistant ministry	House	Cooper	(Victoria (state)); Victoria	Left	2018–present	
Matt Keogh	Matt Keogh (born 1981)	Outer ministry	House	Burt	Western Australia	Right	2016–present	
	Peter Khalil (born 1973)	Assistant ministry	House	Wills	(Victoria (state)); Victoria	Right	2016–present	
Catherine King	Catherine King (born 1966)	Cabinet	House	Ballarat	(Victoria (state)); Victoria	Left	2001–present	
Madeleine King	Madeleine King (born 1973)	Cabinet	House	Brand	Western Australia	Right	2016–present	
	Tania Lawrence (born 1973)	Backbench	House	Hasluck	Western Australia	Right	2022–present	
Jerome Laxale	Jerome Laxale (born 1983)	Backbench	House	Bennelong	New South Wales	Left	2022–present	
Andrew Leigh	Andrew Leigh (born 1972)	Assistant ministry	House	Fenner	Australian Capital Territory	Unaligned	2010–present	
	Sam Lim (born 1961)	Backbench	House	Tangney	Western Australia	Right	2022–present	
Sen. Lines	Sue Lines (born 1953)	Senate president	Senate	Senator for Western Australia	Western Australia	Left	2013–present	
Richard Marles	Richard Marles (born 1967)	Cabinet	House	Corio	(Victoria (state)); Victoria	Right	2007–present	
	Zaneta Mascarenhas (born 1980)	Backbench	House	Swan	Western Australia	Left	2022–present	
Sen. McAllister	Jenny McAllister (born 1973)	Outer ministry	Senate	Senator for New South Wales	New South Wales	Left	2015–present	
Kristy McBain	Kristy McBain (born 1982)	Outer ministry	House	Eden-Monaro	New South Wales	Right	2020–present	
Emma McBride	Emma McBride (born 1975)	Assistant ministry	House	Dobell	New South Wales	Right	2016–present	
Sen. McCarthy	Malarndirri McCarthy (born 1970)	Cabinet	Senate	Senator for the Northern Territory	Northern Territory	Left	2016–present	
Louise Miller-Frost	Louise Miller-Frost (born 1967)	Backbench	House	Boothby	South Australia	Left	2022–present	
Rob Mitchell	Rob Mitchell (born 1967)	Backbench	House	McEwen	(Victoria (state)); Victoria	Right	2010–present	
	David Moncrieff (born ?)	Backbench	House	Hughes	New South Wales	Right	2025–present	
	Corinne Mulholland (born 1987)	Backbench	Senate	Senator for Queensland	Queensland	Right	2025–present	
Daniel Mulino	Daniel Mulino (born 1969)	Outer ministry	House	Fraser	(Victoria (state)); Victoria	Right	2019–present	
Shayne Neumann	Shayne Neumann (born 1961)	Backbench	House	Blair	Queensland	Right	2007–present	
	Gabriel Ng (born ?)	Backbench	House	Menzies	(Victoria (state)); Victoria	Left	2025–present	
Sen. O'Neill	Deborah O'Neill (born 1961)	Backbench	Senate	Senator for New South Wales	New South Wales	Right	2013–present (Note: Served as a Member of the Australian House of Representatives for Robertson, 2010–2013)	
Clare O'Neil	Clare O'Neil (born 1980)	Cabinet	House	Hotham	(Victoria (state)); Victoria	Right	2013–present	
	Alicia Payne (born 1982)	Backbench	House	Canberra	Australian Capital Territory	Unaligned	2019–present	
Fiona Philips	Fiona Phillips (born 1970)	Backbench	House	Gilmore	New South Wales	Left	2019–present	
Tanya Plibersek	Tanya Plibersek (born 1969)	Cabinet	House	Sydney	New South Wales	Left	1998–present	
Sen. Polley	Helen Polley (born 1957)	Backbench	Senate	Senator for Tasmania	Tasmania	Right	2005–present	
	Sam Rae (born 1986)	Outer ministry	House	Hawke	(Victoria (state)); Victoria	Right	2022–present	
	Gordon Reid (born 1992)	Backbench	House	Robertson	New South Wales	Right	2022–present	
Dan Repacholi	Dan Repacholi (born 1982)	Special envoy	House	Hunter	New South Wales	Right	2022–present	
Amanda Rishworth	Amanda Rishworth (born 1978)	Cabinet	House	Kingston	South Australia	Right	2007–present	
	Tracey Roberts (born ?)	Backbench	House	Pearce	Western Australia	Right	2022–present	
Michelle Rowland	Michelle Rowland (born 1971)	Cabinet	House	Greenway	New South Wales	Right	2010–present	
Joanne Ryan	Joanne Ryan (born 1961)	Chief House Whip	House	Lalor	(Victoria (state)); Victoria	Left	2013–present	
Marion Scrymgour	Marion Scrymgour (born 1960)	Special envoy	House	Lingiari	Northern Territory	Left	2022–present	
Sen. Sheldon	Tony Sheldon (born 1961)	Chief Senate Whip	Senate	Senator for New South Wales	New South Wales	Right	2019–present	
Sally Sitou	Sally Sitou (born 1982)	Backbench	House	Reid	New South Wales	Right	2022–present	
David Smith	David Smith (born 1970)	House Whip	House	Bean	Australian Capital Territory	Right	2019–present (Note: Served as a Senator for the ACT, 2018–2019)	
	Marielle Smith (born 1986)	Backbench	Senate	Senator for South Australia	South Australia	Right	2019–present	
	Matt Smith (born 1979)	Backbench	House	Leichhardt	Queensland	Left	2025–present	
	Zhi Soon (born 1985)	Backbench	House	Banks	New South Wales	Left	2025–present	
Anne Stanley	Anne Stanley (born 1961)	House Whip	House	Werriwa	New South Wales	Left	2016–present	
Sen. Sterle	Glenn Sterle (born 1960)	Backbench	Senate	Senator for Western Australia	Western Australia	Right	2005–present	
Sen. Stewart	Jana Stewart (born 1987)	Backbench	Senate	Senator for Victoria	(Victoria (state)); Victoria	Right	2022–present	
Meryl Swanson	Meryl Swanson (born 1970)	Backbench	House	Paterson	New South Wales	Right	2016–present	
	Jess Teesdale (born 1983)	Backbench	House	Bass	Tasmania	Left	2025–present	
	Susan Templeman (born 1963)	Special envoy	House	Macquarie	New South Wales	Left	2016–present	
Matt Thistlethwaite	Matt Thistlethwaite (born 1972)	Assistant ministry	House	Kingsford Smith	New South Wales	Right	2013–present (Note: Served as Senator for New South Wales, 2011–2013)	
	Kate Thwaites (born 1980)	Special envoy	House	Jagajaga	(Victoria (state)); Victoria	Left	2019–present	
	Tammy Tyrrell (born 1970)	Backbench	Senate	Senator for Tasmania	Tasmania	Right	2022–present (Note: Member of the Jacqui Lambie Network from her election until 2022, sat as an independent from 2024 until joining the Labor Party in 2026)	
	Anne Urquhart (born 1957)	Backbench	House	Braddon	Tasmania	Left	2025–present (Note: Served as a Senator for Tasmania, 2011–2025)	
Sen. Walker	Charlotte Walker (born 2004)	Backbench	Senate	Senator for South Australia	South Australia	Left	2025–present	
Sen. Walsh	Jess Walsh (born 1971)	Outer ministry	Senate	Senator for Victoria	(Victoria (state)); Victoria	Left	2019–present	
Sen. Watt	Murray Watt (born 1973)	Cabinet	Senate	Senator for Queensland	Queensland	Left	2016–present	
Tim Watts	Tim Watts (born 1982)	Special envoy	House	Gellibrand	(Victoria (state)); Victoria	Right	2013–present	
Anika Wells	Anika Wells (born 1985)	Cabinet	House	Lilley	Queensland	Right	2019–present	
	Rebecca White (born 1983)	Assistant ministry	House	Lyons	Tasmania	Left	2025–present	
Sen. Whiteaker	Ellie Whiteaker	Backbench	Senate	Senator for Western Australia	Western Australia	Left	2025–present	
Josh Wilson	Josh Wilson (born 1972)	Assistant ministry	House	Fremantle	Western Australia	Left	2016–2018; 2018–present	
	Sarah Witty (born 1972)	Backbench	House	Melbourne	(Victoria (state)); Victoria	Left	2025–present	
Sen. Wong	Penny Wong (born 1968)	Cabinet	Senate	Senator for South Australia	South Australia	Left	2002–present	
Tony Zappia	Tony Zappia (born 1952)	Backbench	House	Makin	South Australia	Left	2007–present	

== Party factions ==
Parliamentary caucus seats by chamber
- House of Representatives: 94 / 124
- Senate: 30 / 124

Parliamentary caucus seats by gender
- Female: 70 / 124
- Male: 54 / 124

Parliamentary caucus seats by faction
- Labor Left: 61 / 124
- Labor Right: 61 / 124
- Unaligned: 2 / 124

Parliamentary caucus seats by state/territory
- Victoria: 32 / 124
- New South Wales: 32 / 124
- Queensland: 16 / 124
- Western Australia: 16 / 124
- South Australia: 12 / 124
- Tasmania: 9 / 124
- Australian Capital Territory: 4 / 124
- Northern Territory: 3 / 124

The Caucus is divided along formal factional lines, with most voting taking place on a bloc factional basis, especially in the case of appointments, and may involve cross-factional deals. The two biggest factions are the Labor Right and the Labor Left. Each of these factions contains smaller state-based factions, such as (on the Right) the Victorian Labor Unity group and (on the Left) the Victorian Socialist Left. Members who are not associated with either faction are described as Independents. The two main factions hold factional meetings once a week during Parliamentary sitting weeks.

Factional allegiances in the Caucus tend to be closely related to state political loyalties, and also to trade union affiliations. Large unions such as the Australian Workers' Union, the Australian Manufacturing Workers Union and the Shop, Distributive and Allied Employees Association, regard as "theirs" Members and Senators who formerly held office in those unions, or who have received union support in gaining their preselections, and expect them to act in the union's interests.

== Caucus committees ==
The federal caucus has a number of policy-focused committees designed to stimulate debate among caucus members, minimise complacency and ensure federal policy development continues throughout each parliamentary term. The committees are centred around policy areas that roughly align with ministerial portfolios, with some grouped together, and include:

- Education, Employment, Workplace Relations and the Arts Caucus Committee
- Living Standards and Economic Development Caucus Committee
- Multicultural Policy Caucus Committee
- Social Policy Caucus Committee
- Economics Policy Caucus Committee
- Women's Caucus Committee
- Sustainable Australia Caucus Committee
- First Nations Caucus Committee
- International and Legal Affairs Caucus Committee
- Country Caucus Committee

== Gallery ==
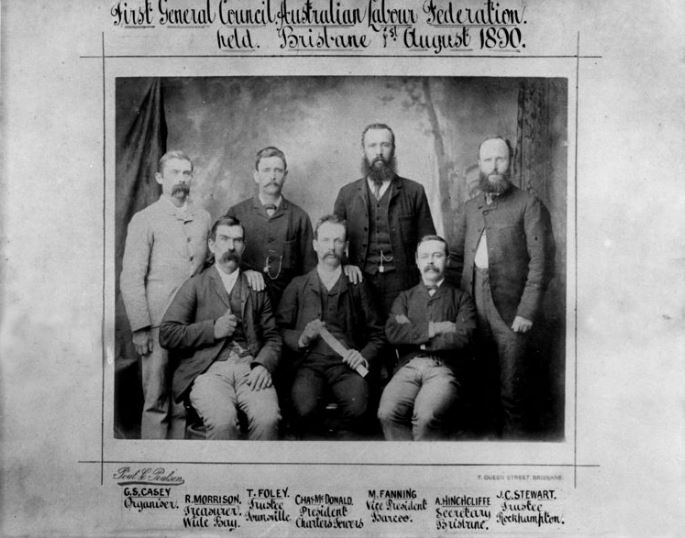
First General Council of the Australian Labour Federation, Brisbane, 1 August 1890

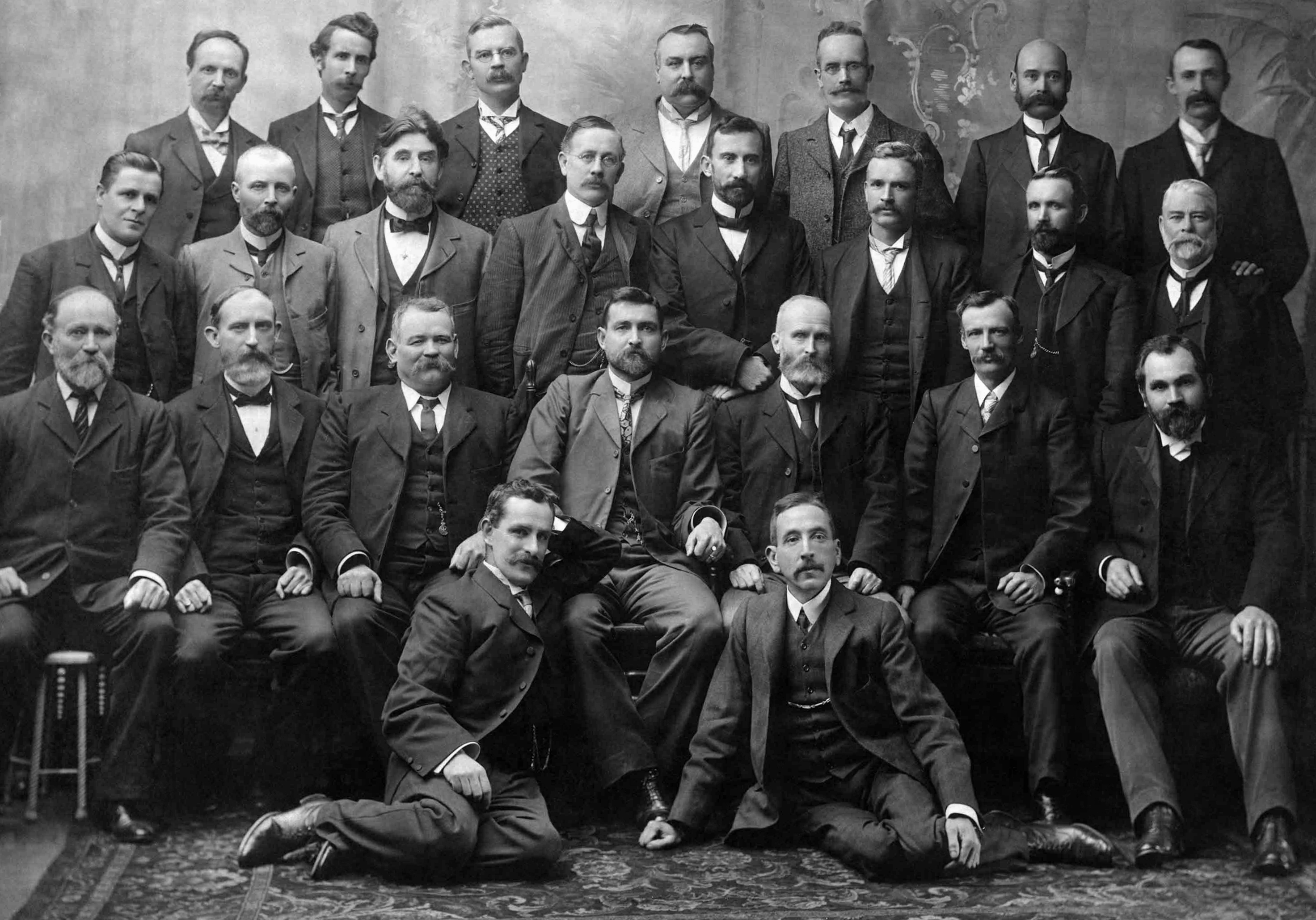
Federal Labour Party MPs elected to the Australian House of Representatives and Australian Senate at the inaugural 1901 election

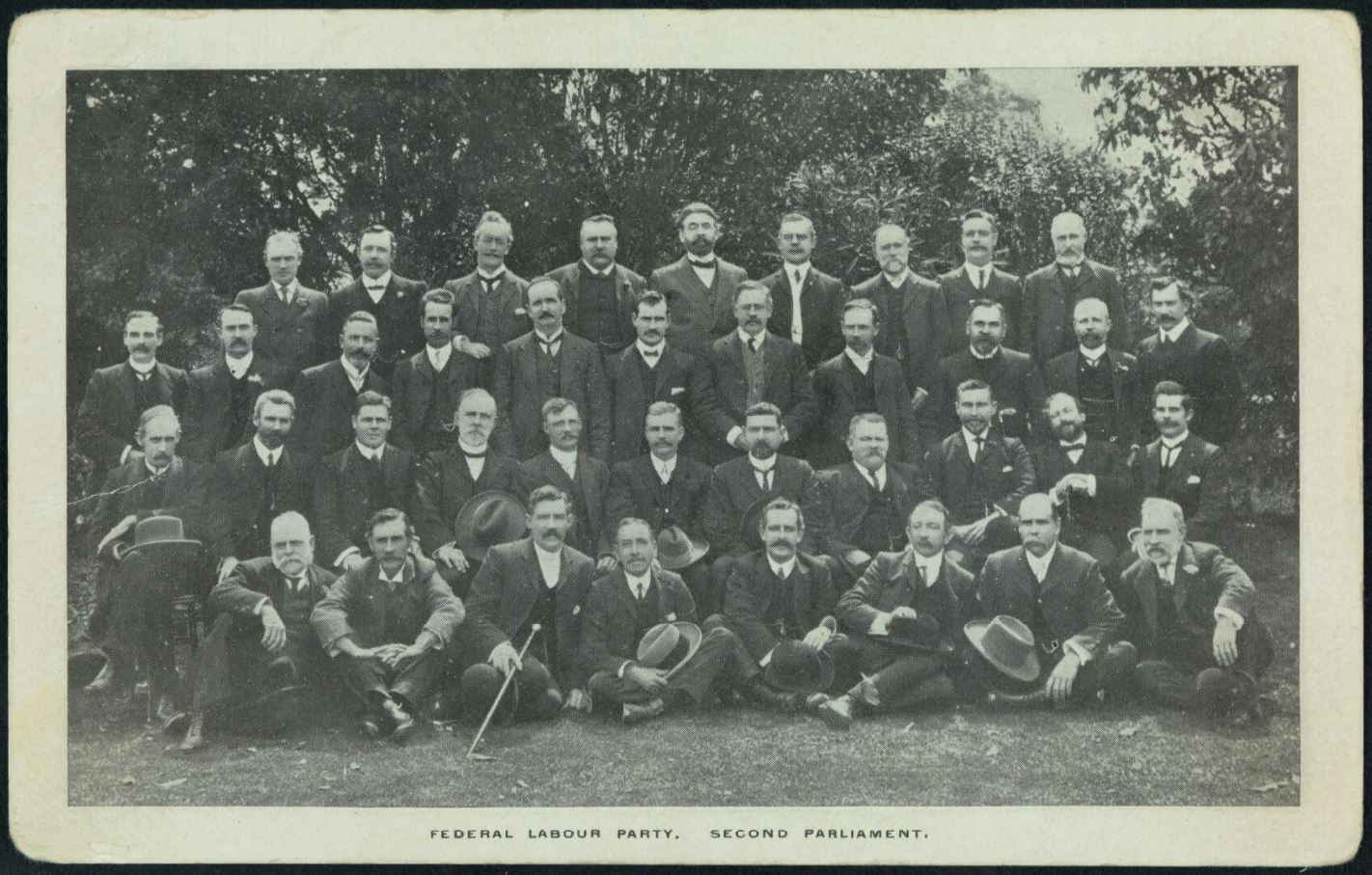
Federal Labour Party, Federal City Camp site, Canberra, 1909

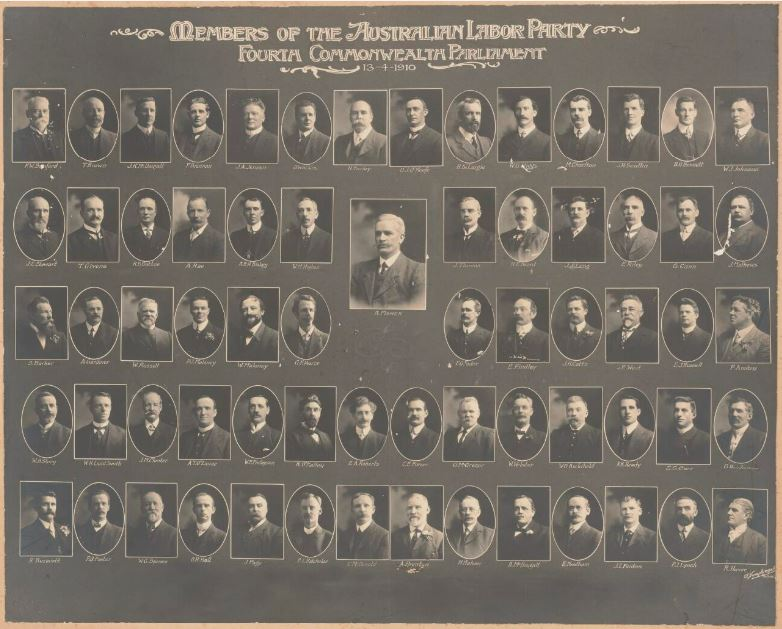
Members of the Australian Labor Party, Fourth Commonwealth Parliament, 13 April 1910

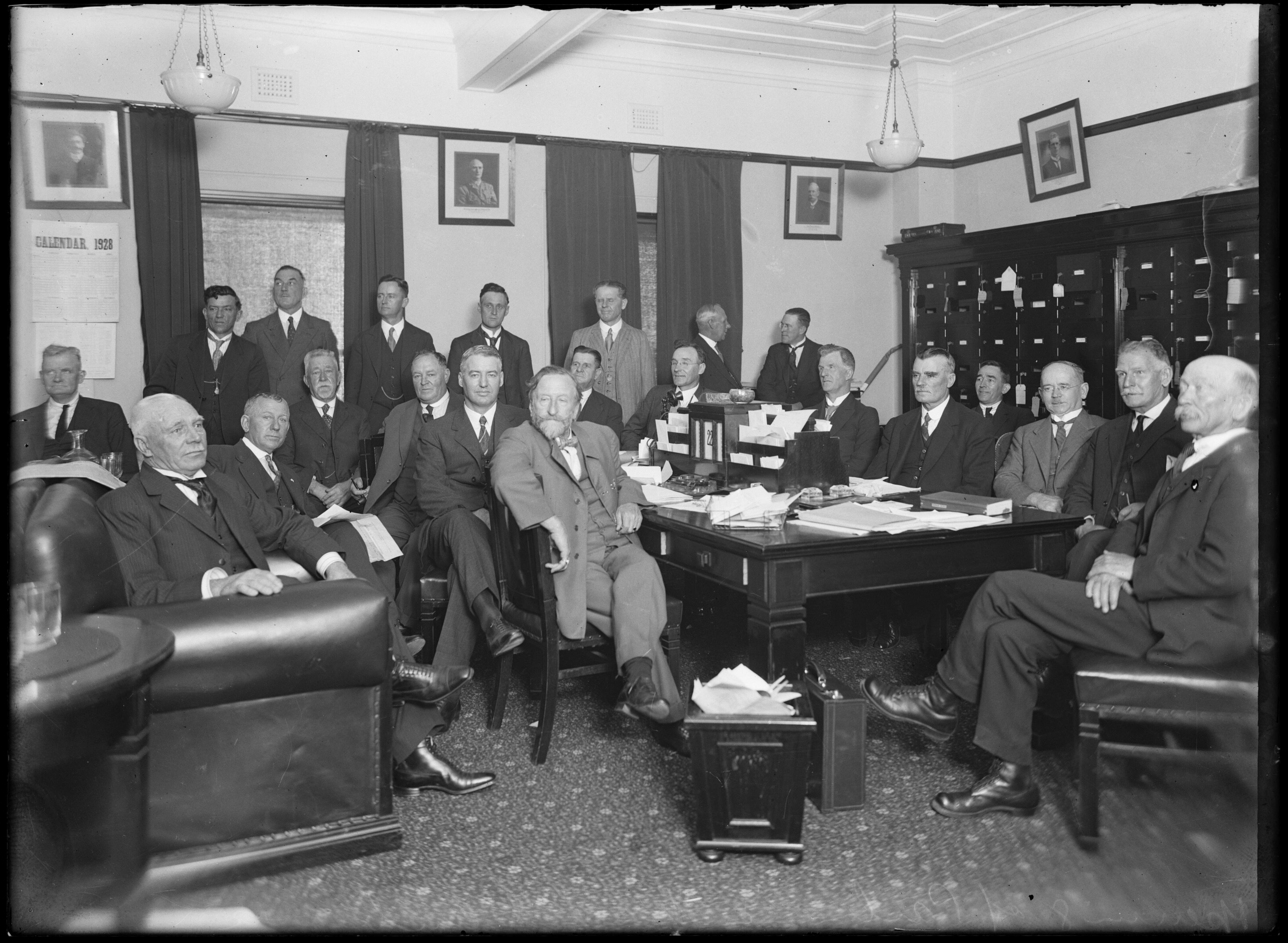
Members of the Australian Labor Party Caucus at Parliament House in February 1928

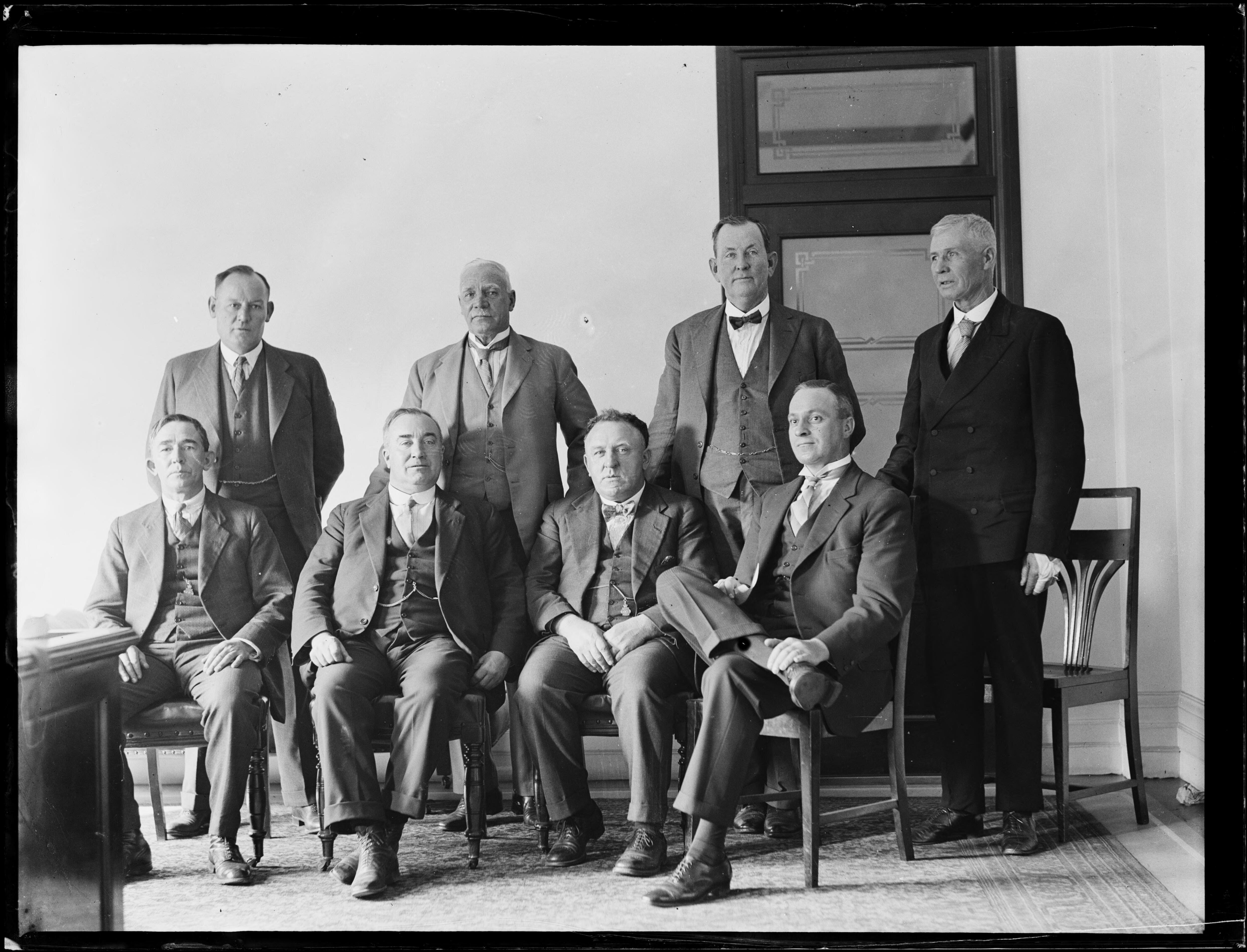
Australian Labor Party federal MPs from New South Wales, 1930

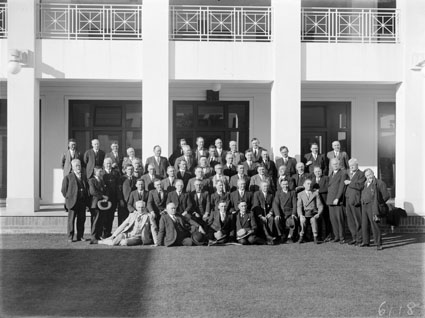
Labor MPs and Senators of the Scullin government, 1929

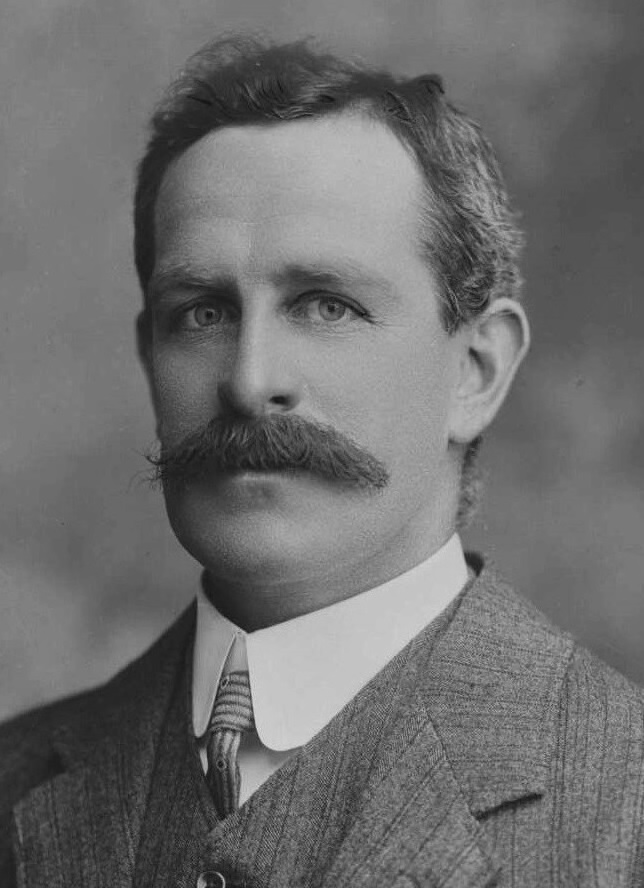
Frank Tudor, Labor's first House whip (1901–1908), and the party's sixth leader (1916–1922)

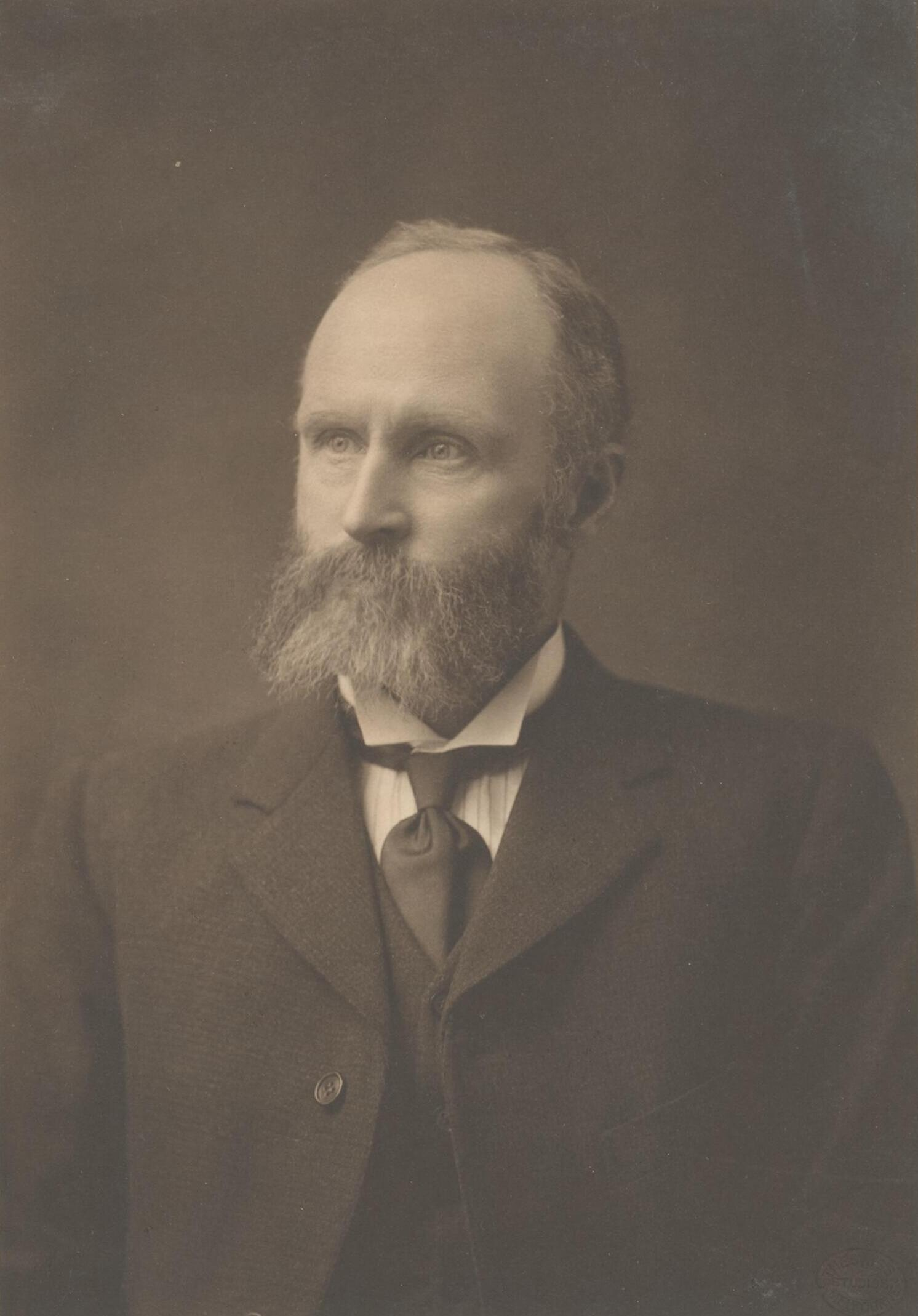
James Stewart, Labor's first Senate whip (1901–03)

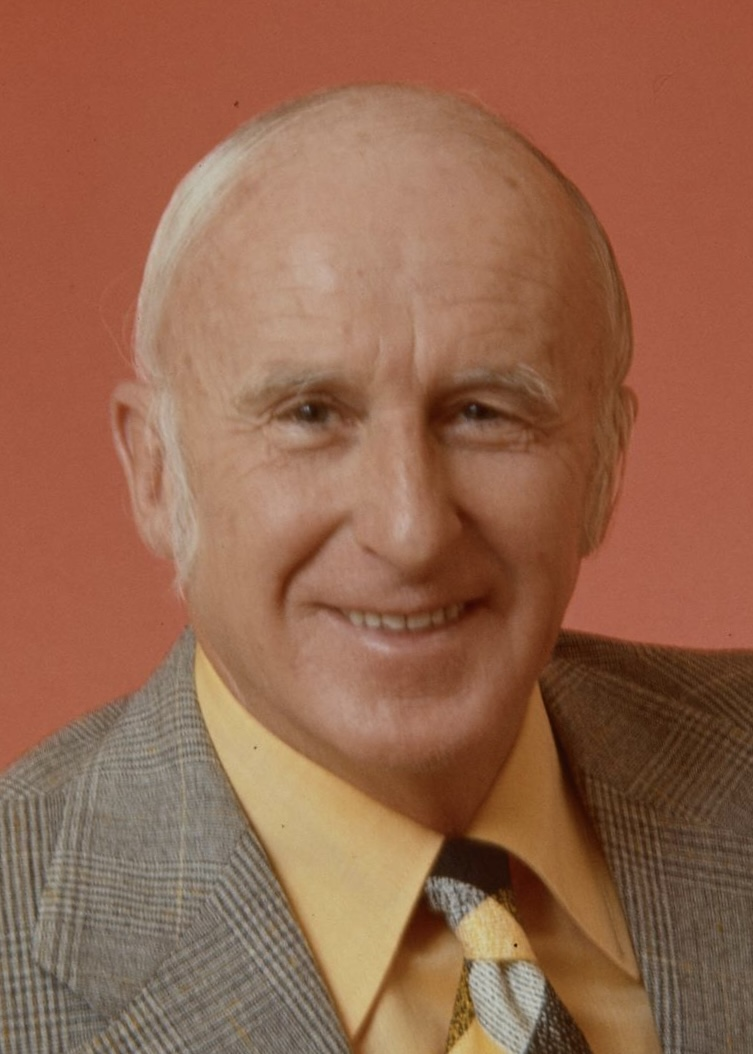
Gil Duthie was the longest-serving Chief Labor Party Whip in the House, serving for 16 years from 1956 to 1972

== See also ==
- List of whips in the Australian Senate
- List of whips in the Australian House of Representatives
- Members of the Australian Senate, 2025–2028
- Members of the Australian House of Representatives, 2025-2028
- Gang of Four (Australian Labor Party)
- Cabinet of Australia

== Bibliography ==
- "Who's Who in the Factional Zoo," a table appearing on page 415-416 of The Latham Diaries by Mark Latham.
