= Gang of Four (Australian Labor Party) =

Former Australian political grouping

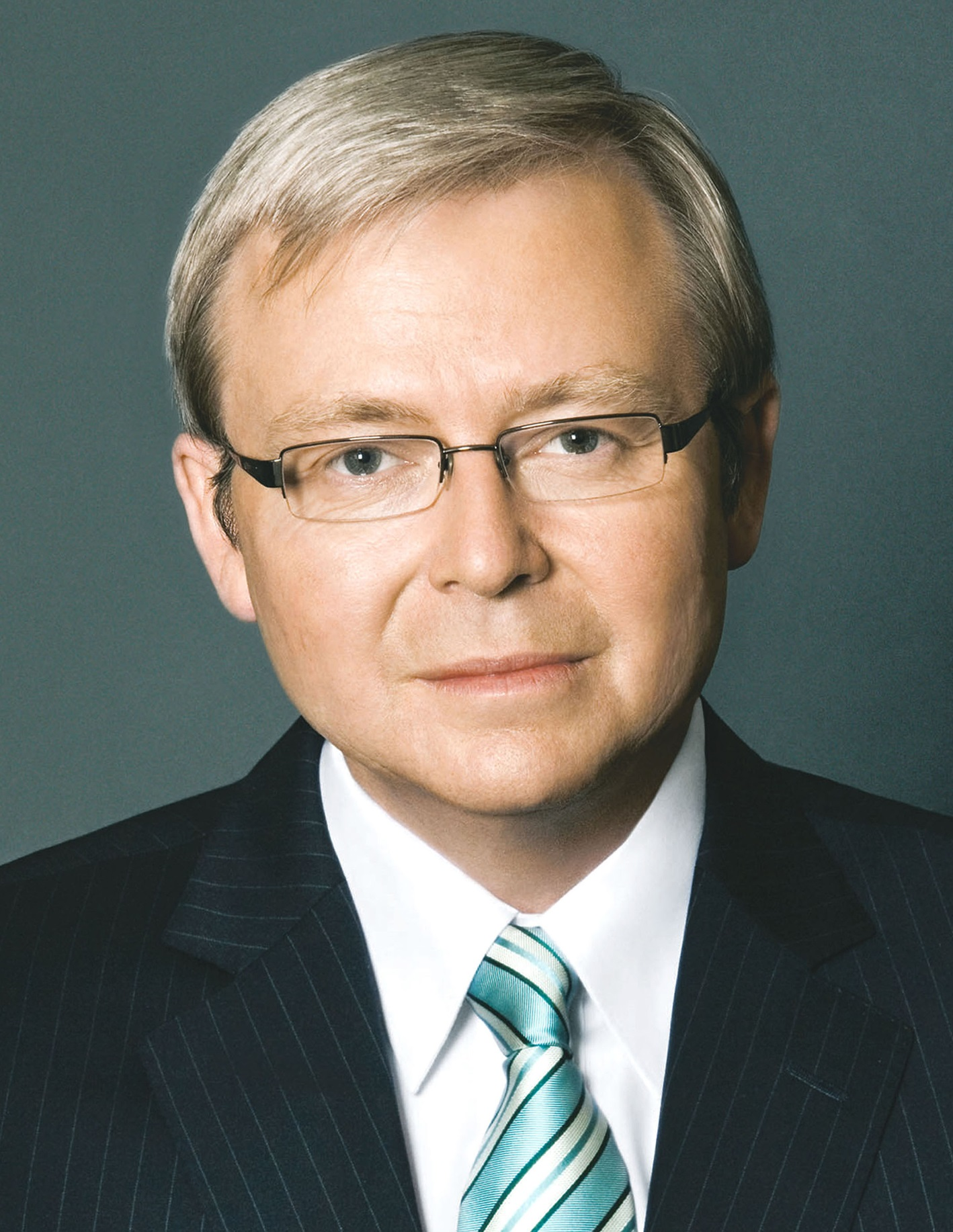
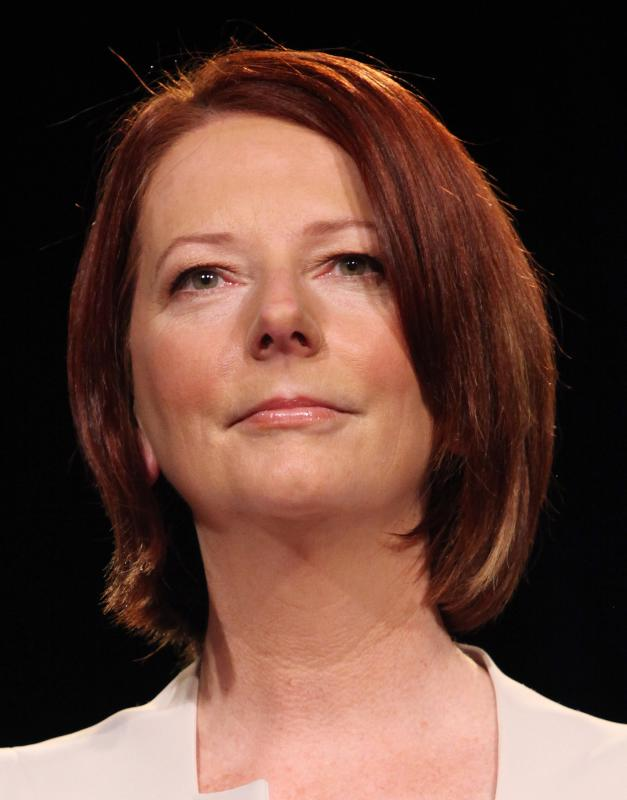
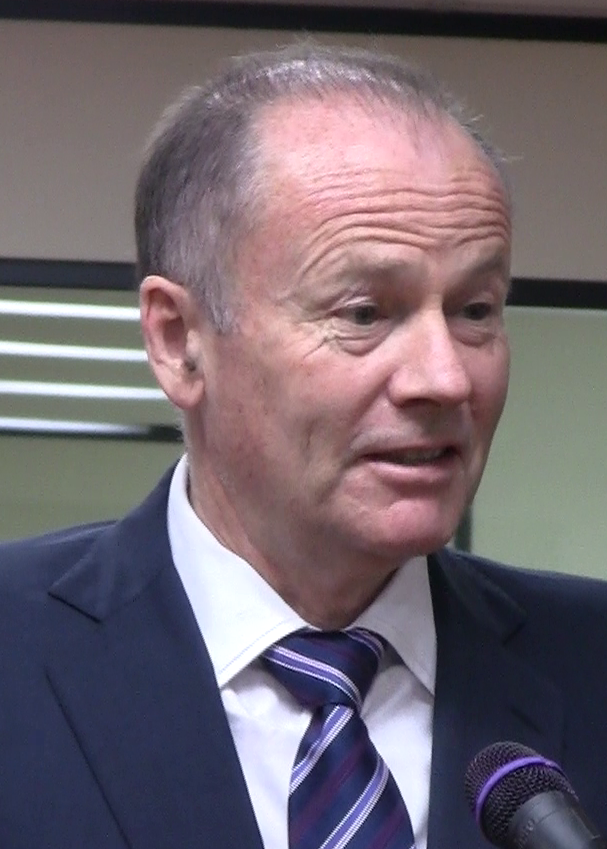
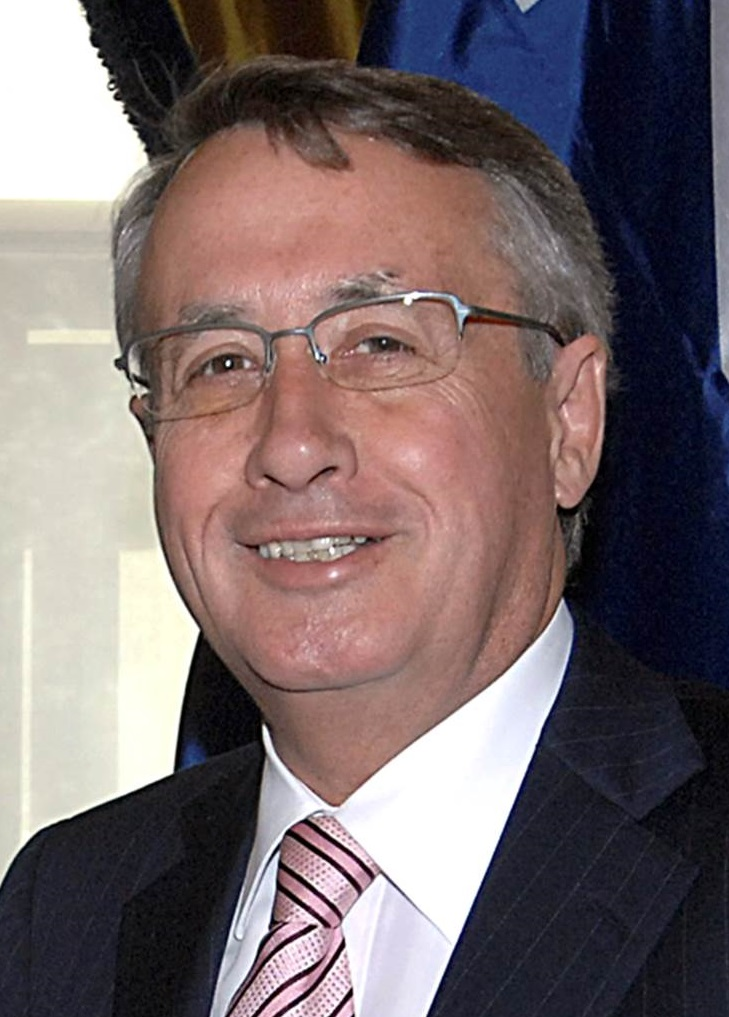
Members of the Gang of Four. Clockwise from upper left: Kevin Rudd, Julia Gillard, Wayne Swan, and Lindsay Tanner.

The Strategic Priorities Budget Committee (SPBC), better known as the Gang of Four, was a political strategic grouping within the Australian Labor Party, comprising then-Prime Minister Kevin Rudd, Deputy Prime Minister Julia Gillard (Note: Along with holding the positions of Deputy Leader of the Labor Party, Minister for Education, Minister for Employment and Workplace Relations, and Minister for Social Inclusion), Treasurer Wayne Swan and Finance Minister Lindsay Tanner. This name refers to the tightly held concentration of political power between the group throughout the First Rudd government (2007–10), which deliberated on various political issues concerning the 2008 financial crisis to the Carbon Pollution Reduction Scheme.

== Aftermath ==
Among the Gang of Four, Kevin Rudd and Julia Gillard's careers were intertwined most. Due to the declining poll numbers and the dissatisfaction with Rudd's leadership before the 2010 Federal Election, enough Labor Caucus members stopped supporting Rudd as prime minister and switched their support to Gillard. Instead of standing in the leadership spill, Rudd resigned and Gillard became the new prime minister without any opposition.

In the election, Labor lost its majority government but with the support of one Greens MP and three independent MPs, it formed a minority government. Although Gillard appointed Rudd as Minister for Foreign Affairs in September 2010, Gillard and Rudd became political rivals. In February 2012, Rudd resigned from the Foreign Ministry and lost the leadership spill against Gillard. Despite her win, Labor continued to decline in the polls. In March 2013, former Labor Leader, Regional Minister, and ally of Gillard, Simon Crean switched his support for Rudd. In response, Gillard called for a new leadership spill. However, Rudd didn't become a candidate, citing the lack of an "overwhelming majority" requesting his return and Gillard won the spill unopposed. After the spill, Gillard sacked Crean from the Cabinet.

In June 2013, most of the Labor Caucus was convinced that Gillard would lose the upcoming elections. Rudd emerged as the only alternative in the leadership spill and defeated Gillard. Before the spill, Gillard pledged that she would retire from politics if she lost the vote. After her loss, she kept her promise and announced her retirement. Rudd steered the Labor Party in the 2013 Federal Election but was defeated by the Coalition. After the election defeat, Rudd resigned from the leadership and parliament seat.

In the 2010 leadership spill, Wayne Swan was also elected as the Deputy Leader seat that was vacated by Gillard. He was also appointed as the Deputy Prime Minister. Swan continued to hold his Treasurer position until Labor lost power in 2013. In June 2018, he was elected national president of the ALP and retired from the parliament in 2019.

Lindsay Tanner announced his retirement in the 2010 elections to spend more time at home with his family. He announced that he had made this decision before the leadership change.
