= Robert S. Leiken =

American political scientist and historian

- Born: March 19, 1939; New York City, New York
- Died: June 7, 2017 (aged 78); Boston, Massachusetts, U.S.
- Education: B.A. in English from Harvard University; M.A. in History from Harvard University; Ph.D. in Politics from Oxford University
- Occupations: Think tank, Intellectual, Author

Robert Solin Leiken (March 19, 1939 – June 7, 2017) was an American intellectual, political scientist, and historian who worked at several U.S. universities and policy centers.

== Early life ==
Leiken was born in New York City in 1939. Leiken grew up in Great Neck, New York, where he attended public school through the tenth grade. He graduated from the Deerfield Academy.

== Education ==
Leiken earned a B.A. from Harvard University in English, in 1961, completing a thesis on Henry James. He went on to receive an M.A. from Harvard in history, in 1964. He attended Oxford University in 1961-1962, and later completed a doctorate in politics there, at St Antony's College. In 2003 he was awarded the Bosch Berlin Prize in Public Policy by the American Academy in Berlin. Leiken was fluent in Spanish. He also studied French, German, Classical Greek and Latin.

== University teaching ==
After receiving his M.A. from Harvard, Leiken served as an Acting Assistant Professor of Humanities at Massachusetts Institute of Technology from 1968–1971. In 1971 he went to Mexico, where he served as a Professor of Economics at the National Agricultural University of Mexico (Universidad Nacional Agricola Autonoma de Chapingo) and also as a Professor of Economic History at the Center for Economic Research and Teaching. He also served as a Visiting Professor of Political Science at Boston College and as a Visiting Professor of Communications at Boston University.

== Community organizing ==
=== Mexico ===
In 1971 Leiken left the United States for Mexico, where he stayed until 1975 and returned from 1977–1980. In Cuernavaca he taught English at a labor union center called CEFESOM and political economy at a research university CIDOC.

=== Boston ===
Leiken returned to Boston in 1975. Between 1975 and 1977 Leiken worked as a community organizer, helping to integrate blacks and whites in Dorchester neighborhoods.

== Policy and research centers ==
Upon returning to the United States in 1980, Leiken became a Senior Fellow at the Georgetown Center for Strategic and International Studies. Since then, he has served as a Senior Associate at the Carnegie Endowment for International Peace, a research associate at the Harvard University Center for International Affairs, a visiting fellow at the International Forum for Democratic Studies, a Senior Fellow at the Brookings Institution, and The Center for the National Interest. The wide ideological variety of these organizations is emblematic of Leiken's effort to resist the tendency in Washington to derive policy from politics rather than investigation and has earned a reputation for patient, concrete and unbiased analysis.

== Nicaragua ==
Leiken's October 1984 article in The New Republic entitled "Nicaragua's Untold Stories" criticized the Sandinistas for mismanagement, corruption, and human rights abuses, and political indoctrination. A 1986 profile in The National Journal wrote

The turning point came in the fall of 1984, when, after an intense 10 day trip to Nicaragua, Leiken returned "appalled and angry" over conditions there. He wrote an article criticizing the Sandinistas in terms that were, for a liberal Democrat, unmistakably powerful and all the more striking because they appeared in the traditionally liberal The New Republic, which itself was undergoing something of a political reorientation to a more centrist line.

Leiken's article caused controversy among both Democrats and Republicans, according to Time Magazine:

The idea that a well respected liberal analyst would launch such a strong attack on the Sandinistas caused considerable stir in Washington. Leiken's apparent conversion was seen by the entrenched left as a betrayal and by Reaganites as a vindication of their long held views. Most important, many Democrats who had relied on Leiken's analyses began to reconsider their Sandinista sympathies. Senator Edward Kennedy had the article read into the Congressional Record. Suddenly, Leiken became as controversial as Nicaragua itself.

Diana West of the Washington Times added:

...soon after returning from a trip to Nicaragua in 1984 that fundamentally altered his thinking—an intellectual evolution to which President Reagan referred in yesterday's address on aid to the Nicaraguan resistance—Mr. Leiken became almost as controversial as the wartorn country itself. There were jeers and cheers to be heard on the left and the right. 'Sellout,' snarled some, 'He's seen the light,'" exulted others. But perhaps the greatest impact of Mr. Leiken's change of heart and mind was felt somewhere in the middle those who had come to rely on his scholarship and who now felt moved to reexamine their Sandinista sympathies.

He was also acclaimed for an op-ed in the New York Times ("The Sandinistas Might Lose...", February 12, 1990) on the eve of the first free elections in Nicaragua for correctly predicting the Sandinistas' stunning loss.

Leiken's account of the Sandinistas and of the Contras made him a target of former leftist colleagues. He was to experience similar attacks later from conservatives upon the publication of his 2005 Foreign Affairs article, "The Moderate Muslim Brotherhood". The article argued that Al Qaeda and the Muslim Brotherhood are bitter enemies, and that the Brotherhood's "relative moderation offers Washington a notable opportunity for engagement—as long as policymakers recognize the considerable variation between the group's different branches and tendencies."

== Clinton Administration ==
Leiken served as the Executive Director of the Presidential Commission on Broadcasting to Cuba under President Bill Clinton.

== Later life ==
Leiken's later work focused on jihadis, European Muslim immigration, Mexico, and immigration. Leiken's last book, Europe's Angry Muslims, was published in January 2012, by Oxford University Press. It received an enthusiastic review in the cover story of the May 24, 2012 New Republic and strongly favorable reviews in The Economist, the Christian Science Monitor, The New Statesman and The Evening Standard and elsewhere. Around the time of his death, he was working on a memoir (entitled 'How I Lost All My Friends)' of his times and thoughts as a labor and clandestine revolutionary organizer in Mexico, a community organizer during Boston's busing crisis of the mid-1970s, a critic of the Sandinistas, and a controversial analyst in Washington.

== Selected bibliography ==
=== Books ===
- Europe's Angry Muslims (2nd Edition). (Oxford University Press, 2015)
- Europe's Angry Muslims. (Oxford University Press, 2012)
- Why Nicaragua Vanished: A Story of Reporters and Revolutionaries. (Rowman and Littlefield, 2003)
- Enchilada Lite: A Post 9-11 Mexican Migration Agreement. (CIS, 2002)
- The Melting Border: Mexico and Mexican Communities in the United States. (CEO, 2000)
- The Central American Crisis Reader. (Summit Books, 1987) (Co-editor, with Barry Rubin)
- A New Moment in the Americas. (Transaction Publishers, 1994) (Editor) (Foreword by Al Gore)
- Central America: Anatomy of Conflict. Pergamon Press, 1984 (Editor)
- Soviet Strategy in Latin America. (Praeger, 1982)

=== Essays ===
- "The Menace in Europe's Midst," Current History, 2009
- "Generation Jihad," Bulletin of the Atomic Scientists, 2007
- "The Moderate Muslim Brotherhood," Foreign Affairs, 2007
- "The Quantitative Analysis of Terrorism," Terrorism and Political Violence, 2006
- "Europe's Angry Muslims," Foreign Affairs, July 2005
- "Fair Game: Al Qaeda's New Soldiers," The New Republic, 2004
- "Europe's Itinerant Imams," The Weekly Standard, 2004.
- "Europe's Immigration Problem, and Ours, Mediterranean Quarterly, 2004. Duke University Press
- "Who is Abu Zarqawi?" The Weekly Standard, 2004
- "The End of the Affair: U.S.-Mexican Relations after September 11," The National Interest, Winter 2002–03
- "An Immigration Bargain," The Boston Globe, 2002
- "With A Friend Like Fox," Foreign Affairs, September/October 2001
- "The Go-Between for Mexico, U.S.," Los Angeles Sunday Times, 2001
- "Mexico: the Crisis Next Door," Commentary, 1998
- "Controlling the Global Corruption Epidemic," Foreign Policy, 1996–97
- "An End to Corruption," Washington Post, 1996
- "The Revision Thing," The New Republic, 1992
- "O their America," The Times Literary Supplement, 1992
- "Pros and Contras," The Washington Post Book World, 1991
- "Old and New Politics in Nicaragua," Journal of Democracy, 1990
- "The Sandinistas Might Lose," The New York Times, 1990
- "Oops," The New Republic, 1990
- "The Making of a Mock Epic," The Times Literary Supplement, 1989 (about Ollie North)
- "The Charmed Circle," Peter Collier and David Horowitz eds. Second Thoughts: Former Radicals Look Back at the Sixties, Lanham Md., (Madison Books), 1989
- "Earthquake in Mexico," The National Interest, 1988/9
- "Nicaragua Cliffhanger," The New Republic, 1987
- "Reform the Contras," The New Republic, 1986
- "Battle For Nicaragua," The New York Review of Books, 1986
- "Tangled Nicaragua," The New York Review of Books, 1985
- "The Report of the President's National Bipartisan Commission on Central America," The Political Science Quarterly, 1985
- "The USSR and Central America," in Joseph Cirincione ed., Central America and the Western Alliance, New York (Holmes & Meier) 1985
- "Fantasies and Facts: The Soviet Union and Nicaragua," Current History,1984
- "Inside the [Cuban] Revolution," The New York Review of Books, 1984
- "Nicaragua's Untold Stories," The New Republic, 1984
- "Reconstructing Central American Policy," Washington Quarterly, 1982
- "Potential Conflict in Central America," William J. Taylor Jr., Ed. The Future of Conflict in 1980s, Lexington (Lexington Books) 1982
- "Soviet, Cuba, and Latin America: Which Western Strategy," Fondation Internationale des Sciences Humaines, November 24, 1982, Paris, France
- "Bitter Wine," The New Republic, 1981
- "Eastern Winds in Latin America," Foreign Policy, 1981

=== Monographs, papers, presentations, and speeches ===
- "Europe's Mujahideen: Where Mass Immigration Meets Global Terrorism", CIS, 2005
- "The Future of Anti-Corruption in Mexico", New Moment, Inc. (www.newmoment.com), 1998
- "USAID Handbook for Fighting Corruption", with Sahr John Kpundeh and Phyllis Dininio, U.S. Agency for International Development, 1998
- "Official Corruption in Latin America: Causes and Controls," Inter-American Development Bank, 1996
- "The Nicaraguan Election: A Test of the News," 2nd prize, Media Studies, Woodrow Wilson International Center for Scholars, January 1992.
- "The Arias Peace Plan," Strategy and Arms Control Seminar", Harvard University Kennedy School of Government, October 21, 1987
- "U.S. Policy Regarding Nicaragua and the Contras," 'Debate with Senator George McGovern, Kent State University, February 4, 1987
- "U.S. Interests in Latin America," Dartmouth Group, Moscow, April 1985
- "Soviet Strategy in Central America" at "The Central American Crisis and the Western Alliance," International Institute for Strategic Studies (London) and the Carnegie Endowment for International Peace, Washington D.C., May 1985
- "The Kissinger Commission on Central America," at conference convened by Colombian President Belisario Betancur and Inter-American Development Bank. Cartagena, Colombia, Nov. 30 – Dec. 1, 1984.
- "U.S. Interests in Central America," Chairman, Stanley Conference, October 6–8, 1983, Arley House, Virginia.
- "U.S. Policy in Central America," presentation at annual meeting of Latin American Studies Association, October 1, 1983, Washington D.C.
- "Soviet and Cuban Policy in the Caribbean Basin," in Donald Schulz and Donald Graham, eds. Revolution and Counterrevolution in Central America and the Caribbean, Boulder (Westview) 1983
- "Soviet Policy in Latin America: 1960–81" American Association for the Advancement of Slavic Studies, October 17, 1982, Washington D.C.
