= Four note group =

In music, four note group patterns, alternately called "four-note digital patterns" or simply "four note patterns", are one of many ways to formulate improvised solos in jazz. "Four-Note Grouping is an improvisation technique that uses major and minor triads along with specific passing notes as a means of generating lines. The concept of Four-Note Groupings lets the lines be more 'out' and stretch the possibility of available notes over a chord due to the structural integrity of the triad-based line."

== Four note group devices ==
- Diatonic scale fragment
- Arpeggio (of current chord, altered harmony or an implied passing chord)
- Chromatic approach note (a note preceding a chord tone or scale tone one semitone above or below)
- Chromatic surround notes (two notes preceding a chord tone one semitone above and below) or enclosures
- Pentatonic scale fragment

== Examples ==
- John Coltrane: "Giant Steps" solo

== See also ==
- Sequence (music)
