= Trotskyism in France =

In France, several organizations identify with Trotskyism (French: Trotskisme). These groups vary in size, with memberships ranging from a few dozen to several thousand activists.

== History ==
=== Beginnings: 1929–1933 ===
In 1929, Leon Trotsky was expelled from the USSR by order of Joseph Stalin. Internationally, those who supported Trotsky's political views and his Left Opposition were expelled from the Communist parties aligned with the Third International, which had come under Stalinist control. These initial "Trotskyists" (a term initially used by their adversaries) organized themselves nationally and internationally despite significant challenges.

In France, under Trotsky’s guidance, the Communist League was founded in April 1930 by Alfred Rosmer, Pierre Naville, Gérard Rosenthal, Pierre Frank, and Raymond Molinier. Its members, all part of the French Communist Party (PCF), operated as a clandestine faction within the party and disseminated their ideas through the journal La Vérité.

=== Trotsky's Exile in France ===
After a stay in Turkey, in July 1933, Trotsky was offered asylum in France by Prime Minister Édouard Daladier. Trotsky accepted the offer, but he was forbidden to live in Paris and soon found himself under the surveillance of the French police. From July 1933 to February 1934, Trotsky and his wife lived in Royan. The philosopher and activist Simone Weil also arranged for Trotsky and his bodyguards to stay for a few days at her parents' house.

Following the 6 February 1934 crisis in France, the French minister of internal affairs, Albert Sarraut, signed a decree to deport Trotsky from France. However, no foreign government was found willing to accept Trotsky within its borders. Accordingly, the French authorities instructed Trotsky to move to a residence in the tiny village of Barbizon under the strict surveillance of the French police, where Trotsky found his contact with the outside world to be even worse than during his exile in Turkey.

In May 1935, soon after the French government had agreed to the Franco-Soviet Treaty of Mutual Assistance with the Soviet Union government, Trotsky was officially told that he was no longer welcome in France. After weighing his options, Trotsky applied to move to Norway.

=== French Turn ===
By 1934, the French Trotskyists numbered fewer than forty members. Following Trotsky’s advice, under what was known as the French Turn, they joined the French Section of the Workers' International (SFIO) to influence the party's political direction, particularly after the SFIO adopted a united front strategy with the Communist Party. However, this effort ended when the SFIO adopted the Popular Front strategy at its 1935 Mulhouse Congress, leading to the expulsion of the Trotskyists.

=== Pre War ===
Subsequent years saw internal divisions and the creation of several groups:

- Party of Revolutionary Workers (POR) led by Naville and Rosenthal.
- Revolutionary Action Groups (GAR), founded by Molinier and Frank.
- Jeunesses socialistes révolutionnaires (JSR), created by Yvan Craipeau, Fred Zeller, and others.

By 1938, the French Trotskyists unified into the Internationalist Workers' Party (POI), which represented the French section of the newly established Fourth International. Internal schisms, however, persisted.

=== World War II: 1940–1945 ===
During World War II, French Trotskyists faced difficult choices: whether to engage in resistance or entryism into collaborationist movements to conduct propaganda among German soldiers. Notable figures like David Rousset endured Nazi deportation and later documented the concentration camp experience.

The war also saw Trotskyist activities in the Free French and clandestine efforts. These years were marked by the assassination of Trotsky in 1940, leaving the Fourth International in disarray.

=== Postwar Period: 1945–1968 ===
The postwar years saw the unification of French Trotskyists into the Internationalist Communist Party (PCI), which became the French section of the Fourth International, though this unity was short-lived due to internal ideological divisions. By 1952, a major split occurred between the Pabloist and Lambertist factions, reflecting broader international divisions within the Fourth International which removed its Central Committee. It split again when in 1953, the Fourth International itself divided.

During the Algerian War of Independence, French Trotskyists played an active role. The Pabloists supported the FLN, providing material aid and political advocacy. Conversely, the Lambertists aligned with the MNA.

In 1967, the rump of the PCI renamed itself the "Internationalist Communist Organisation" (Organisation Communiste Internationaliste, OCI).

=== May 1968 ===
The events of May 1968 revitalized Trotskyist movements in France, with the emergence of the Revolutionary Communist League (LCR) and the growth of Lutte Ouvrière (LO). These groups, along with other smaller factions, gained electoral and political visibility in the decades following.

They were banned alongside other far-left groups, such as the Gauche prolétarienne (Proletarian Left). Members temporarily reconstituted the group as the Trotskyist Organisation but soon obtained a state order permitting the reformation of the OCI. By 1970, the OCI was able to organise a 10,000-strong youth rally. The group also gained a strong base in trade unions. However, further splits and disintegration followed.

=== 2000s ===
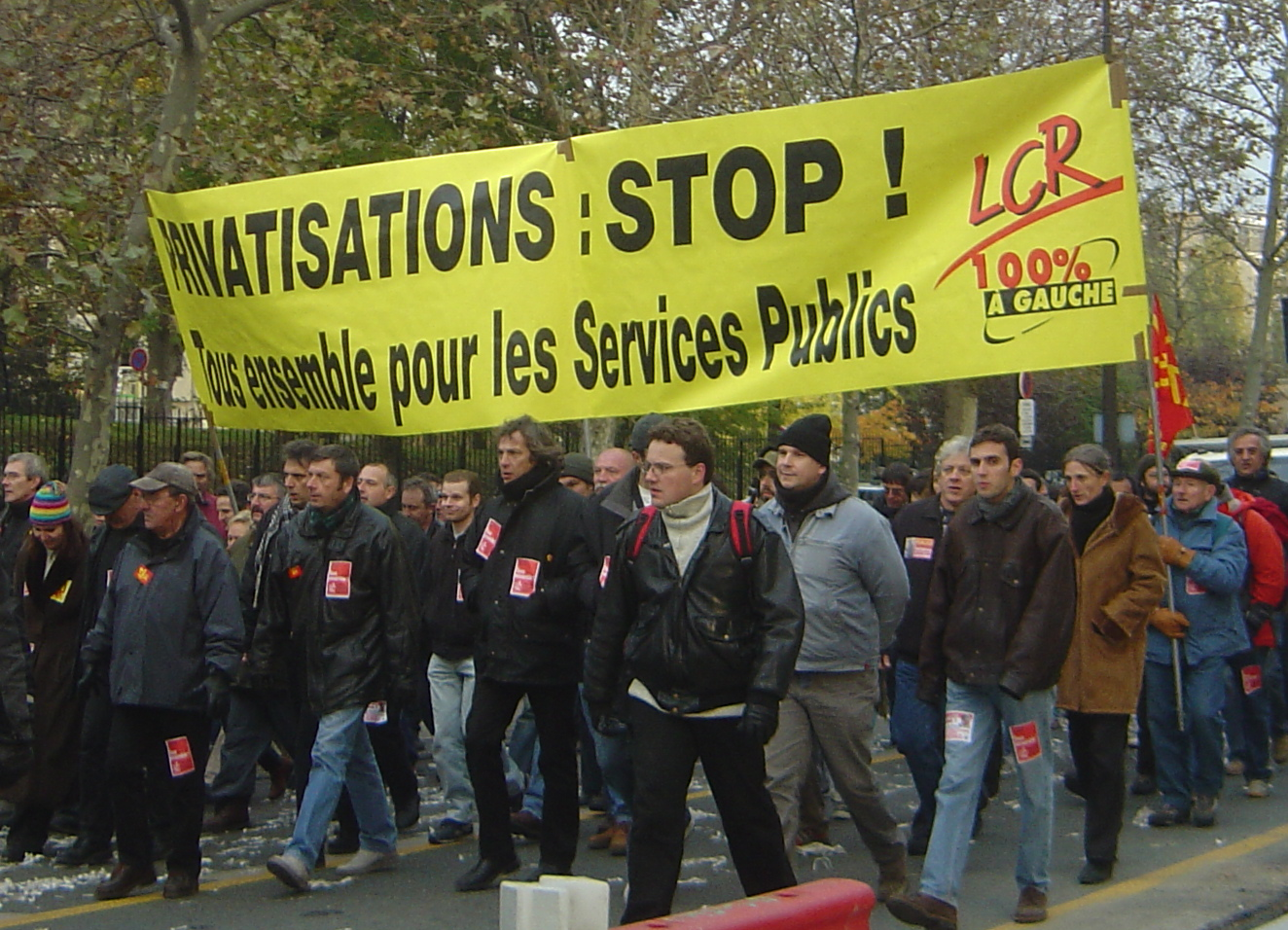
LCR protesters marching in a workforce demonstration in favour of public services and against privatization

In 2002, three trotskyist candidates ran in the election. Arlette Laguiller of Lutte Ouvrière got 5.72%, Olivier Besancenot of the Revolutionary Communist League (Ligue communiste révolutionnaire) got 4.25% and Daniel Gluckstein of the Workers' Party (Parti des Travailleurs) got 0.47%.

== Trotskyism in contemporary France ==
Trotskyist movements continue to influence French politics, particularly through electoral campaigns and activism in social movements. While the broader left has fragmented, organizations like Lutte Ouvrière, the NPA, and smaller groups like Revolution Permanente maintain the legacy of Trotskyist thought in the 21st century.

In 2016 Jean-Luc Mélenchon, formerly of the ICO, launched the left-wing political platform La France Insoumise (Unbowed France), subsequently endorsed by several parties, including his own Left Party and the French Communist Party. In the 2017 French Presidential Election, he received 19% in the first round. In the same election, Philippe Poutou of the New Anticapitalist Party, into which the Revolutionary Communist League dissolved itself in 2008, won 1.20% of the vote. The only openly Trotskyist candidate, Nathalie Arthaud of Lutte Ouvrière, won 0.64% of the vote.

=== Prominent Organizations ===
- Lutte Ouvrière (LO, Workers' struggle): Known for its electoral campaigns led by Arlette Laguiller and Nathalie Arthaud.
- New Anticapitalist Party (NPA): Formed from the LCR, it continues to advocate for radical leftist policies.
- Révolution Permanente : the french section of the Trotskyist Fraction – Fourth International, emphasizing contemporary issues like anti-racism and workers’ struggles.
