= Francois de Massot =

French political activist and writer

Francois de Massot was a political activist, writer, and journalist. He was the son of the Surrealist writer Pierre de Massot and an associate of Francis Picabia and André Breton. Massot was of French-Scottish extraction and fluent in English. He worked as a translator, including in the film industry.

== Career ==
Massot joined the Trotskyist movement in France as a young man just after the end of the Second World War. Like other young Trotskyists he was a work-volunteer in Tito's Yugoslavia. He supported the Marcel Bleibtreu-Pierre Lambert wing of the Parti Communiste Internationaliste (PCI) after they split with Pierre Frank and Michel Pablo in 1953 and remained a close associate of Pierre Lambert. De Massot gave an oration at Lambert's funeral.

For most of his life he has been a political activist with the PCI-OCI (Organisation Communiste Internationaliste) and its successors. He was, from an early time, responsible for the link between the Lambert group in France and the Healy Group in Britain (later to become the Socialist Labour League), as well as with the American Socialist Workers Party, the main components of the International Committee of the Fourth International (ICFI) from 1953 to 1963. In this capacity he regularly attended conferences of the Socialist Labour League and meetings of the ICFI.

He is the author of a book on the May–June events in France; was a journalist on Informations Ouvrieres, the OCI-PCI newspaper; has been an editor of La Verite, the OCI theoretical journal, and was in charge of the international work of the Organising Committee for the Reconstruction of the Fourth International and its successors. He has been chairman of the CERMTRI archive of Trotskyism in Paris. He died on October the 2nd, 2023.

== Publications ==
- Quelques Enseignements de Notre Histoire, Francois de Massot, SELIO, Paris
- La Grève générale (mai-juin 1968), suppl. au n° 437 d’Informations ouvrières, Paris
