= La Vérité (Trotskyist journal) =

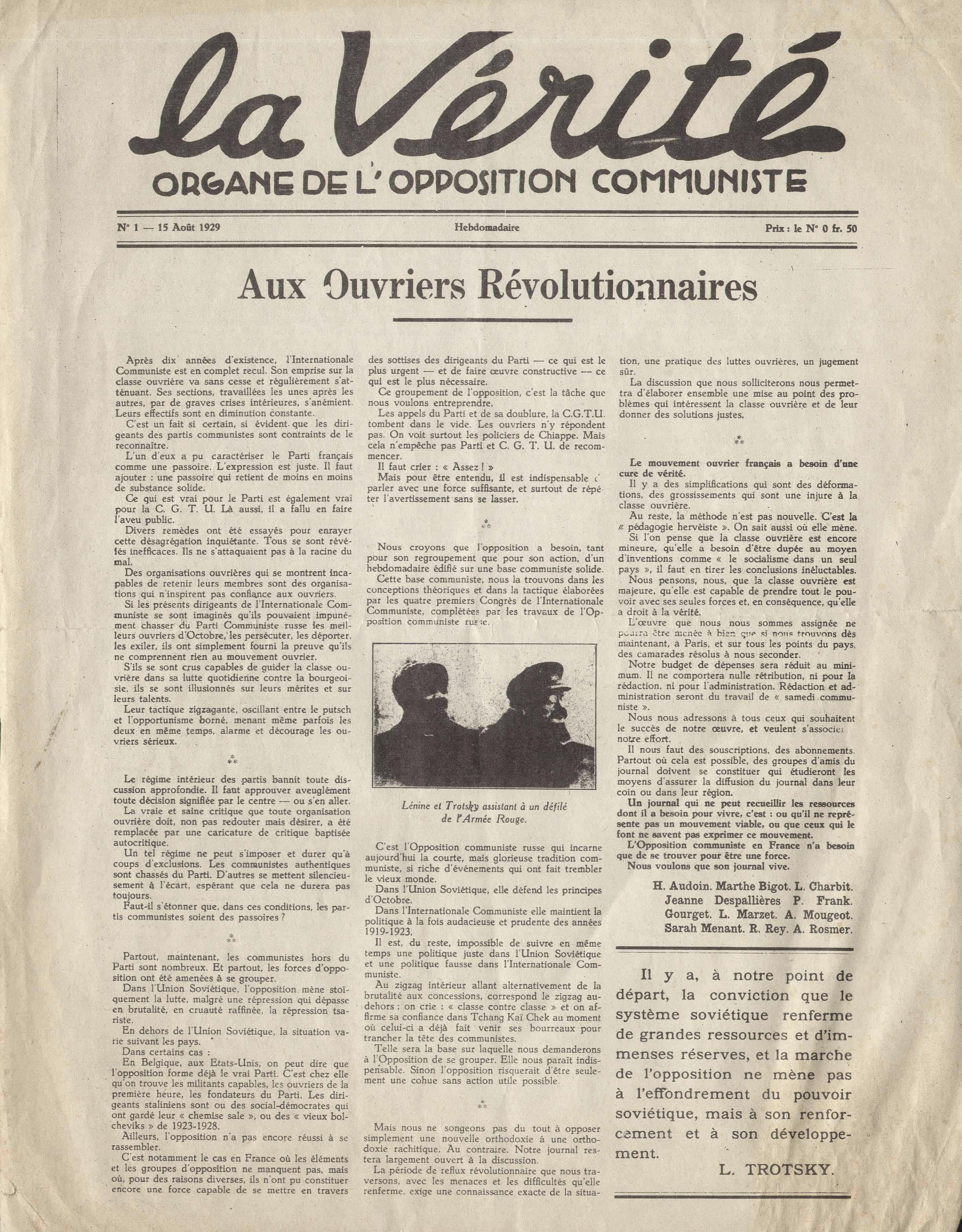
- Editor: Marc Gauquelin
- Former editors: Pierre Frank
- Categories: Radical politics
- Frequency: Weekly
- First issue: 15 August 1929
- Country: France
- Website: Fourth International
- ISSN: 1679-2742

La Vérité (The Truth) is the first Trotskyst publication in history, having its first issue published on August 15, 1929, in French. Its name refers to Pravda, which means Truth, and was chosen because Trotskyists believed that the French labor movement needed "Truth therapy".

Initially built by Trotsky, it has gone through several phases in its 96 years of existence. Created to fight against the bureaucratization of the French Communist Party, it became a reference for the labor movement in that country, always being published by organizations linked to Trotskyism. During the Occupation of France by Nazi Germany, it was published clandestinely, becoming the first publication of the French Resistance, and carrying out emblematic campaigns, such as the fight against the Compulsory Work Service deportations and anti-Semitism.

In the early 1970s it began to be published in other languages, such as Portuguese, English and Spanish, and in 1990 it became the Theoretical Review of Fourth International.

== From the Communist Opposition to the FSWI (1929-1936) ==
The first version, in weekly newspaper format, was agitated by Leon Trotsky after the failure of the discussions he had started with a group opposing the leadership of the French Communist Party that distributed the newspaper Contre le Courant (Against the Current). Trotsky made contact with Alfred Rosmer, Raymond Molinier, Pierre Barozine, Jan van Heijenoort, Pierre Frank, Pierre Naville and Gérard Rosenthal who went to Büyükada in Istanbul where Trotsky was in exile. The intention of the publication was to bring together communist militants who fought against the bureaucratic leadership of the CP, both outside and within the party.

During the preparation for the release of La Vérité, Trotsky sent a letter to the direction of the publication in which he stated:

His weekly is called The Truth. We've abused it enough, as has everyone else. However, it is a good and honest name. The truth is always revolutionary. To expose the oppressed to the truth of their situation is to pave the way for revolution.

— Leon Trotsky. "Open Letter to the Direction of The Truth", August 5, 1929

In a few months, the militants who were still in the CP were excluded. The Left Opposition grew even stronger when the group around the magazine La Lutte de Classe (The Class Struggle) met in January 1930. At the end of April 1930, La Vérité became the organ of a new political organization distinct from the CP: the Communist League. La Lutte de Classe continued its publication but became the theoretical journal of the Communist League.

In August 1934, militants from this organization joined the French Section of the Workers' International (FSWI) "with an unfurled flag". La Vérité becomes the organ of the Bolshevik-Leninist group of the FSWI.

During this period in the SFIO, the Bolshevik-Leninists (BL) campaigned for the construction of the Fourth International. At the XXXII congress of the FSWI, in Mulhouse, in June 1935, the BL activists became a large minority that began to have weight in the debates of the party.

In that same period, the CP turned 180 degrees in its policy towards the radicals and no longer opposed an alliance with the latter and the socialists. Trotskyists become embarrassing because the FSWI had to give a vote of "friendship" to the Stalinists, with a view to creating a Popular Front government. The Bolshevik-Leninist group was therefore expelled in January 1936. La Vérité then ceases to be published with issue 255.

== ICP and WPSP (1938-1939) ==
In January 1938, the Internationalist Communist Party (PCI) began to publish a theoretical magazine under the name of La Vérité, claiming the continuity of the publication of the Communist League, renumbering it from number 1, but with the indication "new series".

In October 1938, ICP militants decided to join the Workers and Peasants' Socialist Party (WPSP) led by Marceau Pivert. In June 1939, the WPSP excluded Trotskyist militants from the party. and the sixth and final issue of that series came out in August 1939.

== Clandestine (1940-1946) ==
As of August 30, 1940, the French Committees for the Fourth International once again edited La Vérité in newspaper format. It was the first clandestine publication of the French press and the first newspaper of the French Resistance. Marcel Hic was responsible for the publication until his arrest in October 1943.

The first 19 issues were typed and mimeographed and, from issue 20 onwards, 3,000 copies of each issue were printed (except the October 1942 and April and July 1943 issues). In December 1942 the Committees united under the Internationalist Workers' Party (POI). This unites with the Internationalist Communist Committee (ICC) and the October Group to form the Internationalist Communist Party (ICP) in March 1944. Both maintain La Vérité as their official organ.

The newspaper's political line during this period focuses on organizing the struggle against fascism, imperialism, war, deportations, racism and antisemitism. Advocate for universal brotherhood, world revolution and the creation of the Socialist United States of Europe.

=== Emblematic campaigns ===
During the period of War and occupation, two were the most emblematic campaigns:

==== Against deportations of Compulsory Work Service ====
Among those forced to leave for Germany, he organized the sabotage of production hand in hand with German workers fighting the Nazis. Organized demonstrations and blockades of trains carrying deportees to the STO, as in Brest in October 1942 or Lille. In mid-1943, they began to organize the most refractory to hide.

==== Against antisemitism ====
In its first issue, La Vérité published an article entitled Down with antisemitism. Then, in October 1941, he published Antisemitism, the Doctrine of Barbarism. In November 1941, an article denounced the situation of the Jews in the Drancy camp and ended with this appeal: "Comrades, we must everywhere organize solidarity with the imprisoned Jews. Like worker militants, they are also designated victims of fascism. Comrades, we cannot let them die."

In edition 45, of May 20, 1943, La Vérité is the first newspaper in occupied Europe to denounce the existence of the Auschwitz Concentration Camp, thanks to a direct witness who fled. The article describes living conditions, clothing, hygiene... It was such an important journalistic scoop that, through the voice of the Stalinist leader Fernand Grenier, excerpts from La Vérité were read on Radio Londres, although omitting that there were also German prisoners in Auschwitz.

=== Fight for legalization (1944-1946) ===
When the Vichy regime fell, the Trotskyists(reunified in March 1944 under the name of the Internationalist Communist Party) published 73 editions and a dozen special editions.. The Fourth Republic proclaimed freedom of the press, but for two years and under pressure from the Communist Party, La Vérité was not legalized.

At first, the Ministry of Information recognizes that the newspaper "meets all the conditions required by the Clandestine Press Federation". But a few weeks later, Albert Bayet, director of the Federation of the Clandestine Press, renamed in August 1944 as the French National Press Federation (FNPF), asked the newspaper's management to prove that the publication carried out "... a campaign in favor of France and its allies, England, USSR, United States, Republic of China, etc." Meanwhile, L'Humanité launches a smear campaign against Trotskyists described as "Gestapo agents". Trotskyists bitterly note "that freedom of the press is valid only for those who vow to leave intact the capitalist world, responsible for fascism and war". They are also astonished at the ruthlessness against their newspaper when their organization, the Internationalist Communist Party, became legal on June 22, 1945. The essential problem of this non-legalization is that La Vérité cannot use the stocks of paper that remained rationed until 1958. To circumvent this ban, the mention "internal bulletin" is registered up to number 110 (mid-February 1946). La Vérité will only be legalized in 1946.

== The 1952 split ==
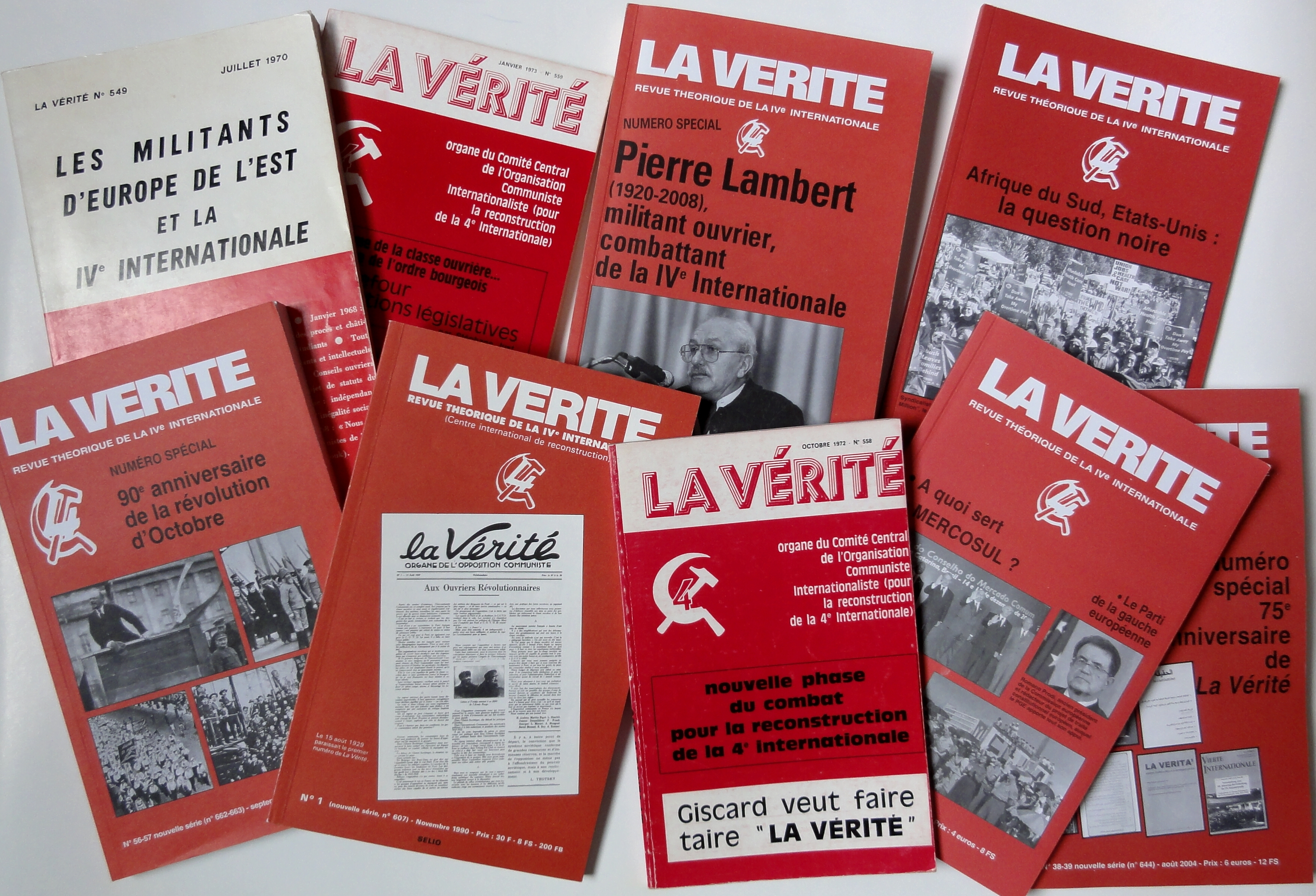
Some covers of The Truth in French since 1970

In July 1952, the Internationalist Communist Party suffered the most serious crisis in its history, whose repercussions will last at an international level until today.. Two trends collided around the line of "entrism" in the Communist and Socialist parties, adopted by the Executive Committee of the Fourth International in February 1952. The majority of the ICP, around Pierre Lambert, rejected this decision and were expelled in July. This group will maintain the publication of La Vérité. The minority of the ICP, around Pierre Frank (member of the European leadership of the Fourth International), started to publish the magazine La Vérité des travailleurs from August 1952.

The ICP majority, which would become the Internationalist Communist Organization, would continue to publish La Vérité in newspaper form until November 1958.

== The struggle for the reconstruction of the International ==
On November 16, 1953, the National Committee of the Socialist Workers Party (SWP) of the USA publishes A Letter to Trotskyists Throughout the World and organizes the formation of the International Committee of the Fourth International (ICFI) together with militants from Ireland and Argentina, with the French PCI and with the entire sections of China and Austria.

In 1966, the ICFI organizes its third Conference and adopts the Reconstruction of the Fourth International as a resolution, dividing among its members a series of tasks to achieve this goal.

In July 1972, the ICFI held an international conference, bringing together, in addition to the Internationalist Communist Organization, other Trotskyist organizations from Eastern Europe and Latin America, notably the Política Obrera of Argentina, led by Jorge Altamira, the Partido Obrero Revolucionario of Bolivia, led by Guillermo Lora and the October Group from Brazil. This Conference founded the Organizing Committee for the Reconstruction of the Fourth International (OCRFI).

In its resolutions, the ICFI recognized the organizational and theoretical dispersion of the sections of the Fourth International. OCRFI went beyond this observation, arguing that the central reason for this dispersion was the lack of an international governing body for the QI, proposing the construction of this international leadership based on the representation of national organizations whose common agreement was the Transitional Program. With the aim of unifying the theoretical formulation in all sections, in November 1990, La Vérité becomes the Theoretical Journal of the Fourth International, renumbering once again to number 1 and starting to be translated into several languages (including Portuguese and Spanish) and distributed by various organizations around the world.

== Timeline ==
La Vérité has had several subtitles over time. Following the timeline of each of them:

== See also ==
- Pierre Lambert
- Workers' Party of Socialist Unity
