= French Turn =

Entry of the French Trotskyists into the French Socialist Party

The French Turn was the name given to the entry between 1934 and 1936 of the French Trotskyists of the Communist League into the French Section of the Workers' International (SFIO, the contemporary name of the French Socialist Party). The French Turn was repeated by Trotskyists in other countries during the 1930s.

== In France ==
The idea of the French Turn originated after the 6 February 1934 riots around the Stavisky Affair in 1934, which led to the downfall of the Daladier government. Fearing that fascists would seize power as they had in Germany and Italy, the Socialist Party (SFIO) and French Communist Party (PCF) formed a "united front".

The Communist League, the French section of the International Left Opposition, remained at this time a small and predominantly middle-class organization. Leon Trotsky saw a great opportunity in the United Front for an expansion of the Trotskyists' ranks. While he saw no possibility of re-entering the Communist Party because of its lack of internal democracy, he believed that the Trotskyists could build a base in the SFIO, which had moved to the left under the leadership of Léon Blum. Trotsky formally proposed the "French Turn" into the SFIO in June 1934.

The Communist League's leaders were divided over the issue of entering the SFIO. While Raymond Molinier was the most supportive of Trotsky's proposal, Pierre Naville vocally opposed the motion, and Pierre Frank remained ambivalent. After two months of formal discussion, the League voted to dissolve into the SFIO in August 1934. In the Socialist Party, they formed the Bolshevik-Leninist Group (Groupe Bolchevik-Leniniste, GBL). Naville split from the group.

Upon entering the SFIO, the GBL began to build a base among the party's left wing. The Trotskyists' influence was strongest in the youth affiliate, Young Socialists, and the Parisian party branches. At the Mulhouse party congress of June 1935, the Trotskyists led an unsuccessful campaign to prevent the United Front from expanding into a "popular front", which would include the middle-class Radical Party. Jean Rous of the GBL was elected to the SFIO's National Administrative Committee.

After the formation of the Popular Front, Trotsky advised the GBL to break with the SFIO and begin forming a new revolutionary party. This created new divisions within the GBL's leadership. While Naville supported a split, Molinier hoped to develop connections with Marceau Pivert, one of the primary leaders of the SFIO's left wing. This led to a confused and awkward departure by the Trotskyists from the Socialist Party in early 1936, which drew only about six hundred people from the party. Molinier and Naville formed two separate parties, and their divisions were reinforced over how to relate to Pivert's new party, the Workers and Peasants Socialist Party (PSOP).

The French Trotskyists were dispersed when World War II began, but in 1944 they re-unified into the Internationalist Communist Party (PCI).

== In other countries ==
In other countries, the French Turn was repeated by Trotsky's other followers:

- In the United States, the Workers Party of the United States entered the Socialist Party of America in 1936. They formed a faction around the newspaper Socialist Appeal. They drew their strongest support among members of the Young People's Socialist League, the SP's youth affiliate. The Trotskyists and their supporters were expelled from the SP in 1937 and in 1938 formed a new party, the Socialist Workers Party.
- Factions of Trotsky's followers in Great Britain, who were organized as the Communist League in 1932, entered the Independent Labour Party and the Labour Party in subsequent years. They emerged from these parties in 1944 to form the Revolutionary Communist Party.

== Consequences ==
The French Turn remained a lasting issue of debate between Trotsky's often-divided followers after World War II. Some believed that the French Turn was a success, and they promoted the idea that entryism should be continued. The main advocates of this view in the 1950s and 1960s were Michel Pablo, secretary of the International Secretariat of the Fourth International, and Gerry Healy, secretary of the International Committee of the Fourth International, which both supported entrism. Pablo developed a special type of the turn which involved working underground in the Communist Parties: this was strongly opposed by the ICFI.

Others in the Trotskyist movement have believed the French Turn to be either a failure or unprincipled and advocated the independence of Trotskyists from social-democratic and communist parties: Hugo Oehler developed this view at the time of the French Turn. The issue of entryism remains a point of contention among Trotskyists to this day.

== See also ==
- Entryism
- Trotskyism
- Second International
- Fourth International
