= Michel Lequenne =

French politician and activist (1921–2020)

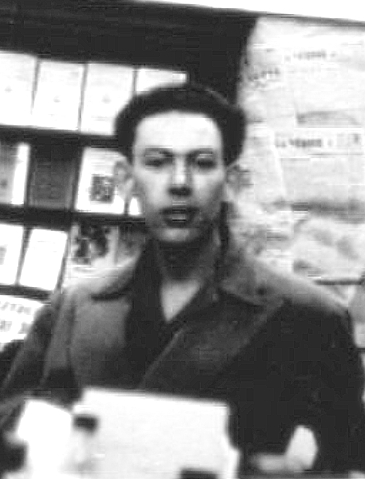
- Michel lequenne in 1946
- Born: 25 May 1921; Le Havre, France
- Died: 13 February 2020 (aged 98); Paris, France
- Occupations: Politician; Activist

Michel Lequenne (25 May 1921 – 13 February 2020) was a French politician and activist. He was particularly interested in Christopher Columbus and the Russian Revolution.

== Biography ==
Lequenne began working at age 14 in the youth hostels of France. He participated in the clandestine congress of Secular Center of Youth Hostels in 1940 before it was shut down by the German Occupation. He moved to Le Mans after the bombing of Le Havre. Shortly thereafter, he left for Paris as part of the Service du travail obligatoire, where he worked as an assistant accountant. He began working with Trotskyist groups, and aided in the formation of the Internationalist Communist Party (PCI).

Lequenne was forced to relocate thrice during the Occupation, but eventually moved back to Paris to work as a construction worker. As a construction worker, he joined a union managed by the General Confederation of Labour. He moved up in the ranks of the union until he was unmasked as a Trotskyist by the Communist Party.

Lequenne became a leftist leader in the PCI alongside Pierre Frank, Marcel Bleibtreu, and Marcel Gibelin, and soon led the Paris region of the party. In early 1947, the party became controlled by the so-called "right-wing", led by Yvan Craipeau, Paul Parisot, Albert Demazière, and Jean-René Chauvin. Lequenne was placed in charge of opening two suburban party offices by Craipeau. He worked as a proofreader for the magazine Quatrième Internationale before finding work full-time at Éditions du Pré aux clercs as he was hired by Jean Malaquais. He often had disputes with Jacques Prévert, André Verdet, and Julien Blanc. After the departures of Parisot and Craipeau, Lequenne became an editor at La Vérité and L'Unité.

From 1948 to 1950, Yugoslavia's breakup with the Soviet Union was the central area of Lequenne's work. He also became an editorial secretary at Contemporains, a political journal directed by Clara Malraux. Contemporains was founded by individuals who split from the French Communist Party over disputes about the Yugoslav affair, such as Jean Cassou, Jean Duvignaud, Claude Aveline, and Louis Martin-Chauffier.

In 1952, the Pabloite movement swept across the PCI, and the Pabloite minority split from the party. Lequenne stuck with the party, and shortly thereafter became editor-in-chief at La Vérité. He also headed the Lenin Circle, which was a discussion group between Trotskyist and non-Trotskyist members of the PCI.

In 1953, party Leader Pierre Lambert created a policy against La Vérité due to their coverage of the Soviet Union following the death of Joseph Stalin. This caused Lequenne to join the Unified Socialist Party (PSU). However, he returned to the PCI in 1965. Lequenne was a signatory of the Manifesto of the 121. He created the Cercle Karl Marx, which helped unite him with surrealist groups.

During all this time, Lequenne also worked as a publisher, working for Encyclopædia Universalis. From 1955 to 1979, with Soledad Estorach, he translated the entire set of works by Christopher Columbus. He became an art critic in 1966, working for Politis. In 1992, he published Christophe Colomb, amiral de la mer océane.

After Pierre Juquin's failed bid for President in 1988, Lequenne resigned from the Revolutionary Communist League.

Lequenne died on 13 February 2020 at the age of 98.

== Publications ==
Later in life, Lequenne devoted much of his time to publishing literary works. After the publication of Christophe Colomb conte ses mythes, Le Trotskisme, une histoire sans fard, Le Catalogue (pour mémoires), and La Révolution de Bilitis, he published the first volume of Grandes Dames des lettres, a gallery with portraits of women representing the feminist movements of the 1970s. He also published Éloge de l’utopie and Pour une nouvelle histoire de l’art. He published Contre-Révolution dans la Révolution online, which covered the Russian Revolution in October 1917.
