= Lucienne Abraham =

French politician

- Born: 1 March 1916; 15th arrondissement of Paris
- Died: 4 February 1970 (aged 53); 12th arrondissement of Paris
- Political party: Internationalist Communist Party (France) French Communist Party

Lucienne Abraham (1 March 1916 – 4 February 1970), also known as Michèle Mestre, was a French Trotskyist politician.

== Life ==
She joined the Internationalist Communist Party (PCI) and became the editor of its newspaper, La Verité. From at least 1946, she was aligned with Mathias Corvin, known for his generous attitude towards the Soviet Union.

In 1950, a dispute developed in which the PCI refused to follow the line of the Fourth International. Prominently among the PCI's Central Committee, Mestre supported the International's line. As a result, in 1951, she was removed as editor of the newspaper and sidelined in the party.

In 1952, the leadership of the Fourth International removed the Central Committee and created a new one representing their supporters, based around Mestre and Pierre Frank. The actions of the International prompted a split, the majority of party members leaving to form a new group of the same name, led by Pierre Lambert and Marcel Bleibtreu. The following year, the Fourth International itself split, Mestre's group siding with the International Secretariat of the Fourth International, and Lambert's joining the International Committee of the Fourth International.

In 1954, Mestre walked out of the Fourth Congress of the Fourth International, along with Corvin and a small group of supporters. They soon joined the French Communist Party (PCF), where they formed a "Revolutionary Tendency". Within the PCF, she renounced Trotskyism and helped uncover some Trotskyist entrists.

After the Sino-Soviet Split, Mestre and Corvin were the first to distribute Maoist literature in France.
