= Orthodox Trotskyism =

Marxist political ideology

Orthodox Trotskyism is a branch of Trotskyism which aims to adhere more closely to the philosophy, methods and positions of Leon Trotsky and the early Fourth International, Vladimir Lenin and Karl Marx than other avowed Trotskyists.

== Overview ==
The first Trotskyist international to describe itself as orthodox Trotskyist was the International Committee of the Fourth International (ICFI). Shortly after its formation in 1953, it wrote an open letter in which it described the tradition of the Fourth International as orthodox Trotskyism and called for orthodox Trotskyists to rally to the ICFI. Orthodox Trotskyism embodied their opposition to the International Secretariat of the Fourth International (ISFI), whose policies they described as "Pabloism". The ICFI claimed that it alone defended the principles of the Fourth International while the "Pabloites" subordinated the international workers movement to the bureaucracies or bourgeois leaders.

The subsequent history of orthodox Trotskyism is largely that of the ICFI. Its largest section, the American Socialist Workers Party, left to join the "Pabloites" in 1963, eventually breaking with Trotskyism altogether in the 1980s, although a section remained loyal to the ICFI and are today the Socialist Equality Party. The orthodox Trotskyists suffered another split in 1973 between the Socialist Labour League (SLL) of Gerry Healy and the Internationalist Communist Organisation (OCI) of Pierre Lambert. The official explanation for the split was that the OCI believed that orthodox Trotskyism should be based on Trosky's Transitional Programme while the SLL held that as the Transitional Programme was merely the outcome of Trotsky's application of Marxist dialectics, it was possible and even necessary to revise Trotsky's programme as the objective situation changed. A French section returned to the ICFI in 2016 as the Socialist Equality Party (France) (PES).

Today, the surviving ICFI continue to characterise their politics as orthodox Trotskyism. Other groups have come to orthodox Trotskyism from different backgrounds and either like the International Trotskyist Committee believe that the ICFI later degenerated, or like the Liaison Committee of Militants for a Revolutionary Communist International that the ICFI never represented healthy orthodox Trotskyism, but that they support the early Fourth International and its approach in a similar manner.

The Spartacist League (US) represents another wing of "orthodox" Trotskyism. The group's founder, James Robertson, and his supporters were expelled from the American Socialist Workers Party in 1964 for opposing the SWP's rapprochement with "Pabloism." But unlike their former factional associates who would later found the Workers League (now the Socialist Equality Party), the Spartacists did not embrace Gerry Healy's ICFI, objecting to Healy's characterization of Castro's Cuba as "state capitalist" rather than a "deformed workers state." The SL later formed its own "international," now known as the International Communist League (Fourth Internationalist).

Many orthodox Trotskyist groups attach particular importance in holding that the Soviet Union was a degenerated workers' state and other similar societies are deformed workers' states. However, many other Trotskyist groups which have not described themselves as orthodox Trotskyist also hold this view.

Orthodox Trotskyism has been critiqued by activists from the third camp socialist tradition and from the International Socialist Tendency. Max Shachtman of the Workers Party was describing the Fourth International as orthodox Trotskyist by 1948. The IST similarly criticises both the ICFI and the ISFI traditions as orthodox Trotskyist.
