= Communist League (1930) =

Communist League Ligue communiste
- Abbreviation: LC
- Founder: Alfred Rosmer; Pierre Naville; Gérard Rosenthal; Pierre Frank; Raymond Molinier
- Founded: April 1930
- Dissolved: 1936
- Split from: French Communist Party
- Newspaper: La Vérité; La Lutte de Classe
- Ideology: Trotskyism
- Political position: Far-left
- National affiliation: SFIO (1934–June 1935)

The Communist League (Ligue communiste) was a French Trotskyist party established in 1930, which published the journal La Vérité. It brought together French members of the International Left Opposition before the proclamation of the Fourth International in 1938. Following the far-right riots of February 6, 1934, it joined the SFIO as an organized tendency, forming the "Bolshevik-Leninist group" (BL), which was expelled at the SFIO Congress in Mulhouse in June 1935. During this period, the Ligue communiste officially continued to exist but was dormant and its members split.

== Formation ==
Created in April 1930 as a secret entryist tendency within the PCF, the Ligue communiste organized around the magazine La Vérité, launched in August 1929 under the direction of Alfred Rosmer. Rosmer, under direct instruction from Leon Trotsky, sought to unify two rival factions of French Trotskyism, divided primarily by personal disputes. These factions included Pierre Naville and Gérard Rosenthal on one side, and Raymond Molinier and Pierre Frank on the other.

The recently started La Lutte de Classe (Class Struggle) continued its publication and became the theoretical journal of the Communist League.

The Ligue communiste initially comprised about fifty militants, with a small leadership circle around Pierre Naville and Raymond Molinier. After disputes, Naville and Rosenthal ousted Molinier and Frank from leadership roles, angering Trotsky, who sought arbitration through an international delegation including Andrés Nin and Amadeo Bordiga in 1931. Rosmer eventually resigned from the Ligue communiste in December 1930.

== Entryism into the SFIO ==
After the 6 February 1934 riots, Trotsky advocated for entryism, which led the Ligue communiste to join the SFIO and form the Bolshevik-Leninist group. This strategy, known as the French Turn, mirrored similar efforts worldwide, such as the Workers Party of the United States joining the Socialist Party of America in 1936.

The approach faced challenges, and at the SFIO Congress in Mulhouse (June 1935), Trotskyists were sidelined as Léon Blum favored alignment with the French Communist Party.

== Splits and reorganizations ==
In August 1935, after insurrectionary strikes, Trotsky abandoned entryism, advocating for an independent revolutionary party. During this period, the Ligue communiste officially continued to exist but was dormant and its members split after being expelled from the SFIO. Most members, including Pierre Naville, joined the Workers and Peasants' Socialist Party (POI) founded in 1936, while others, such as Raymond Molinier and Pierre Frank, joined the Internationalist Communist Party (PCI), with some focusing on direct worker soviet structures.

== Bibliography ==
- Michel Roger, Envers et contre tout, de l'opposition de gauche à l'union communiste (1924–1939), Ni patrie ni frontières, Paris, 2017.
