= Rodolphe Prager =

Trotskyist politician

Rodolphe "Rudi" Prager (March 31, 1918 in Berlin – 2002) was a French militant Trotskyist politician and publicist.

== Early years ==
Born in Berlin, he emigrated with his parents to Paris in 1929, joined the French Socialist Youth in 1932 and the Gauche Bolshevik- Leniniste (Bolshevik-Leninist Left) in 1935.

== Career ==
When the Trotskyist Youth, the Jeunesses socialistes révolutionaires, was set up in 1936, he was a member of its Central Committee. From 1937 he joined the Parti Communiste Internationaliste (International Communist Party) of Pierre Frank and Raymond Molinier, was elected onto its Central Committee, and was a founder and leader of the Jeunesses Communistes Internationalistes. When the Molinier tendency sent its delegation abroad at the outbreak of war, when it was made illegal, Comrade Prager represented the youth on this committee, and along with Georges Vereeken and Molinier and Frank edited its Correspondance Internationaliste.

From December 1939 to May 1940 Comrade Prager was imprisoned but in July 1940 he returned to Paris illegally and helped to reconstruct the Trotskyist organisation that later assumed the name of the Comité Communiste Internationaliste (International Communist Committee). As one of its leaders, he conducted the negotiations that led to the unification of his group with the POI of Marcel Hic and the European Secretariat of Michel Pablo, on which he sat as a representative from September 1943 onwards. On the Political Bureau of the Internationalist Communist Party (PCI), he had special responsibility for its anti-colonial work, and had charge of the same aspect of the work of the International Secretariat from 1946 onwards.

During the fifties and sixties he was elected onto the Political Bureau of the PCI and served on the Control Commission of the United Secretariat of the Fourth International from 1964 to 1969. The third and fourth volumes of his documentary survey of the International Secretariat of the Fourth International covering the period up to 1952 are shortly to appear.
