= Maurice Nadeau =

French writer (1911–2013)

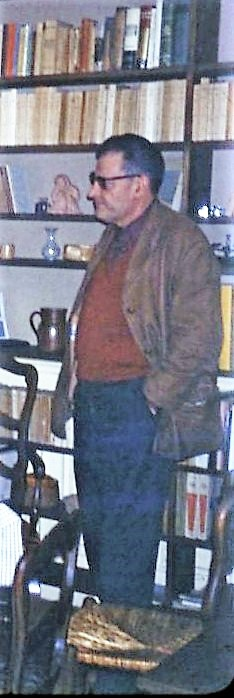
Nadeau in 1968

Maurice Nadeau (French: [nado]; 21 May 1911 – 16 June 2013) was a French teacher, writer, literary critic, and editor. He was born and died in Paris.

He was the father of the actress Claire Nadeau and the film director Gilles Nadeau.

== Biography ==
Orphaned during the First World War, Nadeau attended the École normale supérieure de Saint-Cloud, where he discovered politics. In 1930, he joined the French Communist Party, where he worked with Georges Cogniot. He was expelled from the party in 1932. He then read Lenin and Leon Trotsky, which inspired him to join the Ligue Communiste, a Trotskyist party created by Pierre Naville. In this period, he frequently met Louis Aragon, André Gide, André Breton, Jacques Prévert and Benjamin Péret.

Made a teacher of literature in 1936, he taught until 1945, briefly as a teacher of literature in Prades, but he preferred to be a schoolteacher in Thiais in order to move closer to Paris. He then collaborated with André Breton on the review Clé, which protested against the internment in France of Spanish republicans in the early phases of the Spanish Civil War.

After a brief period of mobilization, he returned to teaching during the Nazi occupation and engaged in clandestine political activities. His resistance network (which included a German soldier who would be executed) was dismantled in the course of a raid. David Rousset and several of his other members were deported. Rousset's wife helped Nadeau to escape deportation.

This first part of his life led to the publication in 1945 of his Histoire du surréalisme (History of Surrealism) published in the United States in 1965 and the United Kingdom in 1968). The book was the major reference work on surrealism for long despite the fact that André Breton disliked it.

At the Liberation, Nadeau became a critic for the resistance newspaper Combat, edited by Albert Camus, with the help of its editor-in-chief Pascal Pia. He ran the literary page for seven years and brought to prominence authors such as Georges Bataille, Jean Genet, René Char, Henri Michaux, Claude Simon and Henry Miller. He also began editing the works of the Marquis de Sade. He stunned his contemporaries by coming to the defense of Louis-Ferdinand Céline. In 1982, he wrote a fine introduction (replacing that of John Fowles) to the French edition of The Book of Ebenezer Le Page, published by Maurice Nadeau/Papyrus under the title Sarnia, the Latin name for Guernsey, the setting of the novel.
