= Massot =

Massot is a surname of the following people

- Aude Massot (born 1983), French comic book author
- Bruno Massot (born 1989), French-born figure skater
- Firmin Massot (1766–1849), Swiss portrait painter
- Francois de Massot, political activist, writer and journalist
- Joe Massot (1933–2002), writer and film director
- Michel Massot (born 1960), Belgian jazz musician
- Nicolás Massot (born 1984), Argentine politician
- Pepe Massot (born 1995), Spanish racing driver
- William Massot (born 1977), French association football player
