= Fred Zeller =

French painter and political activist

- Born: Frédéric Victor Zeller; March 26, 1912; Paris, France
- Died: 7 February 2003 (aged 90); Bergerac, Dordogne, France
- Known for: Painting
- Style: Surrealism, Symbolism
- Movement: l’École Nationale Supérieure des Arts Décoratifs de la rue d’Ulm
- Elected: Grand Orient de France
- Website: fredzeller.fr

Frédéric Victor Zeller (26 March 1912 – 7 February 2003) was a French painter, and political activist.

Zeller was a militant Trotskyist during the years 1930-40. He was elected to lead the Grand Orient de France (GODF) in 1971, a position he held until 1973.

== The interwar period ==
Coming from a relatively wealthy family, very close to artistic circles, Zeller spent his childhood in Melun and his early studies in Jacques Amyot college. At 15, he bought his first great painting box from a painter of the Barbizon School: Armand Cassagne. Zeller then continued his studies at the School of Decorative Arts in the Rue d'Ulm.

Zeller joined the Socialist Students in 1931, later on the Young Socialists and finally to the SFIO . He soon became a leader of the Socialist Youth, in which he led a trend called "revolutionary socialist youth" that opposed both the reformist wing more, close to the leadership of the SFIO and aware pro-Trotskyist Bolshevik Leninist close group Gérard Rosenthal. In 1935, he created a magazine, Revolution, which he ran with a Trotskyist activist, David Rousset.

Zeller was excluded from the Secretary General of Young Socialists of the Seine, by the leadership of the SFIO after the Mulhouse Congress 1935. Seeking political benchmarks, Zeller was persuaded by Jean van Heijenoort to respond to the invitation by Trotsky to join him in Norway, where he was under house arrest. It is this meeting that committed Zeller into joining the Trotskyist movement, within the Internationalist Workers' Party.

== World War II ==
Opposed to the Munich agreement and Nazism, Zeller became part of the French Resistance from the start of the German occupation of France.

After the armistice of June 1940, Zeller united with the Fourth International Committee of Yvan Craipeau and POI. On 30 August 1940 the first underground newspaper of the Occupation, The Truth is released. He was part of, and led, the National Republican Movement alongside Henri Sellier and others.

== Post war ==
After the war, Zeller joined the Internationalist Communist Party, from September 1946 to the end of 1947, before participating in the creation of the Revolutionary Democratic Rally.

Zeller then withdrew progressively from activism to devote himself to painting, painting mainly surrealism and symbolism. In 1948, he retired to Èze, a small village in the French alps, and two years later he created a museum of local history.

In 1953 he received the lodge "Masonic Vanguard" of the Masonic of the Grand Orient of France, Fred Zeller was elected Grand Master of GODF in 1971, a position he held until 1973.

Zeller became a Member of the Socialist Party in 1957, he created the brotherly Study Circle and Socialist Action, led by former Trotskyists, and serves as a bridge between the Grand Orient and the SFIO. Until 1960, he was close to the current Socialist Nation of Auguste Lecoeur and Pierre Hervé.

Zeller died on 7 February 2003 in Bergerac, aged ninety years.

In 2009, a retrospective exhibition of his paintings was presented to the Centre for Education and Research ENSAM.

In 2012, the Grand Master of the Grand Orient of France, Guy Arcizet inaugurates the Paris headquarters of the Masonic a plaque commemorating the work of Zeller, calling him "the initiator of the externalization of the work of the Grand Orient of France," said Guy Arcizet on this occasion.
