= New Left (disambiguation) =

The New Left is a term used for activists in the United Kingdom and United States who sought a broad range of reforms in the 1960s-70s.

New Left may also refer to:

== Political groups and movements ==
- New Left (China), a school of political thought in China
- New Left (Croatia), a Croatian political party
- New Left (Greece), a Greek political party
- New Left (Montenegro), a Montenegrin extra-parliamentary political party
- New Left in France, an organized caucus in the French Socialist Party
- New Left group, the current name of the socialist group in the French National Assembly
- New Left (Trentino-Alto Adige/Südtirol), a list in the 1978 Trentino-Alto Adige/Südtirol regional election in Italy
- New Left in Japan, the Japanese offshoot of the Western New Left movement
- New Left (Poland), a Polish political party
- New Left Movement (Peru), a Peruvian political party

== Other uses ==
- The New Left (band), an American band co-founded by Kyle Cook of Matchbox Twenty
- The New Left: The Anti-Industrial Revolution, a collection of essays by Ayn Rand

== See also ==
- New Right (disambiguation)
