= Old Right =

Old Right may refer to:

- The ideology and policies of the Conservative Party that predated the ideological shift led by Margaret Thatcher, see one-nation conservatism
- Old Right (United States), an American political movement in the 1930s–1960s

== See also ==
- New Right (disambiguation)
- Paleoconservatism
