= Internationalist Workers Party =

French political party

Internationalist Workers Party Parti ouvrier internationaliste
- Abbreviation: POI
- Leader: Pierre Naville
- Founder: Pierre Naville; Raymond Molinier; Pierre Frank; Yvan Craipeau; Fred Zeller
- Founded: May 1936
- Dissolved: 15 June 1939
- Merger of: Revolutionary Workers' Party; The Commune; Revolutionary Socialist Youth
- Merged into: PCI
- Newspaper: La Lutte ouvrière
- Ideology: Communism; Trotskyism
- Political position: Far-left
- International affiliation: Fourth International

The Internationalist Workers Party (French: Parti ouvrier internationaliste, POI) was a French Trotskyist party established in 1936 after the exclusion of militant Trotskyists from the French Section of the Workers' International in 1935 and dissolved in 1939 when most of the militants had rejoined the Workers and Peasants' Socialist Party. It was an official section of the Fourth International.
