= Denise Naville =

French writer and translator

Denise Lévy, née Kahn, later Denise Naville (1896-1979) was a French writer and translator. Active in early surrealism, she and her husband Pierre Naville later moved away from surrealist activity to work with Leon Trotsky. She translated writing by Trotsky, Friedrich Hölderlin, Hans Erich Nossack, Carl von Clausewitz, Friedrich Engels, Nikolai Bukharin and Paul Celan from German into French.

== Life ==
Denise Kahn was born on June 26, 1896, to a French-speaking family in Sarreguemines, then part of the German imperial province of Alsace-Lorraine. Simone Kahn (later Simone Breton) was a cousin. By 1920 she was an active part of socialist intellectual life in Strasbourg.

In 1921 she married Georges Lévy. Moving to Paris, she used her bilingualism to introduce friends to presurrealist currents in German literature. Andre Breton, Louis Aragon, Rene Char and Paul Eluard all wrote poems to her.

In 1926 she married Pierre Naville, the founding co-editor of La Révolution surréaliste. In the late 1920s the pair moved away from surrealism to concentrate on supporting Trotsky against the Stalization of the Communist International. They became friends of Leon and Natalia Trotsky in exile. She helped Trotsky translate several of his books into German, and she translated his Towards Socialism or Capitalism? into French.

She died on 20 January 1969 in Paris.

Kahn also made translations of Arnold Schönberg's Treaty of Harmony, as well as work by Karl Marx, Frege and Ludwig Wittgenstein, which were never published. Louis Aragon's letters to Denise Lévy have been published, as have those of her cousin Simone Breton.

== Works ==
=== Translations ===
- (anon.) 'Leonce et Lena' by Georg Büchner, Commerce, 1924.
- Correspondance complète by Friedrich Hölderlin. Paris: Gallimard, 1948. Translated from the German Interview mit dem Tode.
- Interview avec la mort by Hans Erich Nossack. Paris: Gallimard, 1948.
- Dialectique de la nature by Friedrich Engels. Paris: Marcel Rivière, 1950.
- De la guerre by Carl von Clausewitz. Paris: Les Editions de Minuit, 1955. With a preface by Camille Rougeron and an introduction by Pierre Naville. Translated from the German Vom Kriege.
- L'Économie politique du rentier by Nikolai Bukharin

=== Other writing ===
- 'Textes surrealistes', La Révolution surréaliste, No. 3 (April 1925)
