= Centre d'Etudes et de Recherches sur les Mouvements Trotskyste et Révolutionnaires Internationaux =

The Centre d'Etudes et de Recherches sur les Mouvements Trotskyste et Révolutionnaires Internationaux or Centre for Study and Research on the International Trotskyist and Revolutionary Movements (CERMTRI) is an archive of primarily Trotskyist material in Paris, France. Its origin lies with the documentation of the OCI and its members but it has grown to include other historical publications, documents and archives as well.
