= New Right (disambiguation) =

New Right is a descriptive term for various right-wing political groups or policies in different countries.

Specific uses of the term include:

- European New Right, far-right political movement that emerged in Europe in the 1960s
- Nouvelle Droite, a French political movement that started in the late 1960s
- Noua Dreaptă, a Romanian political party established in 2000
- New Rights Party, a Georgian political party established in 2001
- New Right (Netherlands), a political party (2003–2007)
- New Right (UK), a think tank established in 2005
- New Right (Denmark), a political party established in 2015
- New Right (Greece), a political party established in 2016
- New Right (Israel), a political party established in 2018
- Nova Direita, a Portuguese political party established in 2024
- Alt-lite, also known as the New Right

== See also ==
- Old Right (disambiguation)
- New Left (disambiguation)
