= Far-left politics in France =

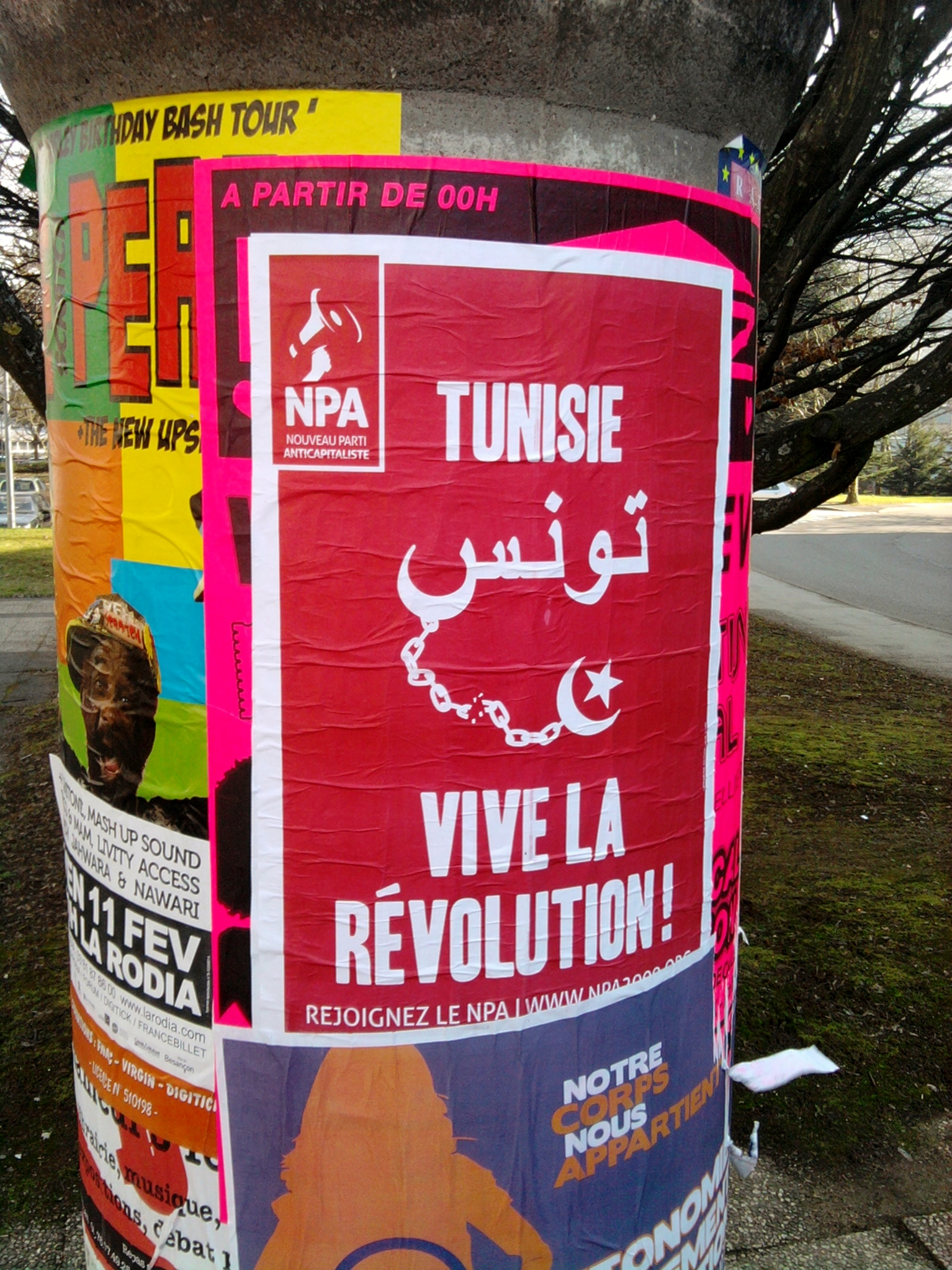
Poster by the New Anticapitalist Party in Besançon supporting the Tunisian revolution

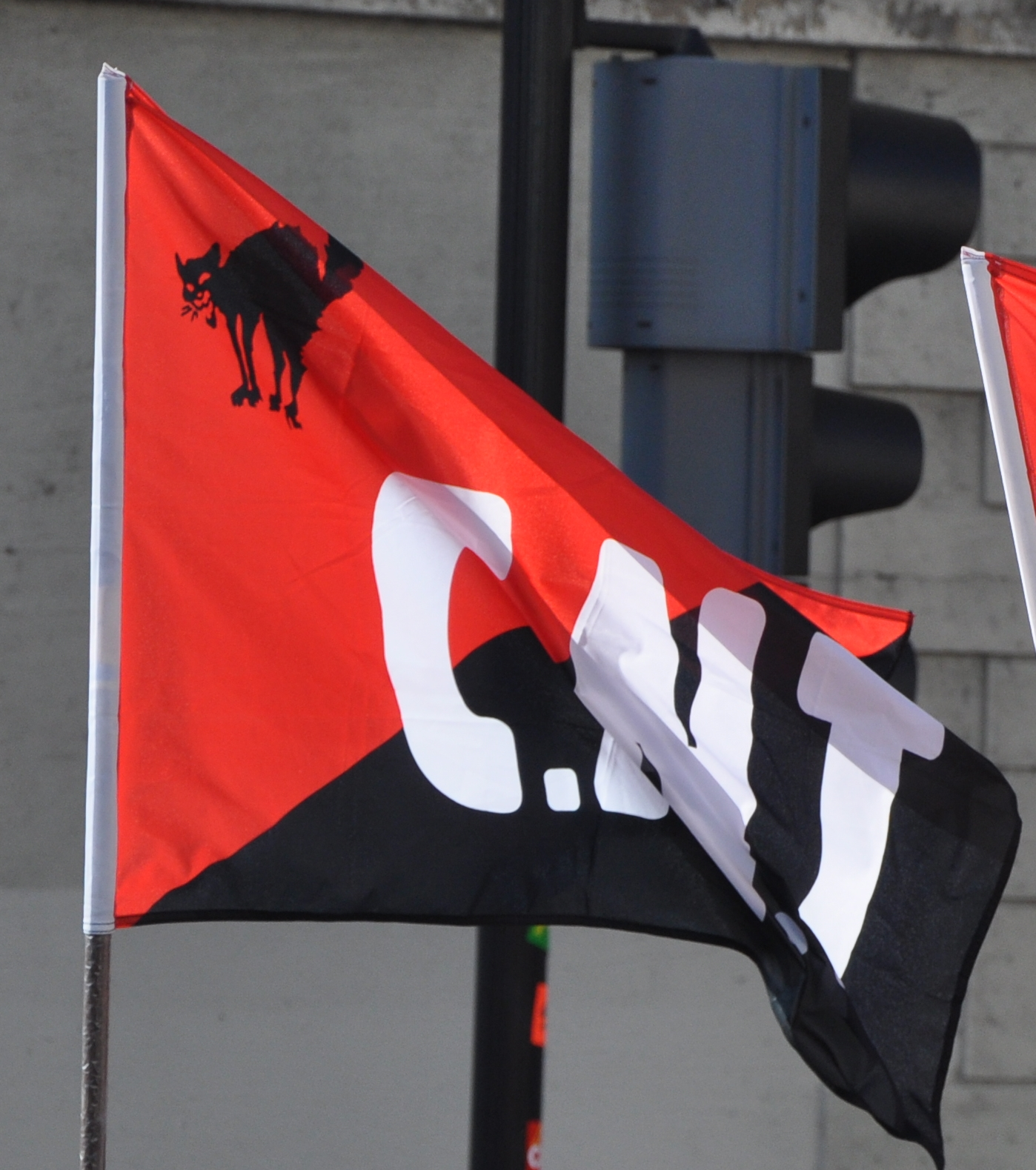
The CNT has represented anarcho-syndicalist and revolutionary syndicalist movements since 1946.

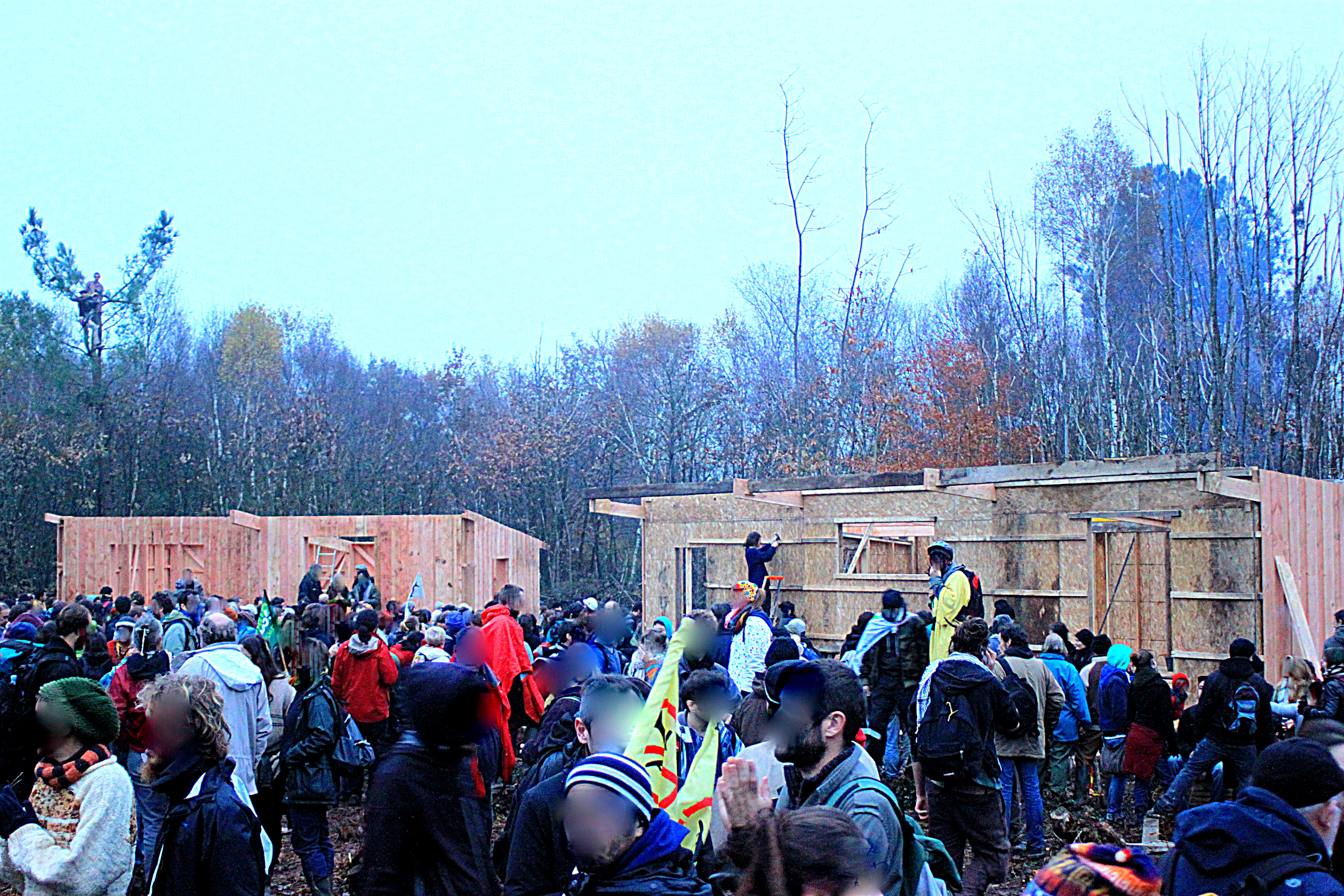
The ZAD de Notre-Dame-des-Landes in 2012

In France, far-left politics (French: politique d'extrême gauche) includes a variety of political traditions, such as revolutionary socialism, anarchism, Maoism, and Trotskyism. Historically, the far-left has distinguished itself by opposing the reformist left represented by the French Communist Party (PCF) and the French Section of the Workers' International (SFIO), advocating instead for the overthrow of capitalism and the establishment of a classless and egalitarian society.

== History ==
=== Origins ===
The roots of the far-left in France can be traced back to the French Revolution (1789–1799), particularly to the ideas of Gracchus Babeuf and the "Conspiracy of the Equals" in 1796. Babeuf envisioned a classless society and sought to overthrow the French Directory to achieve "perfect equality". His vision laid the groundwork for modern communist and socialist ideologies. The ideas of this movement were later reflected in the Manifesto of the Equals, co-authored by Babeuf and Sylvain Maréchal.

=== 19th century ===
During the 19th century, far-left ideas evolved through various revolutionary movements. Early socialists and communists emerged within republican circles opposed to the Bourbon Restoration and the rise of Napoleon III. Thinkers such as Pierre-Joseph Proudhon and Karl Marx began to influence the ideological underpinnings of the far-left. The revolutionary fervor culminated in the Paris Commune of 1871, which became a defining moment for the far-left. The Paris Commune—a radical socialist and revolutionary government—served as a model for future far-left movements, emphasizing workers' control and direct democracy.

=== Early 20th century ===
The Russian Revolution of 1917 had a profound impact on the French far-left. The establishment of the Third International inspired the creation of the PCF (PCF) in 1920; however, some revolutionary socialists rejected the authoritarianism of the Soviet Union, leading to the emergence of various Trotskyist, anarchist, and left-communist currents. The interwar years also saw the rise of syndicalism and anarcho-syndicalism, with the CGT-SR playing a key role. These groups emphasized direct action and workers' autonomy, contrasting with the centralized structure of the PCF.

=== Post-World War II ===
After 1945, the far-left gained renewed momentum. The PCF became a dominant force in French politics, but its alignment with Soviet policies led to criticism from other revolutionary groups. The Fédération Anarchiste (FA) and Trotskyist organizations like the Parti Communiste Internationaliste (PCI) expanded their activities. In the 1960s, the New Left emerged, driven by anti-colonial movements and opposition to the Vietnam War. Groups such as the Ligue Communiste Révolutionnaire (LCR) and Lutte Ouvrière (LO) gained prominence, advocating for workers' councils and anti-capitalist struggle.

=== 1968 and its aftermath ===
The May 1968 protests marked a watershed moment for the far-left. Students and workers united in strikes and demonstrations, challenging both capitalism and traditional political structures. The protests inspired a wave of activism, leading to the growth of Maoist and autonomist Marxist groups. The Gauche Prolétarienne (GP), a Maoist organization, and the Union des Jeunesses Communistes Marxistes-Léninistes (UJCML) played pivotal roles; however, state repression and internal divisions eventually led to their decline.

=== Late 20th century ===
The decline of Soviet Communism in the 1980s forced far-left groups to adapt. The Parti des Travailleurs (PT) emerged from the Trotskyist tradition, while anarchist groups like Alternative Libertaire gained influence within social movements. The rise of the alter-globalization movement in the 1990s, exemplified by protests against the World Trade Organization (WTO), provided new opportunities for the far-left to organize. Groups such as ATTAC and Ras l'Front focused on anti-capitalist and anti-fascist activism.

=== 21st century ===
The far-left has continued to play a significant role in French politics and social movements. The Nouveau Parti Anticapitaliste (NPA), founded in 2009, sought to unite anti-capitalist forces. Figures like Olivier Besancenot and Philippe Poutou became prominent voices for the movement. The 2010s have seen the rise of autonomist activism, including the ZAD de Notre-Dame-des-Landes and Black Bloc tactics during protests. The far-left also played a role in the Gilets Jaunes movement, emphasizing direct democracy and anti-austerity policies.

== Key movements and organizations ==
=== Trotskyism ===
- Trotskyism in France
- Lutte Ouvrière (LO)
- Nouveau Parti Anticapitaliste (NPA)
- Parti Ouvrier Indépendant (POI)
- Révolution Permanente (RP)

=== Anarchism ===
- Fédération Anarchiste (FA)
- Union Communiste Libertaire (UCL)
- Confédération Nationale du Travail (CNT)

== Current challenges and prospects ==
The far-left in France faces challenges such as internal fragmentation, declining membership, and competition from other left-wing movements like La France Insoumise (LFI); however, its influence remains significant in social movements, labor strikes, and grassroots activism. As global issues like climate change and inequality persist, the far-left continues to adapt its strategies to address contemporary challenges.

== See also ==
- Anarchism in France
- History of socialism in France
- List of far-left parties and movements
- Maoism in France
- May 1968 events in France
- Trotskyism in France
- Far-left politics in the United Kingdom

== Works cited ==
- Cosseron, Serge [in French] (2007). Dictionnaire de l'extrême gauche [Dictionary of the extreme left] (in French). Larousse.
- Piot, Olivier [in French] (2008). L'Extrême gauche [The extreme left] (in French).
