= Internationalist Communist Organisation =

Defunct Trotskyist party in France

The Internationalist Communist Organisation (French: Organisation Communiste Internationaliste, OCI) was a Trotskyist political party in France. Its successor was the Internationalist Communist Current (Courant communiste internationaliste) of the Workers Party.

== History ==
=== Origins ===
The group's origins lay in the Internationalist Communist Party (PCI), the French section of the Fourth International. In 1952, the Fourth International removed the Central Committee of the PCI, and replaced it with one built around Michèle Mestre and Pierre Frank, who were more favourable to the International's policies. This led the majority of the PCI to form a new organisation, also known as the Internationalist Communist Party, and led by Pierre Lambert and Marcel Bleibtreu.

In 1953, the Fourth International suffered a major split, and the Socialist Workers Party of the United States, the British group The Club and some smaller groups forming the International Committee of the Fourth International, with Lambert's PCI.

The PCI supported the FLN during the Algerian War of Independence. Disagreements over which faction to support led Lambert to expel Bleibtreu from the PCI in 1955.

Future Prime Minister of France, Lionel Jospin, joined the group in 1960 and remained an active member for over ten years.

=== 1960s and 1970s ===
In 1967, the PCI renamed itself the "Internationalist Communist Organisation". It grew rapidly during the May 1968 student demonstrations, but was banned alongside other far left groups, such as the Gauche prolétarienne (Proletarian Left). Members temporarily reconstituted the group as the Trotskyist Organisation, but soon obtained a state order permitting the reformation of the OCI. By 1970, the OCI was able to organise a 10,000-strong youth rally. The group also gained a strong base in trade unions.

The majority of the International Committee of the Fourth International (ICFI) joined the reunified Fourth International in 1963, leaving the OCI and the British Socialist Labour League as the only two sections continuing the ICFI. Despite attempts to expand the ICFI, the two sides developed opposing policies on many issues, including Arab nationalism - the OCI adopting a dual defeatist position in the Six-Day War.

The OCI left the ICFI in 1971, the Socialist Labour League accusing it of fetishing Trotsky's Transitional Programme over Marxist theory. It set up a new group, the Organising Committee for the Reconstruction of the Fourth International, with some supporters the following year.

=== Internationalist Communist Party ===
In 1981, the OCI again renamed itself as the "Internationalist Communist Party". In 1984, it formed a Movement for a Workers Party, with various independent socialists. However, Stephane Just opposed this new initiative, and was expelled with some supporters. Further splits ensued: in 1986, several hundred members, led by Jean-Christophe Cambadélis, left to join the Socialist Party. In 1989, historian Pierre Broué was expelled, with around one hundred supporters.

=== Internationalist Communist Current ===
In 1991, the Movement for a Workers Party declared itself the Workers Party and the Internationalist Communist Party joined it as the Internationalist Communist Current. Dissenting members including Andre Langevin, Pedro Carrasquedo and Alexis Corbière were expelled by 1992, and the Current has since occupied a leading role in the Workers Party. Its central figure is Daniel Gluckstein, although Lambert remained a member until his death in 2008.
