= Yvan Craipeau =

French Trotskyist activist

Yvan Craipeau (French: [kʁɛpo]; 24 September 1911 – 13 December 2001) was a French Trotskyist activist.

== Biography ==
Born in La Roche-sur-Yon, he helped found a local independent Marxist organisation while he was still in his teens. Expelled from school, he moved to Paris and became associated with the Trotskyist group around La Verité. In 1930, the group founded the Communist League. It considered itself an external faction of the Communist Party of France and so admitted current and former members of the French Communist Party. However, the rule was relaxed, and Craipeau was allowed to join in 1931. He joined the League's executive committee with the responsibility for developing a youth wing.

By 1933, he was able to organise a meeting attended by 1000 members of the youth wings of the Communist Party and the Section française de l'Internationale ouvrière. In 1933, he was Trotsky's personal secretary.

In 1936, Craipeau became a leading member of the new Internationalist Workers Party (POI). The following year, in reaction to Trotsky's The Revolution Betrayed, he began a re-analysis of the nature of the Soviet Union. He concluded that it could not be defended, as Trotsky held, as a degenerated workers' state but that it was a bureaucratic collectivist system, an idea that he introduced to Trotskyism.

During World War II, he was pronounced unfit for duty, and attempted, with Marcel Hic, to publish La Verité secretly. This was difficult, and following a series of setbacks, he turned instead to work influencing the German Army. He wrote an account of this activity in his books Contre vents et marées and La Libération Confisquée. The former work, on the Occupation period itself, was published in English in 2013.

In 1944, Craipeau was the architect of unity between three of France's four Trotskyist groups: the POI itself, the Comités Communistes Internationalistes and the Octobre group. They formed the Internationalist Communist Party, and in 1946, he was elected its General Secretary. In the same year, he was also elevated to the International Secretariat of the Fourth International. However, he could not agree with the International's perspective that a crisis in capitalism was imminent, and soon after the POI sided with the International, he was expelled.

Craipeau temporarily withdrew from politics, and in 1951, he moved to Basse-Terre in Guadeloupe, where he became a school teacher and soon secretary of the National Education Federation trade union.

In 1954, Craipeau returned to mainland France, where he participated in the creation of the New Left. This fused with the Movement for the Liberation of the City to form the Union of the Socialist Left (UGS) and, in 1960 with several groups to form the Unified Socialist Party (PSU). He remained a leading member of this party for many years, during which he wrote numerous books on left-wing politics and revolution.

He died in Paris.

== Works ==
- Swimming against the Tide: Trotskyists in German-occupied France, Merlin, London, 2013. Translation and introduction by David Broder, with a documentary appendix.
