= Union of the Socialist Left =

French political alliance

The Union of the Socialist Left (French: Union de la gauche socialiste, UGS) was a French movement of left-wing activists, founded on 7–8 December 1957 by dissidents from the French Section of the Workers' International (SFIO); former members of the French Resistance, until then close to the Communist Party; social Christian trade-unionists (Ligue de la jeune République and the minority of the Confédération Française des Travailleurs Chrétiens (CFTC)). It was the first alliance between social Christians and Marxists. The UGS merged with the Autonomous Socialist Party in 1960 to form the Unified Socialist Party (PSU).

== Notable members ==
- Yvan Craipeau
- Jean Maitron
- Claude Bourdet
- Hubert Beuve-Méry

== See also ==
- Unified Socialist Party (France)
- LIP
- French Fourth Republic
- French Fifth Republic
