= Internationalist Communist Party (France) =

Internationalist Communist Party Parti Communiste Internationaliste
- Abbreviation: PCI
- General Secretary: Yvan Craipeau
- Founded: March 1944
- Dissolved: June 12, 1968
- Merger of: Internationalist Workers Party; Internationalist Communist Committee; October Group
- Succeeded by: Communist League; Internationalist Communist Organisation
- Membership: 1,000
- Ideology: Trotskyism; Communism
- Political position: Far-left
- International affiliation: Fourth International

The Internationalist Communist Party (French: Parti Communiste Internationaliste, PCI) was a Trotskyist political party in France. It was the name taken by the French Section of the Fourth International from its foundation until a name change in the late 1960s.

== Creation ==
The Internationalist Communist Party was created in March 1944 by the merger of several Trotskyist groups, representing around 500 militants, in particular:

- the Internationalist Workers Party of Yvan Craipeau, Roumain Spoulber and Marcel Gibelin;
- the Internationalist Communist Committee of Rodolphe Prager and Jacques Grinblat, alias Privas;
- the October Group of Henri Molinier, Raymond Molinier's brother.

The negotiations were prepared by the Greek Michel Raptis, alias "Pablo".

The UCI (Union Communiste Internationaliste, or Barta Group) refused to merge with the other Trotskyists, and later gave birth to Lutte Ouvrière.

The name chosen, Internationalist Communist Party, took up that of a French Trotskyist party created by Raymond Molinier and Pierre Frank in March 1936, which published the newspaper La Commune. This party had opposed the "official" section (recognized by Leon Trotsky), the Internationalist Workers Party of Jean Rous and Yvan Craipeau and had been described by the Trotskyist press as "anti-Trotskyist". Pierre Lambert was one of its militants from 1937. This small group had an ephemeral existence, effectively disappearing at the start of World War II. However, in May 1942, a representative of the Paris section met in the free zone members of the group of Austrian Communist Revolutionaries in exile in France.

== Splits and departures ==
Following the Liberation of France, the PCI had expectations of rapid growth and for a time did expand, but that growth was soon ended when a majority of the organisation broke away when a projected fusion with the Socialist Youth federation of the Seine failed to materialise. The PCI very quickly found subjects of tension around the role of the new party and on the nature of the Soviet Union. It underwent several splits during its history, sometimes in the form of simple departures of personalities.

=== The 1945 split: David Rousset joins Sartre ===
In 1945, David Rousset left the PCI to form with Jean-Paul Sartre, in 1948, the Revolutionary Democratic Rally (RDR).

=== The 1947 split: Castoriadis and Lefort ===
In 1947, the Socialism or Barbarism tendency (Cornelius Castoriadis, Claude Lefort) left the party to move towards councilist positions, considering the Soviet Union to be state capitalist and not as a "degenerated workers' state" (a strategic question in the report to the French Communist Party).

=== The 1948 split: Yvan Craipeau ===
In 1948, Yvan Craipeau's tendency was excluded. The latter would later become president of the Federation of the Alpes-Maritimes of the PSU, other members of this tendency such as Jean-René Chauvin, joined the RDR and were excluded on the grounds of this dual membership.

=== The 1952 split ===
In 1952, the majority was excluded from the PCI by the minority of Pierre Frank and Michèle Mestre: these militants refused entry into the interior of the Stalinist parties, then advocated by the Fourth International which considered that the victory of the Stalinist bureaucracy was imminent. The small party then split into two rival groups both of which continued to use the same name.

1. The official PCI supported the International Secretariat of the Fourth International, and became the French section of the reunified Fourth International in 1963. Its leaders included Pierre Frank. It merged in 1969 with the Revolutionary Communist Youth (JCR) to become the Ligue Communiste, which was re-established in 1974 as the Revolutionary Communist League.
2. The other PCI supported the International Committee of the Fourth International until 1971. It was led by Pierre Lambert. In 1967, that organisation renamed itself the Internationalist Communist Organisation (OCI).

== Activities ==
From 1945, the PCI infiltrated the Socialist Youth (JS), where young people from the PCI and the JS did joint training courses and camps in 1945-47. Together, they took control of the Youth Hostels (40,000 members at the time). Yvan Craipeau, PCI executive who sent André Essel, future CEO of Fnac, to the JS, then held “fraction meetings” with all of the JS management and 3 of the 12 members of the SFIO management (including Deputy National Secretary Yves Dechézelles). In addition to Dechézelles, Adrien Tixier, chief of staff to the Minister of the Interior, Robert Pontillon (near future of Mitterrand), Roger Fajardie (future leader of FO and the Grand Orient de France), Max Théret (friend of Mitterrand and co-founder of the Fnac) and Jean Rous were among the socialists close to the PCI.

Having come out of hiding at the end of 1945, the PCI presented candidates in 11 departments during the June 1946 French legislative election, gaining between 2 and 5% of the vote, although Yvan Craipeau failed to be elected by a few hundred votes in Taverny (Val-d'Oise).

After 1952, the PCI had around 200 activists, mainly intellectuals (Maurice Nadeau, Laurent Schwartz, Félix Guattari, etc.). However, it was joined from 1956 by PCF activists from the “La Voie communiste” group (which included Félix Guattari, by entryism) following the publication of the Krushchev report, the Hungarian Revolution, and the worsening of the Algerian War.

The PCI invested itself mainly in anti-colonial struggles by supporting the independence of Algeria, the Cuban Revolution and the Vietnam liberation movement, as well as by its critical support for Josip Broz Tito during the Yugoslav-Soviet split.

It was also organized within the Union of Communist Students (UEC), then created the Revolutionary Communist Youth (JCR) in 1966, around Alain Krivine (member of the PCI since 1960).

== Dissolution ==
Active with the student movement in May 68, the PCI was dissolved by the government on June 12, 1968 at the same time as the JCR. But at the beginning of June 1968, the PCI began to prepare the merger with the JCR, and in 1969, the two other organizations became the Communist League. This was then dissolved in 1973 by the Minister of the Interior Raymond Marcellin following an attack on a New Order meeting, before re-forming under the name of the Revolutionary Communist League (LCR) in 1974.

== See also ==
- Communist Party (British Section of the Third International)
- Communist Party (French Section of the Communist International) of the Region of Madagascar
- Communist Party of Spain (international) (1975)
- International Communist Party
- International Communist Party (Dominican Republic)
- Internationalist Communist Party (Italy)
- Revolutionary Communist Party of Argentina
- International Communist League (Vietnam)
- Trotskyism in France
