= New Left in France =

The New Left (French: Nouvelle Gauche) in France was an organized caucus in the French Socialist Party. It was founded in 1993 by Benoît Hamon and Jean-Patrick Gille within the PS' youth movement, the MJS. It was considered close to Michel Rocard and often cited to be the Christian left of the party. There is close relationship between the New Left movement in France and around the world.

The New Left became an integral part of the New Socialist Party.
