= Marcel Bleibtreu =

Marcel Bleibtreu (August 26, 1918 – December 25, 2001) was a French Trotskyist activist and theorist.

== Biography ==
Marcel Bleibtreu was born in 1918 during his family's refuge in Marseille from wartime bombing. Bleibtreu became a radical thinker as a child. After studies at the Lycée Condorcet, he studied medicine in Paris, and graduated in 1947. He joined the Groupe Bolchevik Léniniste, the Trotskyist organisation, in September 1936. By 1944 the GBL had merged with two other Trotskyist currents to form the Internationalist Communist Party, (PCI), the French section of the Fourth International. Bleibtreu led workplace cells of the PCI around Puteaux-Suresnes-Nanterre under the pen-name Pierre Favre. In November 1944, he became an editor of the party's journal, La Vérité. He was named general secretary of the PCI in 1946, and led the party's growth after its post-war legalisation.

In 1952 he and Pierre Lambert played a key role in the split in the PCI with a minority composed of co-thinkers of Michel Pablo.

In 1954 the Algerian War of Independence escalated. The PCI naturally supported independence. However, Lambert and Bleibtreu started to disagree over tactics in Algeria. Lambert supported the MTLD of Messali Hadj while others, along with Bleibtreu, supported CRUA (the forerunner of the FLN). Lambert was able to win a majority in 1955, expelling Bleibtreu and its comrades. The expelled group again took the name Groupe Bolchévik-Leninist and published the journal Trotskysme. The GBL later joined the New Left, within which Bleibtreu created the Revolutionary Socialist Tendency, a founder member of the UGS and the PSU. Bleibtreu became a member of the political committee of the PSU, then also its general secretary until he left that party in 1964.

Bleibtreu's militancy extended to art as well. He organised in Paris, in 1967, an exhibition named "Art for Peace to Vietnam", a method which he would use again, in 1993, in Athens against the embargo in Iraq.

Bleibtreu supported the development and the coordination of the 'Base Committees' in 1968, endeavouring to reduce the disagreements between the Trotskyist groups, from where his nickname of "Jean XXIII of Trotskyism" comes, following a famous appeal he made in the large lecture theatre of the Sorbonne. Bleibtreu was a militant in various associations, in particular in S.O.S. Children of the South, and the coordination for the lifting of the embargo imposed on Iraq, which he directed.

He died in 2001 in Villejuif.
