= David Rousset =

French writer and political activist

- Born: 18 January 1912; Roanne, Loire, France
- Died: 30 December 1997 (aged 85)

David Rousset (18 January 1912 in Roanne, Loire – 13 December 1997) was a French writer and political activist, a recipient of Prix Renaudot, a French literary award. A survivor of the Neuengamme concentration camp and the Buchenwald Nazi concentration camp, he is famous for his books about concentration camps.

Rousset was the first person to use the term "Gulag" in the French language, revealing to the French the Soviet system of labour camps. In 1949, learning that while the concentration camps in Nazi Germany had been destroyed, camps still existed in the Soviet Union, he appealed to former inmates of Nazi German camps to form a commission to inspect the USSR camps, which became the "International Commission Against Concentrationist Regimes".

For his efforts he was attacked by Pierre Daix in the French communist newspaper Les Lettres Françaises, which accused him of slandering the Soviet Union, forging the texts of the Soviet laws, and spreading misinformation. Rousset brought libel charges against the newspaper, and in 1951 he won the case.

Along with Jean-Paul Sartre, Albert Camus and Gerard Rosenthal, Rousset was a founder of the left-wing Rassemblement démocratique révolutionnaire (Revolutionary Democratic Rally), which called for a European federation on democratic socialist lines.

In 1968 he was elected as a deputy to the French National Assembly as a left-wing Gaullist. He resigned in November 1970.

== Bibliography ==
- The Other Kingdom (Reynal & Hitchcock Inc., 1947)
- Rousset, David (1951) [1st pub. Editions du Pavois:1946]. A World Apart. Translated by Moyse, Yvonne; Senhouse, Roger. London: Secker and Warburg. from L'Univers concentrationnaire (French)
- "The Drama of Political Confrontation", Telos 44 (Summer 1980). New York: Telos Press.
- Legacy of the Bolshevik Revolution: A Critical History of the USSR, Volume 1 (translated by Alan Freeman; London: Allison & Busby, 1982)
- The Crisis in the Soviet System (1986)
- Bibliography of the Holocaust § Early Reports
