= Pierre Lambert =

French Trotskyist leader

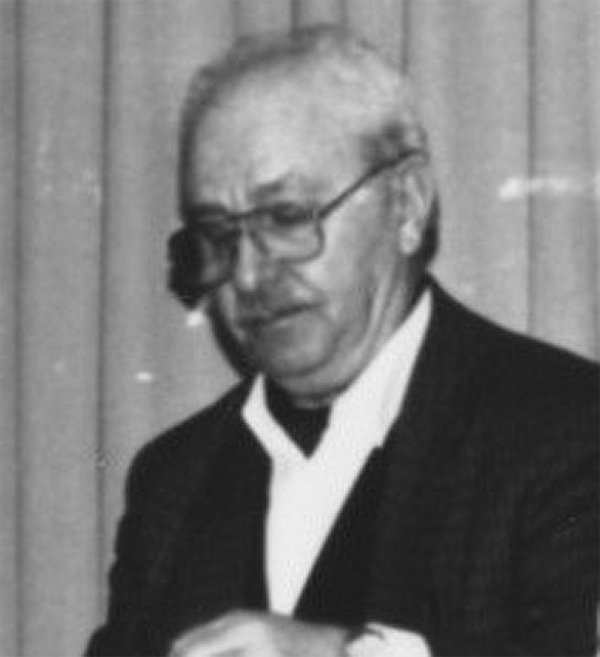
Pierre Lambert in 1988 in the city of Montpellier

Pierre Lambert (French: [pjɛʁ lɑ̃bɛʁ]; real name Pierre Boussel [pjɛʁ busɛl]; June 9, 1920 – January 16, 2008) was a French Trotskyist leader, who for many years acted as the central leader of the French Courant Communiste Internationaliste (CCI) which founded the Parti des Travailleurs.

== Biography ==
He was born in Paris to a family of Russian Jewish immigrants. Lambert began his activity as a Trotskyist militant before the Second World War when he was a member of the Internationalist Workers Party (POI) led by Raymond Molinier. After the war he continued his activism, as a member of the now united French section of the Fourth International, the Internationalist Communist Party (PCI).

In the PCI he was known as a specialist in trade union matters. When Michel Pablo, the secretary of the Fourth International, raised the question of entrism sui generis he eventually came to oppose this and helped to challenge Pablo within the French Section of the FI, backing the PCI leadership around Marcel Bleibtreu (also known as Pierre Favre).

Differences between Lambert and Bleibtreu forced the latter to leave the PCI. By this time, 1952, the PCI had split into two mutually hostile groups on the question of entrism sui generis and the associated perspective of hundreds of years of deformed workers states propagated by Pablo.

As leader of the PCI by 1954 Lambert forged an alliance with the Socialist Workers Party in the United States and others opposed to Pablo. Lambert lead the PCI to join with these anti-Pabloist fores to form the International Committee of the Fourth International (ICFI). This alliance would last for nearly a decade at which point the SWP (US) and its international faction fused with the International Secretariat of the Fourth International, within which Pablo was now marginalised, to form the United Secretariat of the Fourth International.

Lambert was left in 1963 to continue the ICFI in an alliance with the Gerry Healy-led Socialist Labour League, based in Britain. The much shrunken ICFI consisted at this point of the SLL, Lambert's Organisation Communiste Internationaliste (the PCI as rebranded in 1966) and smaller groups around Europe and Latin America, most notably the POR in Bolivia led by Guillermo Lora and the Politica Obrera group in Argentina led by Jorge Altamira. By the time of the ICFI's congress in 1966, pressures were building between the OCI (which thought the SLL to be "ultimatistic") and the SLL. In 1971 the OCI left the ICFI to form the Organising Committee for the Reconstruction of the Fourth International and in 1973 and 1974 proposed discussions to the USFI. This was supported by the US SWP but the Nicaraguan Revolution intervened in 1979 and instead the OCRFI eventually united with Nahuel Moreno's group to form the Parity Committee for the Reconstruction of the Fourth International. The parity commission failed, leaving Lambert's supporters organised in the Fourth International (ICR). In 1996 the Fourth International (ICR) reproclaimed the Fourth International and goes by that name since.

Under his real name of Pierre Boussel, Lambert was candidate at the presidential election in 1988. He gathered 116,823 votes (0.39% of validly cast ballots).

Lambert died on January 16, 2008 in Paris.
