= The Transitional Program =

Political manifesto by Leon Trotsky

The Transitional Program, originally titled The Death Agony of Capitalism and the Tasks of the Fourth International and later reprinted under the title, The Transitional Program and the Struggle for Socialism, is a political platform adopted by the 1938 founding congress of the Fourth International, the international Leninist organization founded by Leon Trotsky. It is an example of a transitional programme.

== Intent ==
The "transitional" idea of this program, roughly, is the following. The working class is not acquainted with the necessity of embracing the revolutionary ideas of the Fourth International due to "the confusion and disappointment of the older generation, the inexperience of the younger generation". Hence

It is necessary to help the masses in the process of the daily struggle to find the bridge between present demand and the socialist program of the revolution. This bridge should include a system of transitional demands, stemming from today’s conditions and from today’s consciousness of wide layers of the working class and unalterably leading to one final conclusion: the conquest of power by the proletariat. Classical Social Democracy, functioning in an epoch of progressive capitalism, divided its program into two parts independent of each other: the minimum program which limited itself to reforms within the framework of bourgeois society, and the maximum program which promised substitution of socialism for capitalism in the indefinite future. Between the minimum and the maximum program no bridge existed. And indeed Social Democracy has no need of such a bridge, since the word socialism is used only for holiday speechifying.

— The Death Agony of Capitalism and the Tasks of the Fourth International

The problem lay in the fact that the "epoch of progressive capitalism" had ended in the prior period. This meant that "every serious demand of the proletariat" reached beyond the limits of what the capitalist and the bourgeois state were prepared to willingly give.

The old "minimum" demands had been raised by reformists on the understanding that they were acceptable to an expanding capitalism, and had been dropped when they were not. The Fourth International, Trotsky writes, does not discard the program of the old “minimal” demands "to the degree to which these have preserved at least part of their vital forcefulness." Trotskyists should indefatigably defend "the democratic rights and social conquests of the workers".

But in addition, transitional demands include the call for "employment and decent living conditions for all" and reach beyond what the capitalists will willingly give, challenging the "very basis of the bourgeois regime." Demands such as higher wages are not impossible demands in themselves, Trotsky argues, but capitalism in crisis demands lower wages in the hope of increasing profitability. Transitional demands therefore do not draw back in the face of the contingencies of capitalist economics, but on the contrary, it is proposed, they continually challenge the logic of the capitalist system, expose it in the eyes of the workers, and thus help them draw towards a fully rounded out socialist consciousness - an acceptance and adoption of the "maximum programme" which the socialist leaders kept for their holiday speechifying, as an immediate and realistic necessity.

By fighting for these "transitional" demands, in the opinion of the Trotskyists, the workers will come to realize that capitalism cannot meet their needs, and they will then embrace the full program of the Fourth International.

=== Crisis of leadership ===
Crisis of leadership is a term used by Trotskyists to describe the fundamental problem holding back the working class from political power in the epoch of imperialism. Trotsky argued that only Stalinists, centrists and reformists who hold the leadership of the class and its vanguard hold back the working class from political power when capitalism has reached the point that it is ready for socialism.

This is shown in a quote from The Transitional Program:

"All talk to the effect that historical conditions have not yet 'ripened' for socialism is the product of ignorance or conscious deception. The objective prerequisites for the proletarian revolution have not only 'ripened'; they have begun to get somewhat rotten. Without a socialist revolution, in the next historical period at that, a catastrophe threatens the whole culture of mankind. The turn is now to the proletariat, i.e., chiefly to its revolutionary vanguard. The historical crisis of mankind is reduced to the crisis of the revolutionary leadership."

The importance of this today is the different positions held by Trotskyist groups on this question - indicating their views on programme and epoch.

== Proposals ==
In the face of high unemployment and high prices (meaning, in particular, inflation) the Transitional Programme raises slogans such as a "sliding scale of wages". This means demanding a contract with the employers which ensures that if prices go up then wages (or salaries) go up by the same extent, i.e. that wages are permanently "inflation proofed". This demand was won by the Italian workers in 1945-46 (the scala mobile), who fought to keep it until it was given up in the early 1990s.

Alongside "public works" - meaning a programme of creating public amenities (health care, housing, education etc.) - a reduction in hours is also proposed for those in work, without loss of pay, so that unemployment will be reduced as more workers will have to be taken on to maintain production:

Against unemployment, “structural” as well as “conjunctural,” the time is ripe to advance along with the slogan of public works, the slogan of a sliding scale of working hours. Trade unions and other mass organizations should bind the workers and the unemployed together in the solidarity of mutual responsibility. On this basis all the work on hand would then be divided among all existing workers in accordance with how the extent of the working week is defined. The average wage of every worker remains the same as it was under the old working week.

— The Death Agony of Capitalism and the Tasks of the Fourth International

This demand also has its historical precedents. For instance, in the period of "new unionism" in UK working class history in 1889, and despite the often desperate conditions of working-class people of the time, Will Thorne, leader of the gas workers in the East End of London, and one time follower of Marxist ideas, won a reduction of hours from 12 hours to 8 hours, on the basis of a successful vote to strike and mass meetings preparatory to the strike. The owners of the gas industry had to move from a two shift system to a three shift system, no doubt at great expense, and the increase in employment of thousands of men was a part of the motivation for Thorne's stubborn insistence in striking for a reduction of hours without loss of pay, rather than wages.

Trotsky urges that transitional demands should include the call for the expropriation of various groups of capitalists - sometimes translated in modern terms into the nationalisation of various sectors (Note: For instance, by the Militant tendency during the 1980s) - under the control and management of the workers. Transitional demands should include opposition to imperialist war. Such demands intend to challenge the capitalist class's right to rule.

In the transitional program, Trotsky also reiterated the need for the legalization of the Soviet parties and worker's control of production.

== Authorship ==
The program was formally proposed to the Congress by the National Committee of the Socialist Workers Party (US). The program was developed through discussions between Leon Trotsky, who did much of the drafting of the document, and leaders of the SWP such as James P. Cannon. Those involved were at pains to ensure that the Program was seen as a document of the FI. However, Trotskyist currents that have departed the Fourth International tend to present the Program as a work authored by Trotsky individually.

== Published editions ==
- The transitional program for socialist revolution. Translated by Eastman, Max (1st ed.). Pathfinder Press. 1973.
- The transitional program for socialist revolution: including The death agony of capitalism and the tasks of the Fourth International. Translated by Eastman, Max (2nd ed.). Pathfinder Press. 1974.
- The transitional program for socialist revolution: including The death agony of capitalism and the tasks of the Fourth International. Translated by Eastman, Max (3rd ed.). Pathfinder Press. 1977. ISBN 978-0-87348-523-4.
- The Transitional Program & the Struggle for Socialism. Resistance Marxist library. Chippendale: Resistance Books. 1999. ISBN 978-0-909196-83-7.
- The transitional program for socialist revolution: including The death agony of capitalism and the tasks of the Fourth International. Translated by Eastman, Max (4th ed.). Pathfinder Press. 2001.
- The transitional program for socialist revolution (in Persian). Talaye Porsoo. 2016. ISBN 978-964-5783-38-7.

== See also ==
- Crisis of Leadership
