= Pierre Naville =

French Surrealist writer and sociologist

- Born: Pierre Louis Pyrame Naville; February 1, 1901; 7th arrondissement of Paris
- Died: April 24, 1993 (aged 89); 6th arrondissement of Paris
- Occupations: Sociologist, writer, politician, psychologist, literary critic, journalist, philosopher
- Known for: Key figure in the Trotskyist movement, co-editor of La Révolution surréaliste, founding father of the Sociology of Work
- Notable work: La Révolution et les intellectuels (1927); Le Nouveau Léviathan (1957–1975); Le Traité de sociologie du travail (1961-1962)
- Political party: French Communist Party; Communist League; French Section of the Workers' International; Revolutionary Workers' Party; Internationalist Workers' Party; Union of the Socialist Left; Unified Socialist Party
- Movement: Surrealism; Trotskism
- Spouse: Denise Naville

Pierre Naville (French: [navil]; 1 February 1904 – 24 April 1993) was a French Surrealist writer and sociologist. He was a prominent member of the "Investigating Sex" group of Surrealist thinkers.

In politics, he was a Marxist-Leninist and then a Trotskyist, before joining the PSU. He led a career as an occupational sociologist.

He was born and died in Paris.

== Early life ==
Naville was born in 1904 to a family of Swiss Protestant bankers.

== Surrealist from its earliest times ==
In 1922 he founded the avant-garde periodical L'œuf dur (The Tough Egg) together with Philippe Soupault, François Gérard, Max Jacob, Louis Aragon and Blaise Cendrars.

He was co-editor with Benjamin Péret for the three first numbers of La Révolution Surréaliste, founded the Bureau de Recherches Surréalistes in (1924 and participated in surrealist activities with André Breton before eventually opposing Surrealism because of his political divergences from the emerging Surrealist orthodoxy.

== Politics ==
In 1926, Naville married fellow surrealist Denise Lévy. That year he joined the French Communist Party (PCF), for which he managed the publication Clarté. He was a member of a delegation that visited Leon Trotsky in Moscow in 1927. He returned convinced by Trotsky's arguments and was expelled from the Communist Party in 1928 for deviationism. From this point onwards, he and his wife participated in the life of the French Trotskyist extreme left and notably its publications. However, he became less and less convinced by Trotsky's position, and broke with the group in 1939. He then organised attempts to create a Marxist left, devoid of Stalinist or Trotskyist trappings, through a publication called the Revue Internationale.

Initially passing through the PSU, Naville continued to search for a modern left in the PSG, then the UGS, before taking part in the re-establishment of the Parti Socialiste Unifié (PSU) under the Fifth Republic. He remained loyal to this party in spite of his opposition to the "realists" (Gilles Martinet, Michel Rocard) and showed total rejection of François Mitterrand.

== Psycho-sociology of work ==
Appointed director of research at the CNRS in 1947, he worked with Georges Friedmann at the Centre d'études sociologiques, dedicating his work to the psychosociology of work, and the study of automation, industrial society, the psychology of comportment, and the strategists and theoreticians of war, notably Carl von Clausewitz. He supervised the French translation and publication of the complete works of Clausewitz.

== Existentialism ==
He was the primary other contributor mentioned at the end of Jean-Paul Sartre's L'existentialisme est un humanisme (Existentialism is a Humanism), criticising existentialism.

== Honours ==
The laboratory of research in social sciences and management at the University of Évry Val d'Essonne bears his name.

== Works ==
=== Surrealist ===
- Les Reines de la main gauche, 1924

=== Political ===
- La Révolution et les Intellectuels, 1926
- Les Jacobins noirs (Toussaint-Louverture et la Révolution de Saint-Domingue) with Cyril Lionel Robert James
- La Guerre du Viêt-Nam, 1949
- Le Nouveau Léviathan, 1957–1975
- Trotsky Vivant, 1962
- Autogestion et Planification, 1980

=== Sociological ===
- De la Guerre, translated from Carl von Clausewitz with Denise Naville and Camille Rougeron
- La Psychologie, science du comportement, 1942
- Psychologie, marxisme, matérialisme, 1948
- La Chine Future, 1952
- La Vie de Travail et ses Problèmes, 1954
- Essai sur la Qualification du Travail, 1956
- Le Traité de Sociologie du Travail, 1961–1962
- L'État entrepreneur: le cas de la régie Renault with Jean-Pierre Bardou, Philippe Brachet and Catherine Lévy, 1971
- Sociologie d'Aujourd'hui, 1981

=== Others ===
- Memoirs (Le Temps du surréel, 1977)
