= International Committee of the Fourth International =

Faction of the Fourth International

- Abbreviation: ICFI
- Founders: Gerry Healy; Pierre Lambert; James P. Cannon
- Founded: November 1953
- Split from: Fourth International
- Merged into: United Secretariat of the Fourth International (majority) (Note: While a majority of sections merged into the USFI in 1963, a minority continued to operate as the ICFI)
- Ideology: Trotskyism

The International Committee of the Fourth International (ICFI) was a political international that was established in 1953. Initially founded as a public faction of the Fourth International, the group withdrew from the Fourth International (referred to by the ICFI as the International Secretariat).

The ICFI split in 1961 with the French Internationalist Communist Party (PCI) and British Socialist Labour League (SLL) continuing the ICFI after the majority of sections reunified in 1963. Further splits occurred in 1971 between the SLL and PCI, and then again in the late-1980s when the SLL (by then called the Workers Revolutionary Party, WRP) collapsed.

Currently, two Trotskyist internationals claim to be the organisers of the ICFI: the orthodox Trotskyist Socialist Equality Party (SEP), a splinter group of the WRP founded in 1986, and Sheila Torrance's Workers Revolutionary Party formed after the collapse of the original WRP.

== History ==
=== 1938-61: The Fourth International and the formation of the ICFI ===
The Fourth International (FI) was founded in 1938 by Leon Trotsky and his followers. The FI had previously been organised as the International Left Opposition since 1923 within the Communist International. Its American section was the Socialist Workers Party (SWP), led by James P. Cannon. Its British section was the Revolutionary Socialist League, which merged with the smaller Workers' International League (WIL) in 1944 to form the Revolutionary Communist Party (RCP). One of the leaders of the WIL was Gerry Healy, who would later split from the RCP to form "the Club", which became the Socialist Labour League, later (from 1973) called Workers Revolutionary Party (WRP). Cannon and Healy were close politically.

On 3-4 October 1953, representatives from The Club, the Internationalist Communist Party, the Swiss section of the FI and a member of the SWP met to form a faction opposing Pabloism and liquidationism. At a meeting on 7-8 November 1953, the US SWP came into conflict with the FI's leadership for expelling a faction within their party, and was criticised in a letter written on 16 November (signed by Michel Pablo, Pierre Frank, and Ernest Mandel) for undermining the unity and principles of the FI.

In the same meeting, the SWP adopted A Letter to Trotskyists Throughout the World. which was then published in The Militant on 16 November 1953. The SWP's letter, which criticised Michel Pablo's leadership and urged sections to demand the removal of him and his allies, was backed by the "Resolution Forming the International Committee" published on 23 November 1953. The resolution had been signed by the sections that had met in October, along with a member from a New Zealand section who was allegedly actually Farrell Dobbs of the US SWP. The resolution officially organised the faction into the International Committee of the Fourth International (ICFI), claiming to represent the majority of Trotskyists in the Fourth International.

In response, the International Executive Committee (IEC) of the Fourth International suspended members in the IEC who signed either declaration or were in leadership roles of supporting organisations. This meeting, held on 26-28 December, also recognised the expelled minorities of the US and UK sections as the legitimate sections and replaced Gerry Healy from his positions in favour of John Lawrence.

Over the following decade, the ICFI referred to the rest of the International as the "International Secretariat of the Fourth International", emphasising its view that the Secretariat did not speak for the International as a whole. While presenting it self as an international, the group did not hold full congresses and was described by Pierre Frank as acting more like a political faction.

In October 1954, the "Comité Latino-americano del Trotskismo Ortodoxo" was formed, a Latin American group within the ICFI which would go on to create the Latin American Secretariat of Orthodox Trotskyism (SLATO) in March 1957. This group would be the basis for the Morenoist tendency of Trotskyism in the 1970s and 1980s.

Following the Hungarian Revolution of 1956, the ICFI published a manifesto in November of the same year supporting the uprising against Stalinism.

A world conference was held in 1958 in Leeds and was led by the SWP's delegates. Latin American delegates complained of the SWP's attitudes towards the ICFI, and their stance on reunification with the International Secretariat.

By 1961 the ICFI had split politically: Lambert’s Internationalist Communist Party (PCI) in France and Healy’s Socialist Labour League (SLL) in Britain argued that a workers' state had not been created in Cuba, putting them at odds with the American SWP and the other organisations in the ICFI. By 1963, the split was also organizational. Each side held a congress at which it claimed to be the majority of the ICFI. On the one hand, the remaining Austrian, Chinese and New Zealand IC groups, which had not already unified, met at a congress with the SWP and voted to take part in the reunification congress. On the other hand, the PCI and SLL called an "International Conference of Trotskyists" to continue the work of the ICFI under their own leadership.

=== 1962-1985: The reunified International and the split on ICFI ===
In 1962 the International Committee and International Secretariat formed a Parity Commission to organise a common World Congress.

At the June 1963 reunification congress held in Italy, the two sections reunified, electing the United Secretariat of the Fourth International (USFI) to replace the former groups. Of the ICFI, it was claimed that the Argentine, Austrian, Canadian, Chilean, Chinese and Japanese sections had joined the ISFI in reunification. The British and French parties in the ICFI did not join this reunified congress, as they believed that Michel Pablo's ideas should be completely rejected before reunification could occur.

The remainder of the ICFI held a conference opposing the USFI in April 1966, hosted in London. This conference also excluded the American Spartacists and Voix Ouvrière while recognising the American Committee for the Fourth International as the American section of the ICFI.

By 1971, the ICFI began collapsing due to disagreements between Gerry Healy and Pierre Lambert. The group met seven times between the early 1970s and 1985, and affiliates numbered maximum 10–12. Conflict arose between the youth groups of the French and British sections over a resolution that the former had proposed and the latter then amended at a youth rally in Essen. Conflict had also arose over the association of the Revolutionary Workers' Party (Bolivia) (POR), led by Guillermo Lora, with the regime of Juan José Torres. The SLL heavily criticised this support, and the American section published an editorial in August 1971 openly criticising these actions. Statements made on 19 September by the OCI section, and on 12 October by the POR, OCI, and Hungarian sections supported the Bolivians and condemned the open attacks made against the POR. This then led to a claimed majority of the ICFI denouncing the OCI in an 24 October statement, and the OCI refusing to recognise this majority in a 24 November statement where it also criticised the actions of the SLL. The ICFI had split by the end of 1971. While the SLL kept the name, the OCI under Pierre Lambert left to create the Organising Committee for the Reconstruction of the Fourth International (CORQI) in July 1972.

=== 1985: after Healy ===
In 1985, Healy was expelled from the WRP. This had come as a result of several allegations of sexual assault made against him.

The WRP collapsed into ten smaller organisations. One faction, under the leadership of Sheila Torrance, retained the name WRP and daily newspaper The News Line. A further split from this, in 1987, was the Healy-loyal Marxist Party, including Vanessa and Corin Redgrave. Both groupuscules maintained small international organisations claiming the name ICFI, the former still extant, the latter moribund by the late 1990s.

In 1986 Dave Hyland broke away from the WRP to form the International Communist Party, which he led until his death in 2013. This group maintained itself as Orthodox Trotskyist, and was backed by the US Workers League National Secretary, David North. This group created their own ICFI, with groups in Australia, Germany, Sri Lanka, the UK, and the USA. In 2016, the group also expanded to France and New Zealand.

This group supported the perspective advanced by ICFI and won the support of a majority of sections of the ICFI to expel the WRP from the organization, deciding that any supporters of theirs among the WRP would have to undergo a reregistration of membership based on recognizing the ICFI's political authority to be readmitted. They argued that “the WRP tended to view the international organization as little more than an adjunct to its own British-based organization”.

In 1995, the International Communist Party renamed itself to the Socialist Equality Party. In 1998, the ICFI launched the World Socialist Web Site. ICFI runs the publishing house Mehring Books, formerly named Labor Publications. In 2006, the Socialist Equality Party relaunched its student movement (the Students for Social Equality) as the International Students for Social Equality (ISSE). In 2012, the SEP renamed the ISSE as the International Youth and Students for Social Equality (IYSSE).

== Sections ==
=== Initial ===
Upon its creation and split from the Fourth International, the ICFI claimed to have the following sections:

- Canada: Revolutionary Workers Party (The RWP split upon joining, the majority remained and the minority left to join the Cooperative Commonwealth Federation)
- France: Internationalist Communist Party – PCI (Founding section, renamed itself to the Internationalist Communist Organisation in 1967)
- Great Britain: The Club (Founding section, known as Socialist Labour League from 1959–1973)
- United States: Socialist Workers Party (Founding section, joined USFI in 1963)

The international also included Chinese, Swiss, and New Zealand sections (the New Zealand delegate who was present at the ICFI's formation was said to be Farrell Dobbs, an American).

=== Post-Reunification ===
Following the reunification of parts of the ICFI and the ISFI in 1963, the international claimed to have the following sections:

- Bolivia: Revolutionary Workers' Party – POR (1969–1979, however the SLL claimed that the POR was never a full member. Remained in CORQI until 1979)
- France: Internationalist Communist Organisation – OCI (Split in 1971, formed CORQI in 1972)
- Great Britain: Socialist Labour League – SLL
- Greece: Disputed (Note: The 1967 Greek counter-coup led to a split within the Greek Internationalist Communist Party. A majority supported terrorism against the regime while a minority did not. The OCI considered both to be "sympathizing groups" instead of members, while the SLL stated that the majority group was a member of the ICFI.)
- Mexico: Liga Obrera Marxista – LOM (1970–)
- United States: Workers League of the United States

== See also ==
- List of Trotskyist internationals

== Notes and References ==
=== Works cited ===
- Alexander, Robert J. (1991). International Trotskyism, 1929–1985: A Documented Analysis of the Movement. Duke University Press. ISBN 978-0-8223-0975-8.
- Kelly, John (2018-03-14). Contemporary Trotskyism: Parties, Sects and Social Movements in Britain. London: Routledge. ISBN 9781315671048.
