= Alfred Rosmer =

American-born French Communist political activist and historian

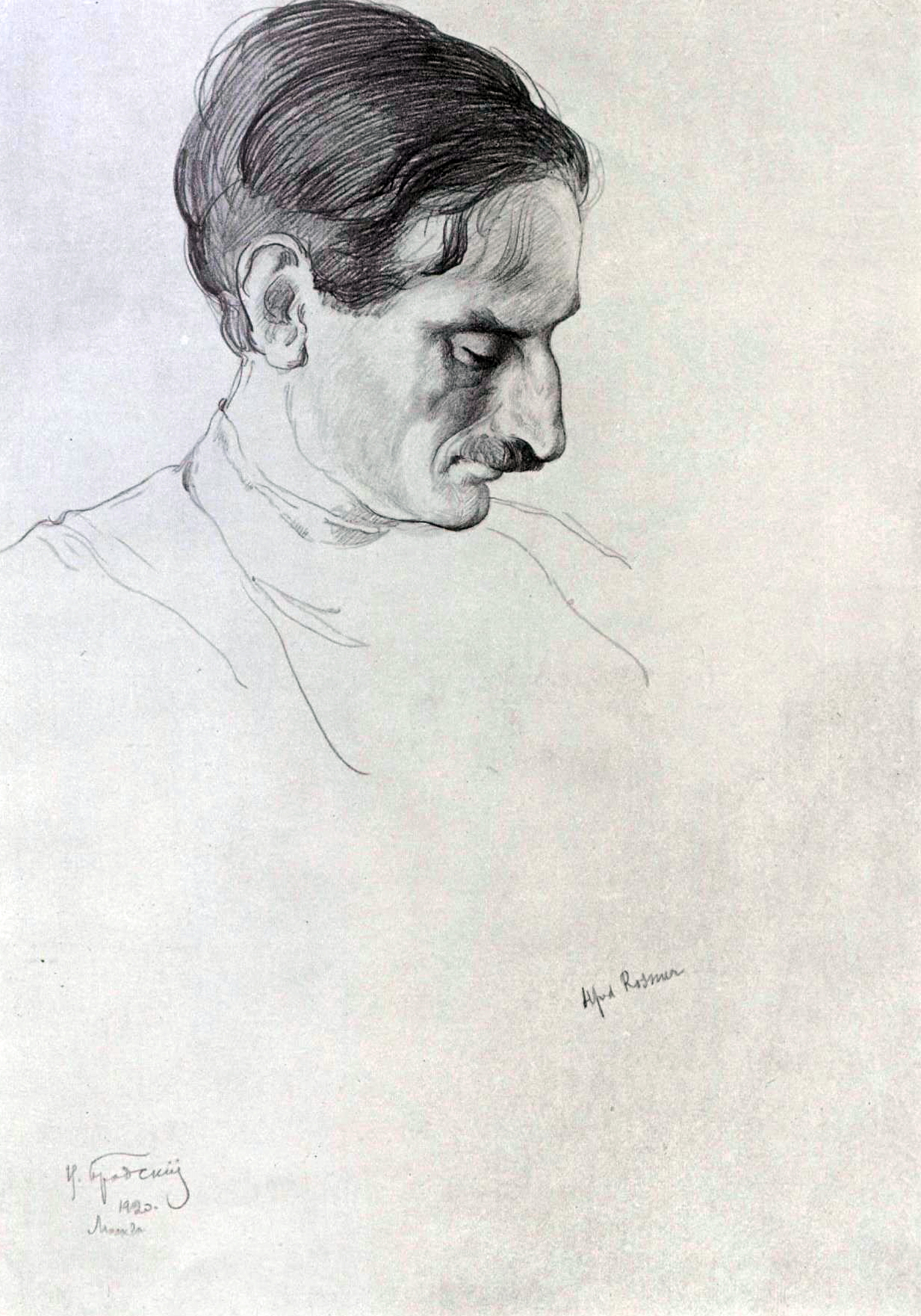
- Portrait of Rosmer by Isaak Brodsky, 1920
- Born: Alfred Griot; 23 August 1877; Paterson, New Jersey, United States
- Died: 6 May 1964 (aged 86); Créteil, Île-de-France, French Fifth Republic
- Spouse: Marguerite
- Writing career
- Period: Modern
- Notable works: Trotsky and the Origins of Trotskyism
- Political party: PCF
- Other political affiliations: CGT, CGTU, Profintern, LC
- Movement: Communism

Alfred Rosmer (born Alfred Griot, 23 August 1877 – 6 May 1964) was an American-born French communist political activist and historian who was a leading member of the Comintern. Rosmer is best remembered as a political associate of Leon Trotsky and a memoirist.

== Early life ==
Alfred Griot was born in 1877 in Paterson, New Jersey. His father worked as a barber in the United States, returning with the family to France in 1884. Having learned English as a child, Rosmer remained fluent in the language for the rest of his life.

== French syndicalist ==
He took the political pseudonym Rosmer from the hero of the play Rosmersholm by Henrik Ibsen.

Rosmer was a syndicalist leader before World War I, active in the General Confederation of Labour (CGT), the French general federation of unions. Together with Pierre Monatte, he issued a journal called La Vie ouvrière (transl. Worker's Life), which was terminated as a result of French entry into World War I.

The antiwar French syndicalists had been represented at the Zimmerwald Conference in 1915 and then organised as the Committee for the Resumption of International Relations in which Rosmer participated. After the end of the war, a strike wave swept France in which the syndicalists played an active role. La Vie ouvrière was resurrected by Rosmer and Monatte in March 1919.

In May 1919, Rosmer and Fernand Loriot transformed the former Committee for the Resumption of International Relations into a new organization, known as the Committee for Adhesion to the Third International. The group remained isolated and without significant influence, however, largely removed from active communication with Moscow.

A friendship with Leon Trotsky dated from that period, when the latter was briefly living in France.

== Communist Party leader ==
After the war, he became a leading figure in the Communist Party of France (PCF). He was sent to Moscow in 1920 as a representative of the French left, being assigned there to positions in the Communist International (Comintern) and the Red International of Labor Unions (RILU).

In 1923 and 1924 Rosmer was one of the top leaders of the PCF, until his expulsion in the fall of 1924 along with Boris Souvarine and Monatte for opposing the organised campaign against Trotsky.

== Trotskyism ==
After his expulsion from the PCF, Rosmer helped found the journal La Révolutuion prolétarienne (transl. The Proletarian Revolution) and participated in political activities in a circle organised around this magazine. He became the only member of the group to establish the first Trotskyist movement in 1929, but he left it in 1931 because of differences over political tactics.

Nevertheless, he remained a convinced revolutionary, and his friendship with Trotsky was later repaired. He visited the exiled Trotsky in Mexico in 1939.

In Mexico, Rosmer was a member of the Dewey Commission, which cleared Trotsky of all charges made during the Moscow Trials.

== Later life ==
Unable to return to France because of the outbreak of World War II, Rosmer, an American by birth, lived in the United States after his Mexican interlude. He finally obtained permission to return home in 1947. Rosmer published an autobiography detailing his activities in Soviet Russia as well as a two-volume history of the antiwar movement in France during the years of World War I.

Rosmer died in 1964 in Créteil.

== Works ==
=== In French ===
- La Conférence de Zimmerwald (The Zimmerwald Conference). Paris: Imp. spéciale de la "Vie ouvrière", 1915.
- Un coup d'oeil en arrière: Pierre Monatte. Lettre de démission au Comité confédéral (décembre 1914). Alfred Rosmer. Première lettre aux abonnés de la "Vie ouvrière" (novembre 1915). La Circulaire de lancement de la "Vie ouvrière" (avril 1919). (A Look Back: Pierre Monatte, Letter of Resignation to the Confederation Committee (Dec. 1914). Alfred Rosmer, First Letter to Subscribes of the "Vie ouvrière." The Circular launching "Vie ouvrière," April 1919.) Paris: Éditions de la Bibliothèque du travail, 1921.
- Le mouvement ouvrier pendant la guerre. (The Labor Movement during the War). In two volumes. Paris: Librairie du travail, 1936. —Reissued as Le mouvement ouvrier pendant la Première guerre mondiale.
- Moscou sous Lenine (Moscow Under Lenin). In two volumes. Paris : Maspero, 1970.

=== English translations ===
- Moscow Under Lenin. New York: Monthly Review Press, 1972. —Reissued as Lenin's Moscow.
- From Syndicalism to Trotskyism: Writings of Alfred and Marguerite Rosmer. With Marguerite Rosmer. London: Porcupine Press/Socialist Platform, 2000.
- Rosmer, Alfred; Souvarine, Boris; Fabrol, Emile; Clavez, Antoine (2001). Richardson, Al (ed.). Trotsky and the Origins of Trotskyism. Francis Boutle Publishers. ISBN 190342707X.
