= Raymond Molinier =

Raymond Molinier (1904–1994) was a leader of the Trotskyist movement in France and a pioneer of the Fourth International.

Molinier was born in Paris. In 1929, founded the journal La Vérité, and in March 1936 he and Pierre Frank co-founded the Parti communiste internationaliste, which merged with two other groups to form the Parti ouvrier internationaliste in June of that year. At the outbreak of World War II Molinier was abroad and only returned after the cessation of hostilities. He was later active with the Ligue communiste révolutionnaire (LCR). Eventually, he moved to Latin America under the name of "Leon Droeven".
