= Fourth International =

Revolutionary socialist international organization

- Abbreviation: FI
- Founder: Leon Trotsky
- Founded: September 3, 1938; 88 years ago
- Dissolved: November 23, 1953; 72 years ago
- Split from: Comintern
- Succeeded by: Split into: International Secretariat of the Fourth International (ISFI); International Committee of the Fourth International (ICFI); 1963 reunification: Fourth International
- Newspaper: Fourth International
- Ideology: Communism; Trotskyism
- Political position: Far-left

The Fourth International (FI) was a political international that existed from 1938 until 1953. The group was first established in France by Leon Trotsky and his supporters, having been expelled from the Soviet Union and the Communist International (also known as Comintern or the Third International).

In The Transitional Program, which was drafted in 1938 during the founding congress of the Fourth International, Trotsky reiterated the need for the legalization of the Soviet parties and worker's control of production.

There is no longer a single, centralized cohesive Fourth International. Throughout most of its existence and history, the Fourth International was hunted by agents of the NKVD, subjected to political repression by countries such as France and the United States, and by supporters of the Soviet Union. The Fourth International struggled to maintain contact under these conditions of crackdowns and repression during World War II due to the fact that subsequent proletarian uprisings were often under the influence of Soviet-aligned pro-Stalin parties and militant nationalist groups, leading to defeats for the Fourth International and the Trotskyists, who subsequently never managed to obtain meaningful influence.

Despite this, many parts of the world, including Latin America, Europe and Asia, continue to have large Trotskyist groupings who are attracted to its anti-Stalinist positions and its defense of proletarian internationalism. Several of these groups carry the label "Fourth Internationalist" either in their organization's name, important political position documents, or both. In line with Trotskyist theory and thought, the Fourth International tended to view the Soviet Union as a degenerated workers' state. However, although it regarded its own ideas as more advanced and thus superior to those of the Third International, it did not actively push for the Comintern's destruction. The current incarnation of the Fourth International does not operate as a cohesive entity in the manner of its predecessors.

The Fourth International suffered a major split in 1940 and an even more significant schism in 1953. A partial reunification of the schismatic factions occurred in 1963, but the organization never recovered sufficiently, and it failed to re-emerge as a single transnational grouping. The response of Trotskyists to such a situation has been in the form of forming multiple Internationals across the world, with some divided over which particular organization represents the true legacy and political continuity of the historical Fourth International.

== History ==
=== International Left Opposition ===
Leon Trotsky founded the International Left Opposition (ILO) in April 1930 as a faction within the Third International. Supporters of the ILO were expelled from the organisation, leading to the faction becoming its own independent group. Trotsky began advocating for the creation of a new international following an August 1933 meeting, and the following month the group became the Internationalist Communist League. The ILO/ICL also attended a meeting of the London Bureau, which led to the signing and publishing of "The Declaration of Four" which reaffirmed the need for the creation of a new international. In July 1936, the Internationalist Communist League was merged into the "Movement for the Fourth International".

=== Founding ===
The founding conference was held on 3 September 1938, in the home of Alfred Rosmer just outside Paris. Present at the meeting were delegates from all the major countries of Europe, and from North America (including three from the United States), although for reasons of cost and distance, few delegates attended from Asia or Latin America. An International Secretariat was established, with many of the day's leading Trotskyists and most countries in which Trotskyists were active represented. Among the resolutions adopted by the conference was the endorsement of Trotsky's Transitional Programme.

The Transitional Programme was the central programmatic statement of the congress, summarising its strategic and tactical conceptions for the revolutionary period that it saw opening up as a result of the war which Trotsky had been predicting for some years. It is not, however, the definitive programme of the Fourth International – as is often suggested – but instead contains a summation of the conjunctural understanding of the movement at that date and a series of transitional policies designed to develop the struggle for workers' power.

=== World War II ===
At the outbreak of World War II, in 1939, the International Secretariat was moved to New York City. The resident International Executive Committee failed to meet, largely because of a struggle within the U.S. Socialist Workers Party (SWP) between Trotsky's supporters and the tendency of Max Shachtman, Martin Abern and James Burnham. The secretariat was composed of those committee members who happened to be in the city, most of whom were co-thinkers of Shachtman. The disagreement centred on the Shachtmanites' disagreements with the SWP's internal policy, and over Trotsky's defence of the USSR as a workers state.

Trotsky opened a public debate with Shachtman and Burnham and developed his positions in a series of polemics written in 1939–1940 and later collected in In Defense of Marxism. Shachtman and Burnham's tendency resigned from the International in early 1940, alongside almost 40% of the SWP's members, many of whom became founder members of the Workers Party.

==== Emergency conference ====
In May 1940, an emergency conference of the International met at a secret location "somewhere in the Western Hemisphere". It adopted a manifesto drafted by Trotsky shortly before his murder and a range of policies on the work of the International, including one calling for the reunification of the then-divided Fourth Internationalist groups in Britain.

Secretariat members who had supported Shachtman were expelled by the emergency conference, with the support of Trotsky himself. While leader of the SWP James P. Cannon later said that he did not believe the split to be definitive and final, the two groups did not reunite. A new International Executive Committee was appointed, which came under the increasing influence of the Socialist Workers Party.

The Fourth International was hit hard during World War II. Trotsky was assassinated, many of the FI's European affiliates were destroyed by the Nazis and several of its Asian affiliates were destroyed by the Empire of Japan. The survivors, in Europe, Asia and elsewhere, were largely cut off from each other and from the International Secretariat. The new secretary, Jean Van Heijenoort (also known as Gerland), was able to do little more than publish articles in the SWP's theoretical journal Fourth International. Despite this dislocation, the various groups sought to maintain links and some connections were kept up throughout the early part of the war by sailors enlisted in the U.S. Navy who had cause to visit Marseille. Contact was steady, if irregular, between the SWP and the British Trotskyists, with the result that the Americans exerted what influence they had to encourage the Workers' International League into the International through a fusion with the Revolutionary Socialist League, a union that had been requested by the Emergency Conference.

In 1942, a debate on the national question in Europe opened up between the majority of the SWP and a movement led by Van Heijenoort, Albert Goldman and Felix Morrow. This minority anticipated that the Nazi dictatorship would be replaced with capitalism rather than by a socialist revolution, leading to the revival of Stalinism and social democracy. In December 1943, they criticised the SWP's view as underestimating the rising prestige of Stalinism and the opportunities for the capitalists to use democratic concessions. The SWP's central committee argued that democratic capitalism could not revive, resulting in either military dictatorship by the capitalists or a workers' revolution. It held that this would reinforce the need for building the Fourth International, and adhered rigidly to their interpretation of Trotsky's works.

==== European Conference ====
The Fourth International magazine

The wartime debate about post-war perspectives was accelerated by the resolution of the February 1944 European Conference of the Fourth International. The conference appointed a new European Secretariat and elected Michel Raptis, a Greek resident in France also known as Michel Pablo, the organisational secretary of its European Bureau. Raptis and other bureau members re-established contact between the Trotskyist parties. The European conference extended the lessons of a revolution then unfolding in Italy, and concluded that a revolutionary wave would cross Europe as the war ended. The SWP had a similar perspective. The British Revolutionary Communist Party (RCP) disagreed and held that capitalism was not about to plunge into massive crisis but rather that an upturn in the economy was already underway. A group of leaders of the French Internationalist Communist Party (PCI) around Yvan Craipeau argued a similar position until they were expelled from the PCI in 1948.

==== International conference ====
In April 1946 delegates from the principal European sections and a number of others attended a "Second International Congress". This set about rebuilding the International Secretariat of the Fourth International with Michel Raptis appointed Secretary and Ernest Mandel, a Belgian, taking a leading role.

Pablo and Mandel aimed to counter the opposition of the majorities inside the British Revolutionary Communist Party and French Internationalist Communist Party. Initially, they encouraged party members to vote out their leaderships. They supported Gerry Healy's opposition in the RCP. In France, they backed elements, including Pierre Frank and Marcel Bleibtreu, opposed to the new leadership of the PCI – albeit for differing reasons.

The Stalinist occupation of Eastern Europe was the issue of prime concern, and it raised many problems of interpretation. At first, the International held that, while the USSR was a degenerated workers' state, the post-World War II East European states were still bourgeois entities, because revolution from above was not possible, and capitalism persisted.

Another issue that needed to be dealt with was the possibility that the economy would revive. This was initially denied by Mandel (who was quickly forced to revise his opinion, and later devoted his PhD dissertation to late capitalism, analysing the unexpected "third age" of capitalist development). Mandel's perspective mirrored uncertainty at that time about the future viability and prospects of capitalism, not just among all Trotskyist groups, but also among leading economists. Paul Samuelson had envisaged in 1943 the probability of a "nightmarish combination of the worst features of inflation and deflation", worrying that "there would be ushered in the greatest period of unemployment and industrial dislocation which any economy has ever faced". Joseph Schumpeter for his part claimed that "[t]he general opinion seems to be that capitalist methods will be unequal to the task of reconstruction". He regarded it as "not open to doubt that the decay of capitalist society is very far advanced".

One of the international's theses that emerged by 1947 believed that World War III, fought between the imperialist western powers and the USSR, would result in an international class war. The international decided that a proletarian revolution was the only way to prevent the USSR losing the conflict against imperialism, whilst also aligning with Trotsky's belief that communist parties were inherently counter-revolutionary.

=== Second World Congress ===
The Second World Congress in April 1948 was attended by delegates from 22 sections. It debated a range of resolutions on the Jewish Question, Stalinism, the colonial countries and the specific situations facing sections in certain countries. By this point the FI was united around the view that the Eastern European "buffer states" were still capitalist countries.

The Congress was especially notable for bringing the International into much closer contact with Trotskyist groups from across the globe. These included such significant groups as the Revolutionary Workers' Party of Bolivia and the Lanka Sama Samaja Party in what was then Ceylon, but the previously large Vietnamese Trotskyist groups had mostly been eliminated or absorbed by the supporters of Ho Chi Minh.

After the Second World Congress in 1948, the International Secretariat attempted to open communications with Josip Broz Tito's regime in Yugoslavia. In their analysis, it differed from the rest of the Eastern Bloc because it was established by the partisans of World War II who had fought against Nazi occupation, as opposed to by Stalin's invading armies. The British RCP, led by Jock Haston and supported by Ted Grant, were highly critical of this move.

=== Third World Congress ===
The Third World Congress in 1951 resolved that the economies of the eastern European states and their political regimes had come to resemble that of the USSR more and more. In a departure from Trotsky's ideas, Michel Pablo claimed that these states and their Stalinist parties could survive for centuries. These states were then described as deformed workers states in an analogy with the degenerated workers state in Russia. The term deformed was used rather than degenerated, because no workers' revolution had led to the foundation of these states.

The Third World Congress envisaged the real possibility of an "international civil war" in the near future. It argued that the mass Communist parties "may, under certain favourable conditions, go beyond the aims set for them by the Soviet bureaucracy and project a revolutionary orientation". Given the supposed closeness of war, the FI thought that the Communist Parties and social democratic parties would be the only significant force that could defend the workers of the world against the imperialist camp in those countries where there were mass forces.

In line with this geopolitical perspective, Pablo argued that the only way the Trotskyists could avoid isolation was for various sections of the Fourth International to undertake long-term entryism, referred to as "entrism sui generis", in the mass Communist or Social Democratic parties. This was in contrast to Trotsky's usage of entryism as a short-term tactic.

This perspective was accepted within the Fourth International, yet sowed the seeds for the split in 1953. At the Third World Congress, the sections agreed with the perspective of an international civil war. The French section disagreed with the associated tactic of entryism sui generis, and held that Pablo was underestimating the independent role of the working class parties in the Fourth International. The leaders of the majority of the Trotskyist organisation in France, Marcel Bleibtreu and Pierre Lambert, refused to follow the line of the International. The International leadership had them replaced by a minority, leading to a permanent split in the French section.

In the wake of the World Congress, the line of the International Leadership was generally accepted by groups around the world, including the U.S. SWP whose leader, James P. Cannon, corresponded with the French majority to support the tactic of entryism sui generis. At the same time, however, Cannon, Healy and Mandel were deeply concerned by Pablo's political evolution. Cannon and Healy were also alarmed by Pablo's intervention into the French section, and by suggestions that Pablo might use the International's authority in this way in other sections of the Fourth International that felt entryism "sui generis" was not a suitable tactic in their own countries. In particular, minority tendencies, exemplified in Britain by John Lawrence and in the U.S. by Bert Cochran, to support entryism "sui generis" hinted that Pablo's support for their views indicated that the International might also demand Trotskyists in those countries adopt that tactic.

== Platform ==
=== Trotskyism ===
Trotskyists regard themselves as working in opposition to both capitalism and Stalinism. Trotsky advocated proletarian revolution as set out in his theory of "permanent revolution", and believed that a workers' state would not be able to hold out against the pressures of a hostile capitalist world unless socialist revolutions quickly took hold in other countries as well. This theory was advanced in opposition to the view held by the Stalinists that "Socialism in One Country" could be built in the Soviet Union alone. Furthermore, Trotsky and his supporters harshly criticized the increasingly totalitarian nature of Joseph Stalin's rule. They argued that socialism without democracy is impossible. Thus, faced with the increasing lack of democracy in the Soviet Union, they concluded that it was no longer a socialist workers' state, but a degenerated workers' state.

In the Transitional Program, which was drafted during the founding congress of the Fourth International, Trotsky called for the legalization of the Soviet parties and worker's control of production.

Trotsky's organisation since 1923 as the Left Opposition opposed the bureaucratization of the Soviet Union, which they analysed as being partly caused by the poverty and isolation of the Soviet economy. Stalin's theory of socialism in one country was developed in 1924 as an opposition to Trotsky's theory of permanent revolution, which argued that capitalism was a world system and required a world revolution to replace it with socialism. Prior to 1924, the Bolsheviks' international perspective had been guided by Trotsky's position. Trotsky argued that Stalin's theory represented the interests of bureaucratic elements in direct opposition to the working class.

Eventually, Trotsky was sent into internal exile and his supporters were jailed. However, the Left Opposition continued to work in secret within the Soviet Union. Trotsky was exiled to Turkey in 1928. He moved from there to France, Norway and finally to Mexico. He was assassinated on Stalin's orders in Mexico in August 1940.

=== Political internationals ===
A political international is an organisation of political parties or activists with the aim of co-ordinating their activity for a common purpose. There had been a long tradition of socialists organising on an international basis, and Karl Marx had led the International Workingmen's Association, which later became known as the "first international".

After the International Workingmen's Association disbanded in 1876, several attempts were made to revive the organisation, culminating in the formation of the Socialist International (Second International) in 1889. This was disbanded in 1916 following disagreements over World War I. Although the organisation reformed in 1923 as the Labour and Socialist International, supporters of the October Revolution and the Bolsheviks had already set up the Communist International (Comintern), which they regarded as the Third International. This was organised on a democratic centralist basis, with component parties required to fight for policies adopted by the body as a whole.

By declaring themselves the Fourth International, the "World Party of Socialist Revolution", the Trotskyists were publicly asserting their continuity with the Comintern, and with its predecessors. Their recognition of the importance of these earlier Internationals was coupled with a belief that they eventually degenerated. Although the Socialist International and Comintern were still in existence, the Trotskyists did not believe those organisations were capable of supporting revolutionary socialism and internationalism.

The foundation of the Fourth International was therefore spurred in part by a desire to form a stronger political current, rather than being seen as the communist opposition to the Comintern and the Soviet Union. Trotsky believed that its formation was all the more urgent for the role he saw it playing in the impending World War.

== Legacy ==
=== Formation of the International Committee of the Fourth International ===
On 3-4 October 1953, representatives from The Club, the Internationalist Communist Party, the Swiss section of the FI and a member of the SWP (US) met to form a faction opposing Pabloism and liquidationism. At a meeting on 7-8 November 1953, the US SWP came into conflict with the FI's leadership for expelling a faction within their party, and was criticised in a letter written on 16 November for undermining the unity and principles of the FI.

In the same meeting, the SWP adopted A Letter to Trotskyists Throughout the World. which was then published in The Militant on 16 November 1953. The SWP's letter, which criticised Michel Pablo's leadership and urged sections to demand the removal of him and his allies, was backed by the "Resolution Forming the International Committee" published on 23 November 1953. The resolution had been signed by the sections who had met in October, along with a member from a New Zealand section who was allegedly Farrell Dobbs of the US SWP. The resolution officially organised the faction into the International Committee of the Fourth International (ICFI), claiming to represent the majority of Trotskyists in the Fourth International.

Sri Lanka's Lanka Sama Samaja Party, then the country's leading workers' party, took a middle position during this dispute. It continued to participate in the ISFI but argued for a joint congress, for reunification with the ICFI.

An excerpt from the Open Letter explains the split as follows:

To sum up: The lines of cleavage between Pablo's revisionism and orthodox Trotskyism are so deep that no compromise is possible either politically or organizationally. The Pablo faction has demonstrated that it will not permit democratic decisions truly reflecting majority opinion to be reached. They demand complete submission to their criminal policy. They are determined to drive all orthodox Trotskyists out of the Fourth International or to muzzle and handcuff them. Their scheme has been to inject their Stalinist conciliationism piecemeal and likewise in piecemeal fashion, get rid of those who come to see what is happening and raise objections.

=== From the Fourth World Congress to reunification ===
Over the following decade, the IC referred to the rest of the International as the "International Secretariat of the Fourth International", emphasising its view that the Secretariat did not speak for the International as a whole. The Secretariat continued to view itself as the leadership of the International. It held a Fourth World Congress in 1954 to regroup and to recognise reorganised sections in Britain, France and the U.S.

Parts of the International Committee were divided over whether the split with "Pabloism" was permanent or temporary, and it was perhaps as a result of this that it did not declare itself to be the Fourth International. Those sections that considered the split permanent embarked on a discussion about the history of the split and its meanings.

The sections of the International that recognised the leadership of the International Secretariat remained optimistic about the possibilities for increasing the International's political influence and extended the entryism into social democratic parties which was already underway in Britain, Austria and elsewhere. The 1954 Congress emphasised entryism into communist parties and nationalist parties in the colonies, pressing for democratic reforms, ostensibly to encourage the left-wing they perceived to exist in the communist parties to join with them in a revolution. Tensions developed between those who subscribed to the mainstream views of Pablo and a minority that argued unsuccessfully against open work. A number of these delegates walked out of the World Congress, and would eventually leave the International, including the leader of the new British section, John Lawrence, George Clarke, Michele Mestre (a leader of the French section), and Murray Dowson (a leader of the Canadian group).

The Secretariat organised a Fifth World Congress in October 1957. Mandel and Pierre Frank appraised the Algerian revolution and surmised that it was essential to reorient in the colonial states and neocolonies towards the emerging guerrilla-led revolutions. According to Robert Alexander, Ernest Mandel has written that an organisation in Indonesia, the Partai Acoma, was affiliate to the FI from 1959 until the 1965 coup in that country.

The Sixth World Congress in 1961 marked a lessening of the political divisions between the majority of supporters of the International Secretariat and the leadership of the SWP in the United States. In particular, the congress stressed support for the Cuban revolution and a growing emphasis on building parties in the imperialist countries. The sixth congress also criticised the Lanka Sama Samaja Party, its Sri Lankan section, for seeming to support the Sri Lanka Freedom Party, which they saw as bourgeois nationalists; the U.S. SWP made similar criticisms.

In 1962 the IC and IS formed a Parity Commission to organise a common World Congress. Despite the reunification efforts, the supporters of Michel Pablo and Juan Posadas opposed this. The supporters of Posadas left the International in 1962. At the 1963 reunification congress, the sections of the IC and IS reunified (with two exceptions: the British and French sections of the IC). This was largely a result of their mutual support for Ernest Mandel and Joseph Hansen's resolution Dynamics of World Revolution Today and for the Cuban Revolution. This document distinguished between different revolutionary tasks in the imperialist countries, the "workers' states", and the colonial and semi-colonial countries. In June 1963, the reunified Fourth International elected a United Secretariat of the Fourth International (USFI), by which name the organisation as a whole is often still referred.

=== Since reunification ===
Since the 1963 reunification, a number of approaches have developed within international Trotskyism towards the Fourth International.

- The reunified Fourth International is the only current with direct organisational continuity to the original Fourth International at an international level. The International Committee and International Secretariat reunified at the 1963 congress, but without the Socialist Labour League and Internationalist Communist Organisation. It is sometimes known as the United Secretariat of the Fourth International (USFI) after the name of its leading committee, although that committee was replaced in 2003. It is also the only current to have continuously presented itself as "the" Fourth International. It is the largest current and leaders of some other Trotskyist Internationals occasionally refer to it as "the Fourth International": ICFI secretary Gerry Healy, when proposing reunification discussions in the 1970s, described it as "the Fourth International"; the International Socialist Tendency also usually refers to it in this way.
- The International Committee of the Fourth International member groups customarily describe themselves as sections of the Fourth International, and the organisation as a whole describes itself as the "leadership of the Fourth International". However, the ICFI presents itself as the political continuity of the Fourth International and Trotskyism, not as the FI itself. It clearly dates its creation as 1953, rather than from 1938.
- Some tendencies argue that the Fourth International became dislocated politically during the years between Trotsky's murder and the establishment of the ICFI in 1953; they consequently work to "reconstruct", "reorganise" or "rebuild" it. This view originated with Lutte Ouvriere and the international Spartacist tendency and is shared by others who diverged from the ICFI. For example, the Committee for a Workers' International, whose founders dropped out of the reunified FI after 1965, call for a new "revolutionary Fourth International". Indeed, the Fourth International (ICR) reproclaimed the Fourth International at a congress attended by ICR sections in June 1993.
- Other Trotskyist groups argue that the Fourth International is dead. They call for the establishment of a new "workers' international" or a Fifth International.

== Impact ==
In uniting the large majority of Trotskyists in one organisation, the Fourth International created a tradition which has since been claimed by many Trotskyist organisations.

Echoing Marx's Communist Manifesto, the Transitional Programme ended with the declaration "Workers – men and women – of all countries, place yourselves under the banner of the Fourth International. It is the banner of your approaching victory!". It declared demands to be placed on capitalists, opposition to the bureaucracy in the Soviet Union, and support for workers' action against fascism. Most of the demands on capitalists remain unfulfilled. The collapse of the Soviet Union occurred, but through a social revolution leading to the restoration of capitalism, rather than the political revolution proposed by the Trotskyists. Many Trotskyist groups have been active in anti-fascist campaigns, but the Fourth International has never played a major role in the toppling of a regime.

Those groups which follow traditions that left the Fourth International in its early years argue that, despite initially correct positions, it had little impact. Lutte Ouvriere claims that it "did not survive the Second World War".

Other groups point to a positive impact. The ICFI claim that "the [early] Fourth International consisted mainly of cadres who remained true to their aims" and describes much of the Fourth International's early activity as "correct and principled". The reunified FI claim that "the Fourth International refused to compromise with capitalism either in its fascist or democratic variants." In its view, "many of the predictions made by Trotsky when he founded the Fourth International were proved wrong by history. But what was absolutely vindicated were his key political judgements."

== See also ==
- Entryism
- List of left-wing internationals
- List of Trotskyist internationals
- List of Trotskyist organizations by country

Leftist Internationals include:

United left wing

- International Workingmen's Association, the First International (1864–1876)

Anarchist

- International Anarchist Congresses: at first with the 1st International; followed by:
  - International Working People's Association, sometimes known as the "Black" International (1881–1887); anarchist
  - International Workers' Association – Asociación Internacional de los Trabajadores IWA–AIT (est. 1922) and the International of Anarchist Federations (IFA; est. 1968), with several spin-offs: Libertarian Communist International (est. 1954), Anarchist International Conference (est. 1958), International Libertarian Solidarity (SIL/ILS) network (est. 2001)

Socialist and labour

- Second International (1889–1916), socialist and labour
- Berne International (est. 1919), socialist
- International Working Union of Socialist Parties (IWUSP), a.k.a. 2½ International or Vienna International, founded by Austro-Marxists (1921–1923)
- Labour and Socialist International (1923–1940), created by merger of Vienna and Berne Internationals

Communist

- Communist International, a.k.a. Third International or Comintern (1919–1943)

Trotskyist

- Fourth International (1938-1953 schism) led by the International Secretariat (ISFI); followed by Trotskyist internationals
- Fourth International (post-reunification) (since 1963), by reunification of ISFI and parts of the International Committee of the Fourth International (ICFI)

Democratic socialism

- Socialist International (est. 1951)

Reunification efforts

- Fifth International, a phrase referring to socialist and communist groups aspiring to create a new workers' international
