= Pierre Frank =

French Trotskyist leader (1905–1984)

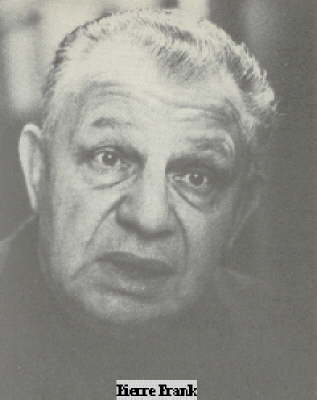
- Born: 24 October 1905; Paris, France
- Died: 18 April 1984 (aged 78); Paris, France
- Resting place: Père Lachaise Cemetery
- Occupation: Politician
- Political party: Internationalist Communist Party
- Movement: Trotskyism

Pierre Frank (French pronunciation: [pjɛʁ fʁɑ̃k]; 24 October 1905 – 18 April 1984) was a French Trotskyist leader. He served on the secretariat of the Fourth International from 1948 to 1979.

== Biography ==
Educated as a chemical engineer, Frank was one of the first French Trotskyists, working with surrealist Pierre Naville and the syndicalist Alfred Rosmer. In 1930, he joined Trotsky on the island of Prinkipo to work as a member of the secretariat that prepared the first conference of the International Left Opposition. Returning to France, he was a leader of the Communist League, the French Trotskyist organisation, in the 1930s.

After the rise of the 1934 Popular Front government in France, Frank was a part of the faction within the movement led by his friend Raymond Molinier that remained inside the SFIO after the majority followed Trotsky's advice to leave. Frank and his co-thinkers were expelled from the Movement for the Fourth International as a result. Frank was a founder-member of the "La Commune" group formed by Molinier. Ernest Mandel comments that the group "was chiefly identified with a thorough-going preparation of anti-militarist and anti-imperialist work that earned them repression and persecution at the hands of the French imperialist government."

When the Second World War broke out, Frank was sent to Great Britain in order to continue legally publishing the movement's documents. He issued a publication called International Correspondence but, as an illegal resident, was briefly interned in a British internment camp. Apart from the help of Betty Hamilton, the British Trotskyists were not in sympathy with his views.

At the end of the Second World War he returned to France where his current campaigned for the reunification of the French Trotskyists. He joined the leadership of the Internationalist Communist Party (PCI). At the 1948 World Congress he joined the international leadership team that included Ernest Mandel and Michel Pablo.

He was important in maintaining the PCI in the 1950s and into the 1960s. He was elected to the United Secretariat of the Fourth International in 1963 and served as an editor of Intercontinental Press. When the PCI was dissolved into the new Communist League in 1968, he was a part of the leadership and continued in it until his death.

He was the author of a history of Trotskyism entitled The Long March of the Trotskyists and Histoire de l'Internationale communiste (1919–1943), ed. La Breche, 1979.

His ashes are in the Cimetière du Père Lachaise.
