= History of the Socialist Workers Party (United States) =

The Socialist Workers Party (SWP) was created in 1938 after Communist Party USA expelled supporters of Leon Trotsky (against Joseph Stalin). For most of its history, SWP was the largest Trotskyist organization in the US. In the 1980s, the SWP turned from Trotskyism towards Castroism.

In the 1960s and 1970s, SWP and its youth wing, the Young Socialist Alliance, were together the 3rd-largest socialist organizations, below the Communist Party USA and Students for a Democratic Society. SWP suffered many splits and its membership declined. The modern SWP is smaller than its progeny, such as the Trotskyist Socialist Alternative and the Marxist-Leninist Party for Socialism and Liberation.

== Origins ==
=== Communist League of America ===
The SWP traces its origins back to the former Communist League of America (CLA), founded in 1928 by members of the CPUSA expelled for supporting Russian communist leader Leon Trotsky against Joseph Stalin. Concentrated almost exclusively in New York City and Minneapolis, the CLA did not have more than 100 adherents in 1929. After five years of propaganda work, the CLA remained a tiny organization, with a membership of about 200 and very little influence.

The rise of fascism in Nazi Germany and the failure to stop its rise created a situation where radical parties throughout the world reexamined their priorities and sought mechanisms for building united action. As early as December 1933, a Trotskyist splinter group called the Communist League of Struggle (CLS), headed by former Socialist Party youth section leader Albert Weisbord and his wife Vera Buch, approached Norman Thomas of the Socialist Party of America seeking a united front hunger march of the two organizations followed by a general strike. This suggestion was dismissed as "poppycock" by SP Executive Secretary Clarence Senior, but the seed of the idea of joint action had been planted.

== 1930s ==
=== Entryism and 1935 split ===
Early in 1934, some French Trotskyists of the Communist League conceived of the idea of entering the French Section of the Workers' International (SFIO) in order to recruit members for the Trotskyists, or so some critics have charged. The group retained its identity as a factional organization inside the SFIO and built a base among the party's youth section, continuing their activity until popular front action between the SFIO and the mainline Communist Party of France made their position untenable. This tactic of "entering" the larger social democratic parties of each country, endorsed by Trotsky himself, became known as the "French Turn" and was replicated by various Trotskyist parties around the world. In 1934, the Communist League of America merged with the American Workers Party led by A. J. Muste, forming the Workers Party of the United States.

Throughout 1935, the Workers Party was deeply divided over the "entryism" tactic called for by the "French Turn" and a bitter debate swept the organization. Ultimately, the majority faction of Jim Cannon, Max Shachtman and James Burnham won the day and the Workers Party determined to enter the Socialist Party of America. A minority faction headed by Hugo Oehler refused to accept this result and split from the organization into the Revolutionary Workers League.

The Socialist Party was itself beset with factional disagreements. The party's left-wing Militant faction sought to expand the organization into an "all-inclusive party"—inviting in members of the Lovestone and Trotskyist movements as well as radical individuals as the first step towards making the Socialist Party a mass party. Although there were no mass entries at this time, several radical oppositionists did make their way into the party, including former Communist Party leader Benjamin Gitlow, youth leader and ex-Jay Lovestone supporter Herbert Zam and attorney and American Workers Party activist Albert Goldman. Goldman at this time also joined with YPSL leader Ernest Erber to establish a newspaper in Chicago with a Trotskyist orientation, The Socialist Appeal, later to serve as the organ of the Trotskyists inside the Socialist Party.

In January 1936, just as the National Executive Committee of the Socialist Party was expelling the Old Guard for their factional organization and alleged "violation of party discipline", James Cannon and his faction won their internal battle in the Workers Party to join the Socialist Party, when a national branch referendum voted unanimously for entry. Negotiations commenced with the Socialist Party leadership, with the admissions ultimately made on the basis of individual applications for membership rather than admission of the Workers Party and its approximately 2,000 members as a group. On June 6, 1936, the Workers Party's weekly newspaper, The New Militant, published its last issue and announced "Workers Party Calls All Revolutionary Workers to Join Socialist Party".

They fear, in a word, that Soviet America will become the counterpart of what they have been told Soviet Russia looks like. Actually American soviets will be as different from the Russian soviets as the United States of President Roosevelt differs from the Russian Empire of Czar Nicholas II. Yet communism can come in America only through revolution, just as independence and democracy came in America.

— Trotsky on If America Should Go Communist in 1934.

At its inception, the entryist tactic was likely made in good faith. Historian Constance Myers writes that "initial prognoses for the union of Trotskyists and Socialists were favorable", but "constant and protracted contact caused differences to surface" later. Party leader Jim Cannon later hinted that the entry of the Trotskyists into the Socialist Party had been a contrived tactic aimed at stealing "confused young Left Socialists" for his own organization. The Trotskyists retained a common orientation with the radicalized Socialist Party in their opposition to the European war, their preference for industrial unionism and the Congress of Industrial Organizations over the trade unionism of the American Federation of Labor, a commitment to trade union activism, and the defense of the Soviet Union as the first workers' state, while at the same time maintaining antipathy toward Stalin's government.

Cannon went to Tujunga, California, a suburb of Los Angeles, to establish another new newspaper, Labor Action, targeted to trade unionists and Socialist Party members and aimed at winning them over to Trotskyist views while Shachtman and Burnham handled the bulk of the faction's activities in New York. Norman Thomas attracted nearly 188,000 votes in his 1936 Socialist Party run for President, but performed poorly in historic strongholds of the party. Moreover, the party's membership had begun to decline. The organization was deeply factionalized, with the Militant faction split into right ("Altmanite"), center ("Clarity") and left ("Appeal") factions, in addition to the radical pacifists led by Thomas. A special convention was planned for the last week of March 1937 to set the party's future policy, initially intended as an unprecedented "secret" gathering.

=== Split from the Socialist Party of America ===
Prior to the March convention, the Trotskyist Socialist Appeal faction held an organizational gathering of their own in Chicago, with 93 delegates gathering on February 20–22, 1937. The meeting organized the faction on a permanent basis, electing a National Action Committee of five to "coordinate branch work" and "formulate Appeal policies".The committee included Vincent Dunne, Albert Goldman, Max Shachtman, and Richard Babb Whitten. Two delegates from the Clarity caucus were in attendance. James Burnham vigorously attacked the Labour and Socialist International, the international organization of left-wing parties to which the Socialist Party belonged and tension rose along these lines among the Trotskyists. United action between the Clarity and Appeal groups was not forthcoming and an emergency meeting of Vincent Dunne and Cannon was held in New York with leaders of the various factions including Thomas, Jack Altman, and Gus Tyler of Clarity. At this meeting, Thomas pledged that the upcoming convention would make no effort to terminate the newspapers of the various factions.

There was no action to expel the Trotskyist Appeal faction, but pressure continued to build along these lines, egged on by the Communist Party's increasingly vehement denunciations of Trotsky and his followers as wreckers and agents of international fascism. The convention passed a ban on future branch resolutions on controversial matters, an effort to rein in the activities of the factions at the local level. It also banned factional newspapers, establishing a national organ instead.

Constance Myers indicates that three factors led to the Trotskyists' expulsion from the Socialist Party in 1937: the divergence between the official Socialists and the Trotskyist faction on the issues, the determination of Altman's wing of the Militants to oust the Trotskyists, and Trotsky's own decision to move toward a break with the party. Recognizing that the Clarity faction had chosen to stand with the Altmanites and the Thomas group, Trotsky recommended that the Appeal group focus on disagreements over Spain to provoke a split. At the same time, Thomas, freshly returned from Spain, had concluded that the Trotskyists had joined the Socialist Party not to make it stronger, but to capture it for their own purposes.

On June 24–25, 1937, a meeting of the Appeal faction's National Action Committee voted to ratchet up the rhetoric against the American Labor Party and Republican nominee for Mayor of New York City, Fiorello H. La Guardia (a favorite son of many in Socialist ranks), and to reestablish their newspaper, The Socialist Appeal. This was met with expulsions from the party beginning August 9 with a rump meeting of the Central Committee of Local New York, which expelled 52 New York Trotskyists by a vote of 48 to 2 (with 18 abstentions) and ordering 70 more to be brought up on charges. Wholesale expulsions followed, with a major section of the Young People's Socialist League (YPSL) leaving the party with the Trotskyists.

The 1,000 or so Trotskyists who entered the Socialist Party in 1936 exited in the summer of 1937 with their ranks swelled by another 1,000. On December 31, 1937, representatives of this faction gathered in Chicago to establish a new political organization—the Socialist Workers Party.

=== Formation of the Socialist Workers Party ===
Logo of The Militant, the SWP's newspaper

The October 2, 1937, issue of the Socialist Appeal included a convention call from the so-called "Left Wing" to "All Locals and Branches of the Socialist Party", accusing the NEC of the party of having "betrayed the principles of socialism" by withdrawing the party's candidate for mayor of New York in favor of LaGuardia and for having ordered "the bureaucratic expulsion of all the revolutionary members of the party who oppose and obstruct this sell-out policy". A convention was called by four Socialist Party State Committees, the NEC of the YPSL and the organized Left Wing organizations of Chicago and New York, originally slated for Thanksgiving weekend, November 25–28, in Chicago, but it was soon postponed until December 31 "in order to provide adequate time for discussion by the membership" of important questions.

In December 1937, an agenda was published by the Convention Organizing Committee naming Cannon as the primary reporter on the Trade Union question, Shachtman on the Russian Resolution, Goldman on the Spanish Resolution, Canadian Maurice Spector on the International Resolution, Burnham on the Declaration of Principles of the new organization and Abern on Party Organization and Constitution. The gathering was to conclude with the election of a new National Committee.

On December 31, over 100 regular and fraternal delegates gathered in Chicago, where they were greeted by a speech of welcome delivered by Chicago leader Albert Goldman, a labor attorney. As editor of the Trotskyist movement's ongoing theoretical magazine, The New International, Shachtman delivered the first official report to the gathering, dealing with the political situation in the United States. He declared:

It is entirely inconceivable that American imperialism can succeed in resisting the inexorable tendencies that are pulling it into the vortex of the coming world war.

If the working class is unable to prevent the outbreak of war, and the United States enters directly into it, our party stands pledged to the traditional position of revolutionary Marxism.

It will utilize the crisis of capitalist rule engendered by the war to prosecute the class struggle with the utmost intransigence, to strengthen the independent labor and revolutionary movements, and to bring the war to a close by the revolutionary overthrow of capitalism and the establishment of proletarian rule in the form of the workers state.

The convention devoted a full day to discussion of the labor movement's problems and the role of the new organization in the unions, with Cannon delivering the primary report. While criticizing the "reactionary role which the AFL leadership has played", Cannon declared that "our party...takes a clear-cut position in favor of the earliest and completest possible unification of the AFL and the CIO, and also the hitherto unaffiliated Railroad Brotherhoods".

== 1940s ==
=== 1940 split ===
The 1940 split in the SWP followed an internal factional debate over the party's internal government, the class nature of the Russian state and Marxist philosophy and other questions. The SWP experienced many other factional conflicts and splits in its history, but this was the largest and foreshadowed many features of those to come.

The majority faction, led by Cannon, supported Trotsky's position that the Soviet Union remained a "workers' state" and should be supported in any war with capitalist states, despite their opposition to Stalin's government. The minority faction, led by Shachtman, held that the Soviet Union should not be supported in its war with Finland. One of its leaders, James Burnham, held in addition that the Soviet Union had degenerated so far that it deserved no defense whatsoever. Like this debate, most later factional disputes within the SWP centered on different attitudes toward revolutions in other countries.

The opposition faction alleged that Cannon's leadership of the SWP was "bureaucratic conservative" and demanded the right to its own publications to express its views outside the party. The majority faction said this was contrary to Lenin's concept of democratic centralism and that disagreements within the SWP should be debated only internally. Similar disagreements over the SWP's internal government have surfaced in most later faction fights, with most later opposition factions raising similar demands and accusations. Despite this, most of these later factions claimed political descent from Cannon and the SWP majority, not from earlier opposition factions and splinter parties.

The minority faction led by Shachtman eventually split away almost 40% of the party's membership and 80% of its youth organization, the Young People's Socialist League, forming the Workers Party.

=== World War II ===
A number of members were imprisoned under the Smith Act of 1941, under Franklin D. Roosevelt's administration, including Cannon (see Smith Act Trials). Those imprisoned included the main national leaders of the SWP and those members most prominent in the Midwest Teamsters. With Roosevelt's decision to increase the power of the FBI during this time, the arrests were made swiftly.

The party put into practice the so-called Proletarian Military Policy of opposing the war politically while attempting to transform what they saw as an imperialist war into a civil war. The party lost a number of its members while sailing in extremely perilous convoys to Murmansk. Problems caused by some experienced leaders' imprisonment and many others' enlistment in the armed forces meant that the editorship of The Militant passed through a number of hands during the war.

The SWP was active in supporting labor strikes that occurred despite the wartime "no-strike pledge" and protests against racist discrimination during the war, such as A. Philip Randolph's March on Washington Movement. The SWP maintained that the Fair Employment Practice Committee was insufficient to address racist discrimination. The Post Office refused to mail some issues of The Militant and threatened to cancel its third-class mailing permit, citing objections to its articles calling for violent overthrow of the government. The SWP said it was being persecuted for opposing racist discrimination.

=== Postwar years ===
After the war, the SWP and the Fourth International both expected that there would be a wave of revolutionary struggles like those that accompanied the end of the previous war. Indeed, revolutions did occur in Yugoslavia, Albania, Korea and China, to name only those that resulted in the overthrow of capitalism, but contrary to Trotskyist expectations they were headed by Moscow-oriented "Stalinist" parties.

The largest strike wave in United States history, involving over five million workers, occurred with the end of the war and the wartime pledge made by many union leaders not to strike for the duration, but this did not mean there were not many strikes during wartime as there were many wildcat strikes during this period as well as strikes officially called by the United Mine Workers of America. There were also protests by GIs demanding rapid demobilization after the end of the war, sometimes called the going-home movement. The SWP participation in this upsurge led to a brief period of rapid growth for the SWP immediately after the war.

The end of the war also saw the reorganization of the Fourth International in which the SWP played a major role. As part of this process, moves were made to heal the breach with Shachtman's supporters in the Workers Party (WP) and for the two groups to fuse. This eventually came to nothing, but some SWP members who supported the views of Felix Morrow and Albert Goldman grew dissatisfied with what they saw as the SWP's ultra-leftist attitude towards revolutionary policies. Eventually, they left the SWP in a state of demoralization and some joined the WP.

Meanwhile, a faction within the WP called the Johnson–Forest Tendency, named for C. L. R. James (known as Johnson) and Raya Dunayevskaya (Forest), was impatient with the WP's caution and felt the situation could rapidly become pre-revolutionary. This led them to leave the WP and rejoin the SWP in 1947. This tendency had moved further away from the "orthodox Trotskyism" of the SWP, producing tension. For example, they continued to hold the position that the Soviet Union was a "state capitalist" society. By 1951, their presence in the SWP was ever more anomalous and most left to form the Correspondence Publishing Committee. Dunayevskaya and her supporters eventually formed the News and Letters Committees in 1955 after splitting with James, who was deported from the United States to Britain, where he continued to advise the Correspondence Publishing Committee, which split again in 1962, with those loyal to James taking the name Facing Reality.

== 1950s ==
The brief postwar wave of labor unrest gave way to the conservatism of the 1950s, the reform of previously radical labor unions and McCarthyism. The SWP's attempt at entryism into the growing civil rights movement, which continued uninterrupted out of World War II, could not fully offset these trends and the SWP experienced a period of decline and isolation.

Meanwhile, throughout the 1950s and into the 1960s the remaining members of the SWP clung to its firmly held beliefs and grew older. Consequently, the party membership shrank over these years from a postwar high in 1948 until the tide began to turn in the early 1960s. The Cuban Revolution signaled a change in the SWP's political direction as it embarked on pro-Castro "solidarity work" through the Fair Play for Cuba Committee. The result was a small accretion of youth to the party's ranks. In the same period, longtime SWP leader Murry Weiss won another group of youth from the Shachtmanites as they joined the Socialist Party of America. Many of the new recruits were drawn from the student movement, unlike those who had led the party since the 1930s; as a result, the party's internal culture began to change.

=== 1953 split ===
The party also had a number of splits over these years. One saw the departure of the faction of Bert Cochran and Clarke, who formed the American Socialist Union, which lasted until 1959. That 1953 opposition supported some of the positions of Michel Pablo, the Secretary of the Fourth International, although Pablo disagreed with their wish to dissolve the Fourth International.

=== 1958 split ===
The next, smaller split was that of Sam Marcy's Global Class War faction, which called within the SWP for support of Henry Wallace's Progressive Party presidential run in 1948 and regarded Mao Zedong as a revolutionary leader. This faction ended up leaving the SWP in 1958 after supporting the suppression of the Hungarian Revolution of 1956, a position contrary to that of the SWP and other Trotskyist tendencies. It went on to form the Workers World Party.

== 1960s ==
Despite such growing signs of an end to the isolation the group endured during the McCarthyite period, it experienced a new split in the early 1960s. A number of small oppositional groups developed within the party.

The SWP successfully negotiated a reunification of the ISFI and the International Committee of the Fourth International, leading to the creation in 1963 of the reunified Fourth International. Two sections of the ICFI, including Gerry Healy's Socialist Labour League, rejected the merger and turned against the SWP leadership, working with opponents within the party.

Like many other left-wing groups, the SWP grew during the 1960s and experienced particularly brisk growth in early 1970s. Much of this was due to its involvement in many of the campaigns and demonstrations against the war in Vietnam. The SWP advocated that the antiwar movement call for the immediate withdrawal of all American troops and focus on organizing large, legal demonstrations for this demand. It was recognized by friend and foe alike as a major factor influencing the direction of the antiwar movement along these lines. One of the leaders of the antiwar movement at this time, along with Dave Dellinger and many others, was Fred Halstead, a World War II veteran and former leader of the garment workers union in New York City. Halstead was the SWP's 1968 presidential nominee and visited Vietnam in that capacity.

The party also published many of Trotsky's works in these years through its publishing house, Pathfinder Press. Not only were the better-known writings reprinted, many for the first time since the 1930s, but other more obscure articles and letters were collected and printed for a wider audience than they had when first distributed. The expansion of the press also allowed the SWP to host Intercontinental Press, the FI magazine that moved from Paris to New York in 1969, which later merged with Inprecor.

=== 1964 splits ===
The most important faction opposing the SWP leadership's new line was the Revolutionary Tendency (RT), led by James Robertson and Tim Wohlforth, which rejected the SWP's "capitulation" to Pabloism and opposed joining the USFI. It was critical of the Castro government, arguing that Cuba remained a "deformed workers' state". But a split developed within this faction between groups headed by Robertson and Wohlforth, who formed the Reorganized Minority Tendency (RMT). Both the RT and the RMT split, but formed separate organizations. The RT formed the Spartacist (see Spartacist League) and the RMT formed the Socialist Equality Party, respectively, with the latter becoming aligned with Healy's SLL.

=== 1966 split ===
In the aftermath, the Seattle branch also left to found the Freedom Socialist Party after protesting the alleged suppression of internal democracy, as did Murray and Myra Tanner Weiss. These groups later attempted to create the Committee for a Revolutionary Socialist Party.

=== Turn toward Cuba ===
One of the key issues was the Cuban Revolution and the SWP's response to it. Cannon and other SWP leaders such as Joseph Hansen saw Cuba as qualitatively different from the Stalinist states of Eastern Europe. Their analysis brought them closer to the International Secretariat of the Fourth International (ISFI), from which the SWP had split in 1953.

Through the 1960s, the SWP was increasingly outspoken in its defense of Castro's government and its identification with that government. A new leadership led by Jack Barnes (who became national secretary in 1972) made identification with Cuba an ever-greater part of the SWP's politics throughout the 1970s.

=== Black nationalism ===
The SWP supported both the civil rights movement and the black nationalist movement that grew during the 1960s. It particularly praised the militancy of black nationalist leader Malcolm X, who in turn spoke at the SWP's public forums and gave an interview to Young Socialist magazine. After his assassination, the SWP had limited success in forming alliances with his followers and other black nationalists. But these movements were part of the radicalization that aided the SWP's growth.

The SWP provided a political ideology for African Americans seeking equality in the early 20th century. Black nationalists were in favor of socialist policy and ideas. During the 1960s, the SWP had begun nominating African American candidates for president. The SWP hoped to change American values and ensure each citizen had equal rights under the law. "Many black nationalists turned to the Socialist Workers Party because the SWP proposed that its black members collaborate with other militant African Americans", according to a group of historians studying the public service of African Americans. The SWP expanded the ideas of nationalism to African Americans and arguably expanded black nationalism for generations.

=== 1960-1976: COINTELPRO and FBI infiltration ===
According to the Church Committee report of 1976, the U.S. Federal Bureau of Investigation (FBI) had investigated the SWP since 1940 and, in 1961, initiated a COINTELPRO program against it. The FBI said it had targeted the SWP because of its support for "such causes as Castro's Cuba and integration problems arising in the South". Under the COINTELPRO operation the FBI collected information about SWP members' political views, conducted up to 92 breakins of SWP offices, and interfered in elections to damage SWP candidates' campaigns. FBI officials testified to the Church Committee that the SWP has "not been responsible for any violent acts nor has it urged actions constituting an indictable incitement to violence".

Between 1960 and 1976, the FBI used 1,300 informants against the SWP and YSA, including 300 SWP/YSA members. The FBI's highest-placed member was Ed Heisler, who was a member of the SWP National Committee from 1977 to 1979. In 1986, the party won a lawsuit against the FBI as a result of years of spying and disruption. It was also found that Herbert Hill of the NAACP, a former SWP member, was an informant on the party after he left in the 1940s.

== 1970s ==
=== New leadership ===
The growth of labor militancy in the early 1970s affected the SWP and currents developed within it urging a reorientation of the party toward this militancy. One such current was the Proletarian Orientation Tendency, which included Larry Trainor, and eventually dissolved.

The international tensions developed further when the SWP and its co-thinkers established the Leninist Trotskyist Tendency in 1973 in order to contribute to the debate for the Tenth World Congress. It argued for a reversal of the Latin American guerrilla war orientation adopted at the Ninth World Congress. This period was the peak of the SWP's growth and influence. The party continued its involvement in the movement against the war in Vietnam, which peaked in 1970–1971. The SWP also supported Chicano nationalism, including the Raza Unida Party. It helped organize protests demanding legal abortion through the Women's National Abortion Action Coalition. With the mid-to-late 1970s decline of these movements and the end of the 1960s–1970s youth radicalization, SWP membership and influence went into decline.

In 1975, SWP had about 1,500 active members.

=== 1974 split ===
In 1974, the Internationalist Tendency (IT) developed. The IT posed a greater challenge to the SWP leadership's relationship with the Fourth International, as the IT agreed with the Fourth International's advocacy of guerrilla warfare as a "tactic on a continental scale" in Latin America. But despite tensions between the SWP and the International, when the SWP expelled the IT, the International refused to side with the IT. In 1974, the SWP expelled 115 members of the IT, the largest split since 1953. The IT disintegrated over the next few months, some of its supporters finding their way back into the SWP.

=== Turn to industry ===
In 1978, the SWP leadership decided that the key task was for party members to make a turn to industry. This turn entailed party members getting jobs in blue-collar industries in preparation for, the SWP leadership projected, increasing mass struggles. The 1977–1978 coal miners' strike and developments like Steelworkers Fight Back were among the events pointed to in arguing for this change in policy. Party members sought to get jobs in the same workplaces in order to work as organized "fractions", doing "communist political work" as well as union activity.

As a result, many members were asked to move and change jobs, often out of established careers and into low-paying jobs in small towns. Many of the older members with experience in trade unions resisted this "colonization program", which upset their established routine in the unions, as did some of the younger members.

== 1980s ==
=== Opposition to new leadership ===
Opposition to the "turn to industry" developed within the SWP. This opposition was not homogeneous and was itself beset by differences among different factions.

A further factor in the growing divisions within the SWP was the move by Jack Barnes, Mary-Alice Waters and others in the leadership away from the Trotskyist label. In 1982, Barnes gave a speech, later published as Their Trotsky and Ours: Communist Continuity Today, in which he rejected Trotsky's theory of permanent revolution, arguing that it failed to sufficiently distinguish between the democratic and socialist tasks of a workers' revolution. Barnes argued that anticapitalist revolutions typically began with a "workers' and farmers' government" that initially concentrated on bourgeois-democratic measures and only later moved on to the abolition of capitalism.

Barnes also argued that the Trotskyist label unnecessarily distinguished leftists in that tradition from leftists of other origins, such as the Cuban Communist Party or the Sandinista National Liberation Front. He argued that the SWP had more in common with these organizations than with many groups calling themselves Trotskyist. The SWP has continued to publish numerous books by Trotsky and advocate a number of ideas commonly associated with Trotskyism, including Trotsky's analysis of Stalinism.

=== 1983 splits ===
The opposition factions continued to support the theory of permanent revolution and the Trotskyist label: they anticipated that the SWP leadership was reassessing its place in the Fourth International. While declaring their support for the Cuban and the leftist Nicaraguan governments, they were more critical of the Castroist and Sandinista leadership. They also continued to oppose the "turn to industry".

One opposition group rallied around the Weinsteins on the West Coast (with supporters elsewhere too), while another rallied around George Breitman and Frank Lovell. Together they formed an opposition bloc on the SWP's National Committee, but in 1983 both groups were expelled. The opposition factions, having split from the SWP, formed new organizations. The Weinstein group formed the San Francisco-based Socialist Action. The Breitman-Lovell group after a time formed the Fourth Internationalist Tendency. Both groups called themselves "public factions" of the SWP and set the task of recapturing the SWP to their understanding of Trotskyism. Another group, mainly in Los Angeles, had been close to Breitman, belonged briefly to Socialist Action, and left to join the "regroupment" organization Solidarity.

=== Mark Curtis case ===
The SWP's most high-profile and controversial campaign in the late 1980s and early 1990s was its Mark Curtis Defense Committee, established after Curtis, an SWP activist and trade union organizer, was convicted of burglary and rape in 1988. The party said that police had framed Curtis for his role in defending immigrant workers. Curtis was eventually paroled, but he was later arrested in Chicago on prostitution-related charges and then expelled from the SWP.

== 1990s to present: Internal peace and decline ==
Since the 1990s, the SWP has experienced an unusually long period of internal peace. It has also declined steadily in both membership and political influence on the American left.

In 2003, the party sold its major headquarters building in New York City for $20 million and moved to another location in Manhattan. Party leaders Barnes and Mary-Alice Waters subsequently sold their West Village condominium for $1.87 million.

In 2021, a former member wrote that the SWP had about 100 members and 200 supporters, with members mostly "retired or nearly so".

== See also ==
- Working Families Party articles:
  - List of Working Families Party public officeholders
- American Left
