= Revolutionary Tendency (SWP) =

The Revolutionary Tendency within the American Socialist Workers Party was an internal faction that disagreed with the direction the leadership was taking the party on several important issues. Many groups and movements would have their roots in the RT, both in the United States and internationally, including the Socialist Equality Party and the world Spartacist and LaRouche movements and their various splinters.

The Revolutionary Tendency first crystallized around opposition to the SWP's line regarding the Cuban Revolution. The leadership regarded the Cuban regime as a full blown workers' state deserving unqualified defense by the Party. The RT rejected this because of the revolution's "petty bourgeois" leadership, and the absence of a vanguard party prior to the overthrow of the authoritarian government of Fulgencio Batista on 1 January 1959. The RT also objected to the moves of the SWP toward leaving the International Committee of the Fourth International and joining the "Pabloite" International Secretariat of the Fourth International. They also saw a danger of Pabloism within the SWP as well, because of what they regarded as a downplaying of the counter-revolutionary role of Stalinism. All of these positions were spelled out in a document called "In Defense of a Revolutionary Perspective - A Statement of Basic Positions", drawn up by Tim Wohlforth and others and presented to the SWP national committee in March 1962.

The tendency was concentrated among members who had been in the left wing of the Young Socialist League who had rejected merger into the Young People's Socialist League when Max Shachtman, leader of the parent Independent Socialist League had merged with the YPSL's parent group, the Socialist Party-Social Democratic Federation. This group had subsequently been recruited by the SWP and were instrumental in founding the SWPs new youth group, the Young Socialist Alliance in 1960.

The initial membership of the tendency was quite small, about 35 in October 1961, with clusters in New York and Bay Area of about 15 each. Subsequently the tendency grew with cadres in Detroit, Philadelphia and New Haven, Connecticut. The RT initially controlled the National Committee of the YSA, but the SWP leadership was able to out them.

On November 1, 1963 the Political Committee adopted a resolution suspending James Robertson, Shane Mage, Larry Ireland, and Lynne Harper. Two months later the Committee voted 18-1 to expel these members entirely. Early the next year the first issue of Spartacist appeared dated "February–March 1964" and published by "the supporters of the Revolutionary Tendency expelled from the Socialist Workers Party". The paper announced that the group would continue publishing "pending our re-admission to the SWP and resumption of our proper role within it." The expelled members appealed their expulsion to the Fourth International (FI). They sent a letter dated February 23, 1964 to Pierre Frank requesting the FI to express their opinion regarding their organizational rights. On April 17 Frank replied, enclosing a resolution of the FI condemning the Spartacists. The expelled group tried one last time to appeal its expulsion. In May 1965 Harry Turner requested that the USFI allow it to present its case to its World Congress scheduled for that June. They were again rebuffed, claiming that since the SWP was not an official section of the FI they had no jurisdiction in the matter.

== Reorganized Minority Tendency ==
In 1962 the RT itself splintered. A section that called itself the Reorganized Minority Tendency, which included Wohlforth, Albert Philips, Fred Mazelis and Lyndon LaRouche, split off. This group was more vocal in its adherence to the International Committee, and to the line led by Gerry Healy and the British Socialist Labour League. They also rejected the RTs characterization of the SWP as centrist, which they regarded as "giving up the political battle before it has begun". They were adamant against splitting the SWP, and obeying internal party discipline. At the 1963 SWP convention the Party decided to join the United Secretariat of the Fourth International and remove Wohlforth, who was already taking instructions from Healy, from his position on the Political Committee. The RMT members were expelled in early 1964 after disagreeing with the position the Party took with regard to the actions of the Trotskyist party in Ceylon. The expelled members reorganized themselves as the American Committee for the Fourth International, later the Socialist Equality Party.

== See also ==
- History of the Socialist Workers Party (United States)
