= Committee for a Revolutionary Socialist Party =

The Committee for a Revolutionary Socialist Party was an attempt to set up a "united front" of several dissident American Trotskyist groups in the 1980s.

The participating groups came from different backgrounds, but all ultimately traced their lineage to the Socialist Workers Party.

- The Freedom Socialist Party had been organized by the Seattle branch of the SWP in the mid-1960s. It espouses a unique form of socialist feminism and was led by Clara Fraser.
- The Socialist Union. This group was led by Milton Zaslow, who had been one of the original leaders of the Cochranites in the 1950s, before dropping out of political activity for a number of years. In 1969 he created a new organization in Los Angeles called Liberation Union. After merging with a group that had been expelled from the SWP in the early 1970s, the Internationalist Tendency, he renamed the group Socialist Union.
- A tendency around Murry Weiss and Myra Tanner Weiss based in New York. Not an organized faction, but a tendency around these two SWP leaders who had dropped out of the organization because of its intolerance to any criticism of the leaderships policies.
- Trotskyist Organizing Committee or Turnerites. This group had been expelled from the Spartacist League in 1968. They had originally organized around their periodical Vanguard Newsletter, had briefly become part of the Class Struggle League in 1973, then formed their own group in 1975.

A First National Conference attended by 100 members and fraternal representatives of these groups met in Union, Washington, October 6–9, 1978. It adopted resolutions emphasizing the importance of women, minorities, gays and undocumented workers as the most oppressed section of the working class, and were anticipated to be the "vanguard of the proletariat". It also noted that "privileged layers within the working class" increased the gulf between workers and bred "reactionary habits".

The conference also issued a document that tried to appeal to those leaders within the United Secretariat of the Fourth International who were hostile to Socialist Workers Party, criticizing the latter for bureaucratism, Stalinophobia and sexophobia and accused the USFI of attempting to form an "unprincipled bloc" with the SWP. At the time of the Morenoist split with the United Secretariat and its parity commission with the Lambertist faction of the Fourth International, the CRSP sought affiliation with it, but does not appear to have been successful.

The group imploded when its steering committee held a plenum in Seattle, July 4–7, 1980. There a decision was made to drop the united front type of organization in favor of a disciplined democratic centralist party. After this, the Turnerites and the Socialist Union left the CRSP. Murry Weiss joined the FSP.
