= Pat Schulz =

Canadian feminist

Pat Schulz (August 17, 1934 – December 12, 1983) was an influential Canadian feminist, revolutionary socialist, organizer and writer. She was the subject of the National Film Board of Canada documentary Worth Every Minute, directed by Catherine Macleod and Lorraine Segato. Toronto's Pat Schulz Child Care Centre is named in her honour.

== Activism in the League for Socialist Action (Canada) ==
For two decades, Schulz was a key leader of the revolutionary socialist movement in Canada. Schulz joined the Co-operative Commonwealth Federation in 1952, at age 18. She was attracted to the left wing of the party. Ian Angus recalls: 'Not long after joining, a CCF member tried to warn her against collaborating with a certain party member because that person was a member of the Revolutionary Workers Party. She said the warning didn't have the intended effect... "I thought, Wow! Not just a workers’ party, but a revolutionary workers’ party. I had to meet those people."

The Revolutionary Workers Party, founded in 1946, was the Canadian section of the Fourth International, the worldwide Trotskyist movement. In 1954, the Ontario CCF expelled all Trotskyist members, including Schulz. From 1954 to 1974, she was a member and leader first of the Socialist Education League and later the League for Socialist Action-Ligue Socialiste Ouvriere (LSA-LSO). The LSA-LSO was one of the predecessor organizations of the Revolutionary Workers League (RWL). One of Schulz’s first projects was the 1955 launching of the Canadian edition of Workers Vanguard, a newspaper to which she was a regular contributor.

In 1964 Schulz ran for the position of Toronto city council controller as the LSA-LSO candidate. That same year, Schulz was part of an all-women team that traveled throughout Ontario in a half-ton truck selling s subscriptions to Workers Vanguard. They were called "The Trailblazers" and they went to plant and factory gates and door-to-door, selling the newspaper.

== Desegregating the Palais Royale ==
In 1955, Toronto's Palais Royale was a popular dance hall for young white couples. That summer, staff at the Palais Royale intervened to prevent a Black man and a white woman from dancing together, humiliating them and ejecting them onto the street. According to Irish socialist Ernie Tate: "The couple had openly breached Toronto's unofficial form of segregation under which very little social mixing took place between blacks and whites. The Palais Royale was well known for its racist policies."

In response, activists in the black community organized picket lines to protest the incident. Danny Braithwaite, a young Black activist was one of the protest leaders. The black community was supported by Trotskyists and members of the CCF Youth Forum, who joined the picketers. Schulz recalled that she and a black male comrade entered the Palais in July and danced together without being challenged and the Palais was officially desegregated from that point on.

== Cuba solidarity ==
Inspired by the Cuban Revolution of 1959, Schulz also served on the executive of the Fair Play for Cuba Committee. The FPCC was instrumental in popularizing the Cuban revolution in Canada and ensuring that Canada did not adopt the US embargo against Cuba. Vern Olson, chairman of the committee at the time, recalls Schulz as "one of the heroic band who defended the Cuban revolution as it deepened, while others ran for cover."

Schulz visited Cuba in 1964 at the invitation of the Cuban Communist Party to celebrate the fifth anniversary of the revolution. She returned again in 1975 and 1983 with her daughter Katheryne. Katheryne attended Fidel Castro's funeral in 2016 and laid a wreath at his memorial on behalf of her mother and the FPCC. Katheryne wrote about her experience in Counterpunch and Rabble.

== Vietnam War ==
In her moving obituary, Monica Jones recalls that in 1966, Schulz was living in Montreal and organizing for the LSA-LSO. Jones writes: "She testified at a public enquiry into the conduct of Montreal police. The Montreal headquarters of the LSA-LSO had been raided earlier that year by police. Schulz told the enquiry: 'This raid occurs as the Ligue prepares for participation in the Student Days of Protest.... It is an obvious attempt to intimidate those who oppose both the presence of American troops in Vietnam and the role of the Canadian government in supporting American actions.' This was before the Anti-Vietnam War Movement grew to include millions in the late 1960s."

== Leaving the LSA-LSO ==
In 1971, the LSA-LSO decided to make the fight to repeal Canada's anti-abortion laws the primary focus of its work in the women's movement. Schulz supported the fight for abortion rights. But Schulz disagreed with what she saw as an inappropriately narrow approach. During the 1973 LSA-LSO pre-convention discussion, Schulz argued for de-emphasizing the abortion campaign, and for a strategy that would stress job-related issues and the fight for child care.

== Feminist Organizing ==
In 1972, after the death of her husband Peter, Pat moved to Toronto's Moss Park Housing Project with her daughter Katheryne. Widowed and diagnosed with cancer in 1971, Pat was on Family Benefits and living in a subsidized apartment. Katheryne attended her first demonstration around that time. Protestors gathered to defend Dominica activist Rosie Douglas who was facing deportation for organizing against racism in Montreal. Rosie would go on to become Prime Minister of Dominica.

Pat met like minded parents at Campus Community Co-operative Daycare, which was founded by activists who decided to take over a building at the University of Toronto and set up their own cooperative child care program. Schulz organized with other single mothers in Moss Park to set up an infant toddler program in Duke of York School, and a hot breakfast and hot lunch program. Family benefits, subsidized housing and subsidized child care were the safety net that saved her.

Schulz's experiences as a single parent in need of quality child care, inspired her to become involved in Ontario's child care movement. Over the next decade, Schulz became a founding member of Action Daycare and a prominent spokesperson for the child care movement. Action Daycare subsequently became the Ontario Coalition for Better Child Care. She spoke at union conventions, community meetings and demonstrations about the need for universal child care in Canada. She was also a key organizier in the fight to unionize Miniskools, a for profit chain that unsuccessfully tried to establish child care services in Ontario. Schulz wrote a regular child care column for Mudpie Magazine and published two articles, one about child care history and one about her experiences as a parent, in the anthology Good Daycare.

== University Education ==
Schulz had been trained as a teacher and a book keeper, but wanted to complete her university education. The provincial government of the day did not allow women on welfare to attend university, and Schulz was told to get training as a hairdresser instead. She and some other single mothers challenged the policy and won. Schulz went on to complete her master's degree in Canadian History at York University in 1975. Her thesis, The East York Worker's Association: A Response to the Great Depression, was published by New Hogtown Press the same year. It is one of the few historical accounts of poverty class organizing in Toronto.

== Final Years ==
In 1976, Schulz moved to the Bain Co-op Apartments in Toronto's Riverdale neighbourhood. The last five years of her life were marked by cancer. She spoke in Worth Every Minute about the surgeon who decided to perform a mastectomy on her without ever informing her that she could have had a less invasive lumpectomy instead. Outraged by the way she was treated, she wrote about the lack of weekend emergency care for cancer patients, being in pain for hours without relief, overcrowding, and having to beg for proper care. Her front-page article on June 28, 1980, in theToronto Star highlighted the inhumanity of capitalist medical care.

After Schulz's death, Mudpie columnist Chris Judge wrote a memorial column about Schulz's activism in the child care movement.

Schulz's friends including MPP Peter Tabuns, City Councillor Janet Davis and child care activist Ev McKee worked tirelessly to establish the Pat Schulz Child Care Centre which continues to operate in Toronto's east end.

== Publications ==
- 1974 Patricia Schulz. "Research Guide," in Acton, Janice et al. (eds.), Women at Work: Ontario 1850–1930. Toronto: Canadian Women's Educational Press.
- 1975 Patricia V. Schulz. The East York Workers' Association: A Response to the Great Depression. Toronto: New Hogtown Press.
- 1978 P. Schulz. "Daycare in Canada: 1860-1962," in K. Gallagher-Ross (ed.), Good Daycare. Toronto: Women's Educational Press.
- 1978 P. Schulz. “With a Little Help from Our Friends.” in K. Gallagher-Ross (ed.), Good Daycare. Toronto: Women's Educational Press.
