= Turnerites =

Under a variety of names and within a number of organizations over at least 17 years, the group around Harry Turner, or Turnerites was a presence within Trotskyism in the United States.

== History ==
The group originated in a controversy within the Spartacist League in the late 1960s. The leadership under James Robertson wanted the group to focus on organizing among students while Harry Turner wanted to organize a series of rank-and-file caucuses within labor unions, particularly minority workers, to oppose both employers and the union leadership. To this end Turner convinced the Spartacist League to create a pan-union Militant Labor Civil Rights Committee in September 1967. Robertson, however, had this group dissolved the next year and suggested that cadres form separate caucuses in their respective unions. The Spatacist League was wracked with factionalism over this issue during 1968 at the end of which the group led by Harry Turner was expelled. During this fight the Turnerites were allied with another faction that was attracted to the ideas of the French Lutte Ouvrière but they left to establish their own organization, Spark, before the Turnerites were finally expelled.

Once out of the Spartacist League the Turner group looked for another Trotskyist group to unite with. After brief flirtations with the Workers League of the United States and Lyndon LaRouche's SDS-Labor Committee the tendency grouped around its publication, the Vanguard Newsletter. The newsletter kept some of the ideas that Turner advocated within the Spartacist League, including the building of rank-and-file caucuses within the unions with the ultimate aim of turning them into workers' councils or soviets.

The Vanguard Newsletter group still shopped around for another organization to merge with. For a time they explored opportunities with various De Leonist groups that had left the Socialist Labor Party, Socialist Reconstruction and the Socialist Forum Group, but nothing ever came of it. In 1972 when the Leninist Faction left the Socialist Workers Party and formed the Class Struggle League (CSL) the Turnerites quickly made contact with it, even though it was in the process of negotiating with the Spartacists. After an attempt to unite the three groups was rejected by the SL, the Turnerites merged with the CSL. There were still controversies in the new organization. The majority former Leninist Faction members felt that the time had come to proclaim a Fifth International, while the minority from the Vanguard group wished to reconstruct the Fourth International. The minority and majority also differed on the nature of the Eastern European communist states with the later considering them deformed workers' states. On trade union work the first conference favored the idea of rank-and-file caucuses did not wish to build a national organization of such committees just yet, when there was no base for them.

The Class Struggle League dissolved in May 1975 with the former Leninist Faction group joining the Trotskyist Organization of the United States. The Turnerites reorganized into an independent group, the Trotskyist Organizing Committee (TOC). At this point it had around thirty members spread out in New York, Chicago, San Francisco and Texas. It began making overtures to other Trotskyist parties based on a five point programme: recognition of the counter-revolutionary role of Stalinism, for the Fourth International, for the Transitional Program, a national organization of rank-and-file trade union caucuses and formation of a labor party. They attempted mergers with the SWP, Spark, the Socialist League (Democratic Centralist) and the Revolutionary Workers League all to no avail.

Finally, in 1978, TOC was invited to join the Committee for a Revolutionary Socialist Party, an umbrella group of several Trotskyist organizations. It joined the group in November 1978. However, when the CSRP proclaimed its intention to form itself into a distinct political party adhering to democratic centralism in July 1980 the Turnerites left again, this time emerging as the Revolutionary Unity League

In January 1982 when the Morenoist faction of the Fourth International, International Workers League (Fourth International), was preparing its first world congress both the RUL and a group called the Revolutionary Workers Front sent representatives hoping to secure affiliation. With the encouragement of the leadership of the International the two groups set up a "leadership team" to co-ordinate joint strikes, demonstrations and campaigns. The two groups also had discussions where their political differences were hammered out and eventually planned a unification convention. This convention met on June 26–27, 1982 and a new organization, the Internationalist Workers Party (Fourth International) was founded.

However in July 1984 a severe factional crisis wracked the party with the eventual establishment of the International Socialist League (Fourth International) with Turner in the leadership. The IWP(FI) remained the official Morenoist affiliate in the United States, though the ISL(FI) remained a "sympathizing section". The ISL(FI) began publishing a newspaper, Workers Organizer, in November 1985, stating it had branches in New York, Los Angeles, Minneapolis and Wisconsin.

== Publications ==
- Vanguard Newsletter New York, N.Y.: Independent revolutionary socialists, Vol. 1, no. 1 (June 1969)-v. 5, no. 3 (Apr. 1973)
- Socialist appeal New York, N.Y.: Trotskyist Organizing Committee, Vol. 1, no. 1 (Aug. 1975)-v. 3, no. 10 (Nov. 16, 1978).
- Spartacist League split [New York? : s.n., 1968
- Theory, tasks & tactics: the program of the Class Struggle League Chicago, Ill. : The League, #1 (includes Political Resolution adopted at the Fusion Convention of Vanguard Newsletter and the Class Struggle League, April 20–22, 1973)
- Leninism and democratic centralism. Chicago, Ill. : The League, #2 (Contains the Resolution on Democratic Centralism and the CSL Constitution adopted at the Fusion Convention of Vanguard Newsletter and the Class Struggle League, April 20–22, 1973)
- ITU: union in crisis Chicago, Ill.: The League, #3
