= Ligue trotskyste de France =

- Founded: mid 1970s
- Newspaper: Le Bolchévik
- Ideology: Communism; Trotskyism
- Political position: Far-left
- International affiliation: International Communist League (Fourth Internationalist)

Website
- iclfi.org/fra

The Ligue trotskyste de France is a French Trotskyist group. It is a section of the International Communist League (Fourth Internationalist) or "Spartacist" tendency.

The LTF was founded in the mid 1970s, reportedly after members of the Spartacist League (US) started proslytizating in France. The LTF campaigned against the Union of the Left during the 1978 French legislative election, considering the coalition a popular front. In the 1981 elections it offered the French Communist Party leader Georges Marchais "savagely critical support" if he ran against François Mitterrand. They later condemned him for keeping the PFC in the Union of the Left.

In 1980 the LTF launched a periodical, Le Bolchévik edited by William Cazenove. Through the 1980s the group continued to support the positions of the international Spartacist movement, i.e., opposition to Solidarity, support of the Soviet–Afghan War and opposition to Khomeini.

In the summer of 2017, the ICL (therefore the 'LTF' in France) questioned its past, believing that it had been, in the person of "a number of American cadres" penetrated by "the chauvinist Hydra" since 1974
