= Tous =

Tous may refer to:

- Tous (company), a Spanish jewelry designer
- Tous, Iran
- Tous, Valencia, a municipality of the province of Valencia, Valencia Community, Spain
- Tous son of Nowzar
- Trotskyist Organization of the United States (TOUS), an American Trotskyist group
- Tous (mammal), a genus of marsupials

== People ==
- Paco Tous (born 1964), Spanish actor
- Xisca Tous Servera (born 1992) Spanish-Turkish triathlete
