= Spartacist =

Spartacist may refer to:

- An ancient supporter of Spartacus, who led a slave rebellion against the Roman Republic
- The Spartacus League, a left-wing Marxist revolutionary movement in Germany during and just after World War I
- The modern Spartacist League, also known as the International Communist League, a Trotskyist international organisation
