= International Communist League (Fourth Internationalist) =

Trotskyist international

- Abbreviation: ICL(FI)
- Founded: 1974
- Headquarters: New York
- Newspaper: Spartacist
- Membership: 10 affiliated groups (2017)
- Ideology: Communism; Trotskyism
- Political position: Far-left

Website
- iclfi.org

The International Communist League (Fourth Internationalist) abbreviated as ICL(FI), earlier known as the international Spartacist tendency (iSt), is a Trotskyist international. Its largest constituent party is the Spartacist League (US). There are smaller sections of the ICL (FI) in Mexico, Canada, France, Germany, Ireland, Italy, Japan, South Africa, Australia, Greece and the United Kingdom.

The group originated within the Revolutionary Tendency of the Socialist Workers Party in the United States and, upon its expulsion from the SWP, it named itself Spartacist in 1964 in homage to the original Spartacist League in World War I Germany, co-led by Rosa Luxemburg and Karl Liebknecht.

== History ==
The ICL-FI traces its origins to a factional struggle within the U.S. Socialist Workers Party in the early 1960s. In 1962–63, James Robertson and others organized the Revolutionary Tendency inside the SWP, which opposed the SWP leadership’s orientation on the Cuban Revolution and its move toward reunification with the United Secretariat of the Fourth International (the so-called "Pabloites"). Initially, the Spartacists aligned with the International Committee of the Fourth International (ICFI), although relations later broke down.

Following suspensions and expulsions in late 1963–early 1964, they launched the journal Spartacist in 1964 and formally founded the Spartacist League (U.S.) in 1966.

The international current of the Spartacist League was organized in 1974 as the "international Spartacist tendency", which in 1989 was renamed the "International Communist League (Fourth Internationalist)".

== Publications ==
The central theoretical journal of the ICL(FI) is Spartacist which is published in four languages approximately once a year. Apart from the above the ICL(FI)'s American section, the Spartacist League, operates the Prometheus Research Library in New York City. The library has published a number of bulletins and books and houses the tendency's archives and other material on the history of Trotskyism.

In addition to Spartacist the national sections of the ICL(FI) each publish a regular paper of varying regularity. For example, the U.S. group publishes the newspaper Workers Vanguard, which is known for its acerbic running commentary on the activities of other leftist groups, its sarcastic wit, and its obituaries of leftist figures whose lives often are inadequately analyzed and/or memorialized in the mainstream media, recently including Bill Epton, Richard Fraser, Robert F. Williams, and Myra Tanner Weiss. Since the 1990s Workers Vanguard has also featured original essays on the history of Marxist and pre-Marxist radical ideas written by long-time member Mark Tishman under the name Joseph Seymour. From time to time Workers Vanguard also carries features under the rubrics Women and Revolution and Young Spartacus, these being the titles of once separate publications since discontinued.

== Positions ==
=== Regarding domestic policy ===
Since the early 1980s the League and affiliates have also organized mobilizations against Nazis and the Ku Klux Klan. They were an early campaigner to save Mumia Abu-Jamal from death row. The Spartacist League regards what they term the "struggle for black liberation" as central to communist revolution in the U.S.; to that end, they promote "revolutionary integrationism" and also prominently support the right to bear arms. The party is radically permissive with regards to sexuality and culture, opposing all the laws which prohibit consensual sexual relations. In addition Their British section was for the decriminalization of prostitution, drug use, gambling, pornography, homosexual sex which they regard as "crimes without victims" and are "generally illegal or heavily regulated under capitalist law."

=== Regarding similar groups ===
The League rejects left-wing political coalitions and campaigns believing they are popular fronts aimed at providing platforms for bourgeois politicians from the Democratic Party and the U.S. Green Party, a strategy the SL's ideas abhor. Instead, the League denounces all support to "capitalist parties", especially the left-wing ones founded through popular front formation, and instead argue for an independent workers' party aiming for state power.

The Spartacists also devote much attention to polemicizing against other communist and socialist groups. These polemics are usually exceptionally forceful and are often seen by the groups being attacked as unnecessarily disruptive of their activities. The Spartacist League is also highly critical of groups associated with the reunified Fourth International, whose politics they characterize as Pabloite.

In a book entitled Death Agony of the Fourth International, Workers Power and the Irish Workers' Group claim the iSt's strategy was/is based on, and they quote from an iSt document, "destroying" other left wing groups. They claim this involves occupying rooms where other left groups are due to have meetings as well as other methods. Furthermore, they argue that the Spartacists, while developing a correct position that the SWP were centrist, did not recognise that the Fourth International had degenerated before it split, and therefore were more critical of one section than of the other.

=== On Islamic states ===
The Socialist Workers' Party supported Ayatollah Khomeini during the Islamic Revolution in Iran as "anti-imperialist", but the Spartacists gave no support to this. The League was one of the few communist groups other than the Workers World Party to hail the Soviet invasion of Afghanistan in 1979 and the occupation that followed. At the time the Spartacists believed it provided an opportunity to extend the gains of the October Revolution to the Afghan people, especially women, in a struggle against the misogynistic Islamic fundamentalists of the U.S.-backed Mujahideen. Later, when the U.S. intervention led to the formation of the successive Islamic governments of the Mujahideen and the Taliban, the League echoed its condemnation of the Islamic Revolution in Iran and denounced these governments as theocratic, capitalist and anti-woman.

=== On socialist states ===
The League also fought hard in mobilizing to defend the Soviet Union and East Germany from what they termed capitalist counterrevolution. Their group in Germany waged a campaign in 1989 calling for political revolution against Stalinism and opposition to the capitalist reunification. Today, the Spartacists defend what they see as the remaining deformed workers' states and have called for the defense of North Korea's right to nuclear arms as a necessary component keeping it free of U.S. military intervention. This is a continuation of their earlier positions on what they consider the deformed workers' states of the Republic of Cuba, the Democratic People's Republic of Korea, Socialist Republic of Vietnam, and the People's Republic of China. On these countries they continue to call for political revolution against the ruling communist parties while at the same time calling for the defense of these revolutions from imperialism and internal capitalist counter-revolution.

=== On lockdowns ===
In April 2021 the League issued a Supplement to the Spartacist publication ('Down With the Lockdowns!') in which it announced its opposition to the COVID-19 lockdowns measures established to reduce the spread of COVID-19, describing these as a "reactionary public health measure" that had caused mass unemployment, and counterposing these measures to 'union control of safety'.

== History ==
=== Background ===
The first Spartacist League, founded in 1966 with James Robertson as national chairman, developed in the United States from the Revolutionary Tendency that had emerged within the Socialist Workers Party. Among their criticisms of the SWP was its embrace of "Pabloism" and its decision to leave the International Committee of the Fourth International and join the United Secretariat of the Fourth International. After its expulsion from the SWP both the Spartacists and the American Committee for the Fourth International were considered affiliates of the ICFI. However, at the 1966 London Conference of the ICFI the positions of the Spartacists were condemned and the ACFI was recognized as the only American ICFI section.

=== Establishing an International ===
The American Spartacists remained isolated until Bill Logan formed another Spartacist League in New Zealand in the early 1970s. Logan later expanded the group to become the Spartacist League of Australia and New Zealand. The two groups signed a "Declaration for the organizing of an International Trotskyist Tendency" in July 1974 which proclaimed the combined central committees an International Executive Committee and an International Secretariat as its executive arm.

=== International Spartacist tendency ===
The iSt held its first international conference in England in the summer of 1979. Delegates attended from the United States, Great Britain, Australia, New Zealand, Germany, France and Canada. There were also fraternal delegates from the Revolutionary Workers Party of Ceylon led by Edmund Samarakkody and the Lega trotskista d'Italia. They attempted to recruit both groups to their tendency, but only succeeded with the latter. A new International Executive Committee was also elected.

By the 1985 conference of the iSt an "external tendency" had split from the iSt, that would go on to form the International Bolshevik Tendency. This group had adherents in the US, Canada and Germany. Initially based in the San Francisco Bay area and Toronto the ET was to define itself as a public faction of the SL and sought to be readmitted to the ranks of the parent organization. Said efforts were rebuffed by the SL who have since waged a polemical war with the ET and its successor groups.

The iSt changed its name to the International Communist League (Fourth Internationalist) in 1989 and adopted a new Declaration of Principles and Some Elements of Program International Communist League (Fourth Internationalist) in February 1998.

After the collapse of the USSR, the organization sent its representatives to Russia and Ukraine to find like-minded people and create its own sections in the countries. In 1992, a member of the Spartacist League, Marta Philipps, was killed in Moscow. The crime was not solved. The mission itself in Russia continued to operate until 1996, but ended in failure. In 1997, the Customs of Ukraine stopped a group with a large number of leaflets. After that, the group was expelled from Ukraine and the iSt-mission in Ukraine was terminated.

In the summer of 2017, the ICL questioned its past, believing that it had been, in the person of "a number of American cadres" penetrated by "the chauvinist Hydra" since 1974.

=== Later splits ===
In 1996, Workers Vanguard editor Jan Norden and other founders of the League for the Fourth International were expelled, allegedly for maneuvering with a group from Brazil involved in bringing court suit against a trade union.

The Australian section of the Spartacist League, which had previously been involved in IBT events, split again in 2005, with one member leaving to found the Trotskyist Platform.

== Sections ==
The current members of the ICL include:

- Spartacist Group Japan
- Spartacist League of Britain
- Spartacist League/U.S.
- Trotskyist Group of Greece
- Trotskyist League in Quebec and Canada
- Spartacist League of Australia (Now a faction of the Revolutionary Communist Organisation/Communist Unity)
- Spartakist-Arbeiterpartei Deutschlands
- Spartacist Group Ireland
- Lega Trotskista d'Italia
- Grupo Espartaquista de México
- Spartacist/South Africa
- Ligue trotskyste de France

Former sections include:

- Spartakusowska Grupa Polski
- Spartacist League of Israel
- Spartacist League/Lanka

== See also ==
- List of Trotskyist internationals
