= New International (magazine) =

Magazine of Marxist theory

Magazine logo

The New International is a magazine of Marxist theory published first by the Socialist Workers Party of the United States (SWP) from 1934 to 1940, then by the Workers Party from 1940 to 1958, and then revived by the SWP since 1983.

== Current format ==
Since the magazine's resumption in 1983, The New International has included articles written by leaders of the 'Pathfinder tendency' which left the Fourth International in the 1980s. Content focuses on speeches and resolutions of the SWP's biannual conference, and archival documents by Bolshevik and Castroist communists. It is now published roughly once every two years.

The magazine's last publication (online) was a 2008 issue with a covers story entitled "Revolution, Internationalism, and Socialism: The Last Year of Malcolm X" by Jack Barnes. Other articles were: "The Clintons' Antilabor Legacy: Roots of the 2008 World Financial Crisis", "The Stewardship of Nature Also Falls to the Working Class", and "Setting the Record Straight on Fascism and World War II: Building a World Federation of Democratic Youth that Fights Imperialism and War".

== History ==
Martin Abern and Max Shachtman founded the magazine in 1934.

When Shachtman and his associates split from the SWP to form the Workers Party in 1940, they brought the journal to the new organization: an action regarded by the SWP as theft. The SWP replaced New International with Fourth International, later called International Socialist Review.

The New International Publishing Company published the magazine from 1934 to 1958 as "a monthly organ of revolutionary Marxism." From 1934 to 1949, it published monthly. Publication suspended from July 1936 to December 1937 and also in Jan. 1940. In this period, publishers changed several times:

- January 1935 - June 1936: Workers Party of the U.S.
- January 1938 - April 1940: Socialist Workers Party
- May 1940 - May 1949: Workers Party of the U.S.
- May 1949 - Spring/Summer 1958: Independent Socialist League

In the September–October 1952 issue, the major advertiser was the Labor Action Book Service (named after the ISL's newspaper).

The New International was discontinued around the time that the Shachtmanites entered the Socialist Party of America in 1958.

In 1983, the SWP refounded the magazine in co-operation with the Revolutionary Workers League in Canada.

== Editors and contributors ==
The magazine's current editors are Mary-Alice Waters, Steve Clark and Jack Barnes. Assisting them are seven international consultants.

The original editors in 1934 were the magazines founders, Martin Abern and Max Shachtman.

In its initial period (1934–1958), the magazine's editors (or editorial board in the absence of listed editors) were:

- July 1934 to December 1934: Max Shachtman
- January 1935 to June 1936: Max Shachtman and John West (James Burnham)
- January 1938 to March 1939: board of James Burnham, Max Shachtman, and Maurice Spector
- April 1939 to March 1940: board James Burnham and Max Shachtman
- May 1940 to September 1941: Max Shachtman
- Oct. 1941 to June 1943: Albert Gates (Albert Glotzer)
- July 1943 to August 1945: Max Shachtman
- September 1945 to May 1946: Ernest Erber (sometimes Shachtman as “editor”)
- August 1947 to December 1947: Albert Gates (Albert Glotzer)
- January 1948 to March 1949: Hal Draper
- April 1949 to December 1949: Max Shachtman
- January–February 1950 to January–February 1953: Emmanuel Garrett (Shachtman as “formal editor”)
- March–April 1952 to 1958: Julius Falk as managing editor (Shachtman as “editor”)

The September–October 1952 issue lists Shachtman as editor and Julius Falk as managing editor. Contributors include: Gordon Haskell, G. Zinoviev, and Albert Gates (Albert Glotzer). Forthcoming issues would have contributions from Ben Hall, Shachtman, and Zinoviev.
