= Robert Taber =

Robert Taber may refer to:

- Robert Taber (actor) (1865–1904), American actor
- Robert Taber (author) (1919–1995), American journalist, political scholar, and writer
