= Mary-Alice Waters =

American socialist

Mary-Alice Waters (born 1942) is a socialist and activist in the United States.

Waters became involved in Trotskyist politics at a young age, and joined the Socialist Workers Party (SWP) in the fall of 1962 while a student at Carleton College in Minnesota. She became the editor of their youth paper, Young Socialist, and the national secretary of the Young Socialist Alliance.

In the early 1980s, Waters, along with Jack Barnes and others in the SWP leadership, began to reject the label of "Trotskyism" and the theory of Permanent Revolution, in favour of building links with the Cuban Communist Party and Sandinista National Liberation Front.

In December 1968, she joined the editorial staff of The Militant and was named managing editor in 1969 and editor in chief in January, 1971.

Today, Waters is the President of the Pathfinder Press and the editor of New International magazine. She has written a handful of books, published by Pathfinder, on political topics.

== Books ==
- Feminism and the Marxist Movement. New York: Pathfinder Press, 1972. ISBN 9780873482417
- Making History: Interviews with Four Generals of Cuba's Revolutionary Armed Forces. New York: Pathfinder Press, 1999. ISBN 9780873489027
- Women in Cuba: the Making of a Revolution within the Revolution. New York: Pathfinder Press, 2012. ISBN 9781604880366
- Labor, Nature, and the Evolution of Humanity: the Long View of History. New York: Pathfinder Press, 2021. ISBN 978-1604881202
