= Jerry White (socialist) =

American politician (born 1959)

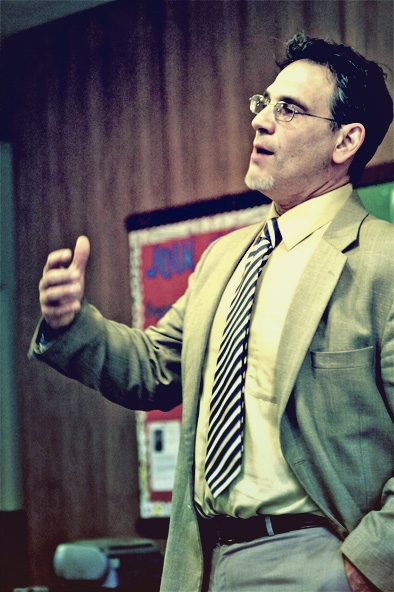
- White in 2008
- Born: Jerome White; 1959 (age 66–67); Queens, New York, US
- Occupation: Journalist
- Known for: Socialist politics

Jerome "Jerry" White (born 1959) is an American politician and journalist who is the labor editor reporting for the World Socialist Web Site. He is a member of the Socialist Equality Party of the United States and before that a member of its predecessor, the Workers League, joining the movement in 1979. White was the SEP's nominee for president four times, running in 1996, 2008, 2012, and 2016.

In February 2024, SEP National Chairman David North announced White would run in the 2024 election as the party's candidate for vice president of the United States. His running mate on the ticket was Joseph Kishore.

== Career ==
White authored a book, published in 1990, entitled Death on the Picket Line: The Story of John McCoy. The book, an investigative report, is about the killing of a militant coal miner, McCoy, as well as the history of the United Mine Workers (UMW) in West Virginia.

== Election campaigns (1996-2016) ==
In 1996, White ran as the first presidential candidate for the newly-formed Socialist Equality Party (SEP) with vice presidential candidate Fred Mazelis.

In 2006, White ran for Michigan's 12th Congressional district seat as an SEP candidate.

In 2008, White ran as the SEP presidential candidate with vice-presidential candidate Bill Van Auken. The write-in campaign was accompanied by a redesign of the Socialist Equality Party's website, which would rehost articles written by both candidates for the World Socialist Web Site. During his campaign White criticised the bailout plan for banks following the 2008 financial crisis, saying it rewarded those who caused it.

White also ran on behalf of the SEP in 2012, appearing on the ballot in two states.

In 2016, White ran as the SEP presidential candidate with vice presidential candidate Niles Niemuth.
