= Nanette Rainone =

American radio presenter and programmer (1942-2016)

- Born: December 4, 1942
- Died: May 23, 2016 (aged 73)
- Education: Queens College
- Occupations: reporter and radio programmer

Nanette Rainone (December 4, 1942 – May 23, 2016) was an American reporter and programmer at the New York radio station WBAI in the 1960s and 1970s. She created some of the first programs on feminism and women’s issues. She worked on the mayoral campaign of Bella Abzug and founded Brooklyn Information & Culture (BRIC).

== Early life and education ==
Nanette Rainone was born on December 4, 1942, in Queens, New York. She attended Newtown High School in Queens. She earned a degree in English from Queens College in 1965. At college she was active in the Student Peace Union and the Fair Play for Cuba Committee. She left graduate school after marrying.

== Radio career ==
Rainone created “Womankind,” a feminist news and information radio show that included interviews. She followed this with “Electra Rewired,” a live program broadcast from night to dawn and produced entirely by women for women. In 1970, Rainone the program “Consciousness Raising,” a discussion-format show in which seven women gathered to talk about a variety of topics. She also produced “The Sex Programme,” in which listeners could call in and seek advice from sex therapists.

She became the head programmer for WBAI in 1971.

== Later career ==
Rainone left WBAI in 1976. She worked on the mayoral campaign of Representative Bella Abzug. She became the communications director for Howard Golden, the Brooklyn borough president, and created the Fund for the Borough of Brooklyn, later renamed as Brooklyn Information and Culture. The fund supported free cultural programs and performances as a way to attract visitors to Brooklyn, such as the Celebrate Brooklyn! festival and the Rotunda Gallery, a venue for Brooklyn artists. The fund was instrumental in bringing Judy Chicago's Dinner Party to Chicago. It also funds the Brooklyn Public Network, a community access television network. She was president of the fund until 2002.

== Personal life ==
While in graduate school she married Ralph Blumenfled, a reporter for the New York Post. They divorced. She later married Harvey W. Schultz, who was New York City's commissioner of environmental protection during Edward I. Koch's last mayoral term. Rainone died May 23, 2016.
