= Lega Trotskista d'Italia =

Lega trotskista d'Italia
- Founded: April 1978
- Newspaper: Spartaco
- Ideology: Communism; Trotskyism
- Political position: Far-left
- International affiliation: International Communist League (Fourth Internationalist)

Website
- iclfi.org/ita

The Lega trotskista d'Italia or Trotskyist League of Italy is an Italian Trotskyist group. It is the Italian section of the International Communist League (Fourth Internationalist), or "Spartacist" tendency within international Trotskyism.

The Italian Spartacists came from two different organizational splits. One was formed in 1975 from dissidents of the Revolutionary Marxist Fraction led by Roberto Massari who announced the creation of a Spartacist Nucleus at the July 1975 European encampment of the international Spartacist tendency.

The other group had its origins in the Gruppi Comunisti Rivoluzionari, the Italian party affiliated with the United Secretariat of the Fourth International. This group left in 1976 in protest over the LCRs endorsement of the Proletarian Democracy electoral coalition, which it regarded as a kind of popular front. This group first called itself the Bolshevik-Leninist Group for the Reconstruction of the Fourth International. It adopted the name Trotkyist League of Italy in April 1978, bey which time it had absorbed the Spartacist Nucleus. It also attempted to unify with the ex-Lambertist Bolshevik-Leninist Group of Italy, but nothing came of this.

The LTI grew closer to the international Spartacist tendency, sending a fraternal delegate to its first international conference in London in August 1979 and officially became its Italian sympathizing section in August 1980. Some members were not happy with this however. After the first conference they founded with International Proletarian Opposition within the LTI and in April 1980 left to form the Gruppo Operaio Rivoluzionario per la rinascita della Quarta Internazionale.

By the early 1980s the LTI was centered in Milan where they published their monthly periodical Spartaco.
