= Odessa Cox =

American businesswoman (1922–2001)

- Born: Odessa Brown; June 8, 1922; Whatley, Alabama, U.S.
- Died: October 27, 2001 (aged 79); Los Angeles, California, U.S.
- Occupations: Businesswoman, activist, pacifist
- Known for: Founder, Los Angeles Southwest College

Odessa Brown Cox (June 8, 1922 – October 27, 2001) was an American businesswoman and activist based in Watts, Los Angeles. She was a founder of Los Angeles Southwest College (LASC).

== Early life ==
Brown was born in Whatley, Alabama, the daughter of Chester Lee Brown and Alma Burroughs Brown. Her father was a labor organizer.

== Career ==
=== Educational activism in Watts ===
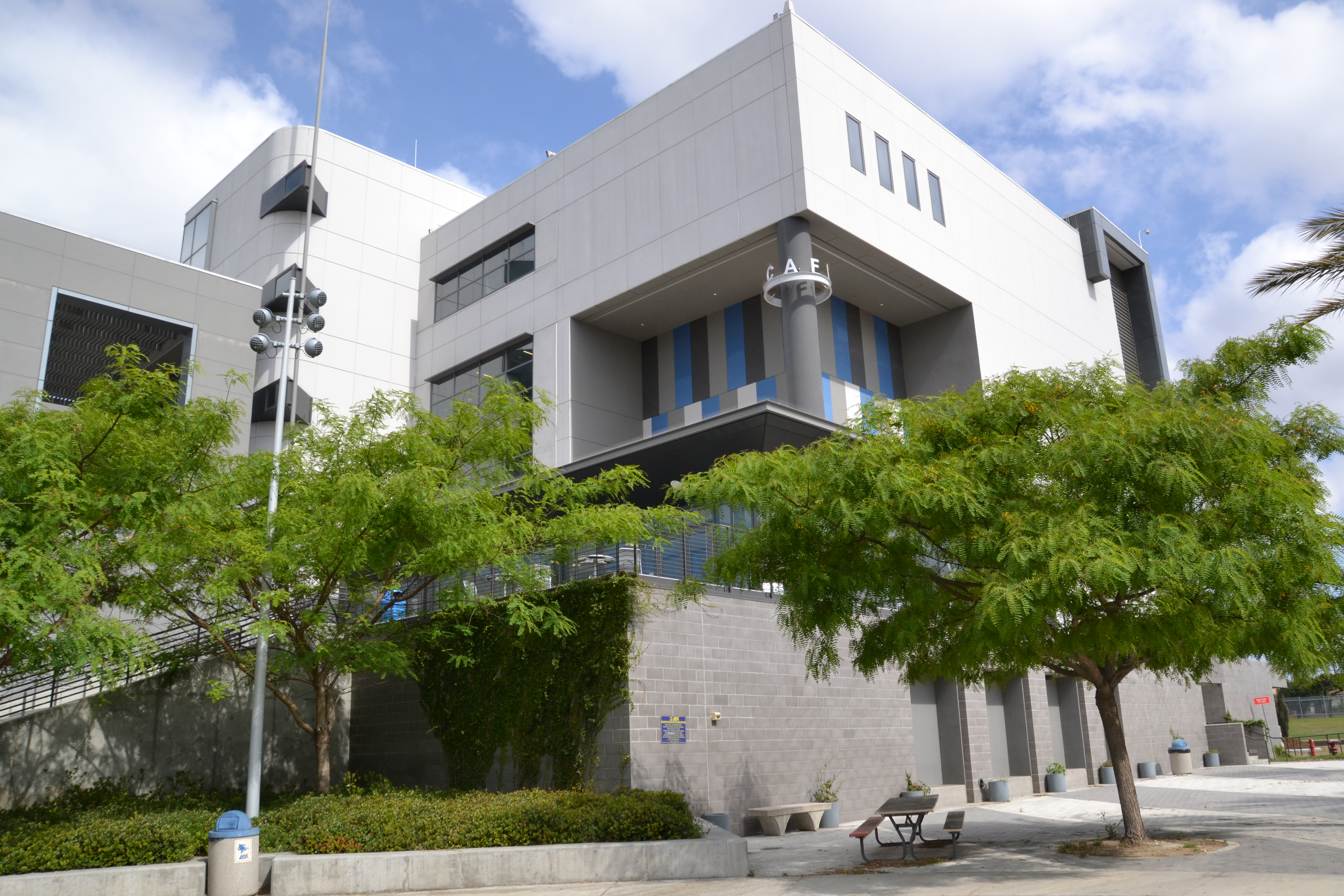
The Cox Building at Los Angeles Southwest College, in 2018

Cox and her husband ran a dry cleaning business in the Watts neighborhood of Los Angeles for almost fifty years. She was a parent activist in Watts, working to build a junior high school and improve Black representation in California textbooks. She was part of the campaign to establish a California State University campus near South Central Los Angeles, which became California State University, Dominguez Hills.

As chair of the Southwest Junior College committee, she was recognized as "principal founder" of Los Angeles Southwest College when it opened in 1967. The first permanent campus building was named for her in 1973. "I didn't do this alone," she later recalled. "I might have conceived the idea, but from the beginning to end it took a lot of dedicated souls to bring the physical property you see today from an idea to reality."

=== Peace and politics ===
Cox was active in California Democratic and Progressive party politics, and in the Los Angeles chapter of the World Peace Council. In 1960, she toured Cuba with the Fair Play for Cuba Committee; "I wanted to see for myself if there is any place under the sun where there isn't discrimination," she told a newspaper about that trip. She signed the Fair Play for Cuba Committee's "A Declaration of Conscience by Afro-Americans", published in newspapers in 1961.

Cox ran unsuccessfully for a seat on the Los Angeles City Junior College District board in 1969. She represented Los Angeles as a delegate to a meeting of the World Assembly of Builders of Peace in Poland in 1977. She chaired the United Front for Justice in South Africa, and was active in the American Association of Afro-American Relations. She was an organizer of the Southeast Interracial Council. The Los Angeles Sentinel named her Mother of the Year in 2001.

== Personal life and legacy ==
Brown married Raymond Cox in 1941, and the couple moved to Los Angeles in 1943. They had three daughters. She used a wheelchair in her last years, after surviving a stroke. Her husband died in 1994, and she died in 2001, at the age of 79. LASC holds an annual Odessa Cox Forum.
