= Spartacist League/U.S. =

American Trotskyist socialist organization

- Founded: 1964; 62 years ago
- Split from: Socialist Workers Party
- Newspaper: Workers Vanguard
- Ideology: Communism; Trotskyism
- Political position: Far-left
- International affiliation: International Communist League (Fourth Internationalist)

Website
- iclfi.org/usa

The Spartacist League/U.S. (SL, SLUS, or SL/US) is a Trotskyist political grouping which is the United States section of the International Communist League (Fourth Internationalist), formerly the International Spartacist Tendency. This Spartacist League named themselves after the original Spartacus League of Weimar Republic in Germany, but has no formal descent from it. The League self-identifies as a "revolutionary communist" organization.

In the United States, the group is small but very vocal, and its activities within leftist-activist coalitions and wide-scale social justice protest movements usually focus on presenting a pole for regroupment and recruitment of subjective revolutionaries on the basis of an internationalist, Bolshevik-Leninist program.

== History ==
=== Background ===
The origins of the Spartacist League go back to a left-wing tendency within the Young Socialist League, which was linked to the Independent Socialist League led by Max Shachtman, in the 1950s. This group objected to Shachtman's plans to merge the ISL with the Socialist Party-Social Democratic Federation and the YSL with the Young People's Socialist League. This "left wing caucus" was then persuaded to join the Socialist Workers Party's youth group, American Youth for Socialism, in a larger, theoretically independent, Young Socialist Alliance in 1960.

A central influence in the recruitment of the former Shachtmanite youth leaders to the Socialist Workers Party (SWP) was Murry Weiss who, together with Myra Tanner Weiss, would be among the few older members of the SWP to speak up when the newly recruited youth were later expelled. Another important influence on the emerging tendency was Dick Fraser, who developed the theory of revolutionary integrationism, later adopted by the Spartacist League, which argued that blacks in the USA constituted a color-caste who could be fully integrated into society only as a result of a social revolution overthrowing capitalism. Like the Weisses, Fraser would exit the SWP in the mid-1960s, going on to lead the Freedom Socialist Party. Also important in the early days were Shane Mage and Geoff White, who had a background in the Communist Party.

By 1960 this grouping, mostly active in the youth group associated with the SWP, had become worried by what they saw as the opportunism of the leadership of the SWP headed by Farrell Dobbs and by overtures by the SWP to the International Secretariat of the Fourth International. Particular issues in the dispute included the character of the Cuban revolution, characterized by the majority as a "healthy workers' state", and proper orientation towards the Civil Rights Movement, where the majority attitude was that of uncritical support of the growing turn toward black nationalism among African-American militants.

=== Split from the SWP ===
Rather than continue as leadership of the youth group, faction leader James Robertson and the others formed an opposition caucus named the Revolutionary Tendency and made clear their loyalty to the International Committee of the Fourth International (ICFI) in 1962. Differences developed in the Revolutionary Tendency as to how to characterise the SWP, leading to a split within the caucus. A minority closer to the ICFI left to form the Reorganised Minority Tendency (RMT), led by Tim Wohlforth, just as the Robertson-led grouping was being expelled from the SWP. The RMT played a role in the expulsion of the Robertson grouping, on grounds of "party disloyalty".

Under the party name "Lyn Marcus," Lyndon LaRouche was briefly a member of the Revolutionary Tendency and then of the American Committee for the Fourth International (ultimately, opposed to the Spartacist League) as he circulated through various groupings on the Left in the 1960s. Years later, in early 1972, the SL published a two-part article declaring LaRouche's Labor Committee to be "Crackpot Social Democracy," followed in the spring of 1973 by a polemic against the LaRouche organization as "Scientology for Social Democrats".

Having been expelled from the SWP in 1964, the Robertson group launched a theoretical journal entitled Spartacist, from which they would later take their name. They still stressed their loyalty to the International Committee for the Fourth International, and attended that body's conference held in London, England, in 1966, only to find themselves shut out from the conference's ranks. From that point on, the Spartacists regarded themselves as the only truly "orthodox" Trotskyist tendency, criticizing the SWP, the ICFI and various other rivals from the left.

Robertson considered his group to be the true political heirs of SWP founding leader James Cannon but he maintained a fidelity to some of the left criticisms of SWP positions made during World War II by Max Shachtman after the latter's break with official Trotskyism. These Shachtmanisms included a disagreement with the SWP's (and Leon Trotsky's) "Proletarian Military Policy" (a World War II call for workers control of the American military) and a disagreement about the political legitimacy of supporting Chiang Kai-Shek's nationalists against the Japanese given Chiang's alliance with American imperialism. Robertson's long-held view that the "interpenetrated peoples" of Israel/Palestine have equal rights to national self-determination is also far closer to the stance taken toward the foundation of Israel by Shachtman's WP than that of Cannon's SWP.

On some issues, Robertson's SL retroactively criticized the tactics of parties in Trotsky's Fourth International from the left. For example, Trotskyists of Trotsky's day sometimes gave "critical support" to labor or socialist parties running in electoral blocs with bourgeois or petit-bourgeois parties. The SL condemns this as capitulation to Popular Front politics.

In the summer of 2017, the ICL questioned its past, believing that it had been, in the person of "a number of American cadres", penetrated by "the chauvinist Hydra" since 1974.

=== Setbacks ===
Following founding of the Spartacist League, the small group found itself isolated and failed to recruit new members. This resulted in a degree of demoralisation on the part of some members including the group's leading West Coast figure, Geoff White, who resigned in 1968. By this time another leading figure, Shane Mage, had also quit the group.

Meanwhile, the New York branch was developing work in the unions through the Militant Labor Civil Rights Committee. This work being advocated by Harry Turner and Kay Ellens, who had spent a year working with Voix Ouvrière in France. Robertson opposed the MLCRC and a faction fight developed which ended when a most of the minority, that is those who supported Ellens, resigned from the League in time founding The Spark group. Harry Turner tried to forestall this split and briefly remained in the Spartacists and formed a faction. Turner and his remaining two supporters split off within a few months and began publishing Vanguard Newsletter. By the end of this split, James Robertson was the only leader of the former Revolutionary Tendency to remain central to the League.

Another group, many veterans of the SL "Revolutionary Contingent" and active in the Coalition for an Anti-Imperialist Movement, split to form the Revolutionary Communist League in 1968. Sympathetic to the idea of "armed self defense" and "unconditional defense of the workers states" the RCL merged with the Workers World Party later that year. They left the WWP in 1971, and reconstituted themselves as the Revolutionary Communist League (Internationalist).

=== Early activities and expansion ===
Initially the Spartacists sought to intervene in the Civil Rights protests, on the basis of their support for the idea of revolutionary integrationism, but as small as they were, this activity floundered. They also developed a small presence in the Students for a Democratic Society; within the SDS they opposed all the major factions that developed from that body as these factions turned more and more towards Maoist ideas by 1969.

As the student and anti-Vietnam war movements passed their late 1960s peak the Spartacists did begin to recruit from the then large milieu of radicalised students. This led to substantial growth and the development of a national presence as they expanded from their initial branches in New York and the San Francisco Bay Area. In part this process involved the recruitment of former students who had formed local Maoist collectives which had then come across Trotskyist ideas, including the Communist Working Collective, led by Marv Treiger, in southern California and Buffalo Marxist Collective, led by Jan Norden, in Buffalo, New York.

Some years time later they recruited a not dissimilar "Gay Left" group based in Los Angeles called the Red Flag Union (formerly known as the Lavender and Red Union). Throughout the 1970s the Spartacists did develop a series of what they described as exemplary interventions in industry and the trade unions. For example, there were supporters involved with the ILWU in the Bay Area, the automotive industry in California, the telephone industry and others.

Modest growth continued through the early to mid-1970s. In 1975, the Spartacist League founded the Partisan Defense Committee as "a class-struggle, non-sectarian legal and social defense organization that champions cases and causes in the interests of the whole of the working people" working in accordance with the political positions of the Spartacist League and working in the tradition of the International Labor Defense organization established by the Communist Party in the 1920s.

=== Fragmentation ===
The late 1970s saw the growth of the league stalled as the radical tide of the 1960s began to ebb. Major internal factional struggles in the group have developed from time to time. These tended to lead to the departure of the dissenting minority.

In 1972, the life of the organization was punctuated by the loss of several leading cadres. Dissatisfied with the group's regime, some senior members gathered around Moore, Stewart, Dave Cunningham, and Marv Treiger. They challenged Robertson only to find themselves expelled from the SL. They then formed a short-lived organization, the International Group, which issued a single pamphlet and then dissolved. The SL reissued the dissidents' pamphlet as part of their series Hate Trotskyism, Hate the Spartacist League. That split did not interrupt the growth of the League. Critics have argued that the unchallenged domination of Jim Robertson dates from the 1972 purge.

In 1978, a number of leading young male members, including Young Spartacus editor Sam Issacharoff, were targeted by Robertson, who nicknamed them "clones" because they were supposedly of the same ilk as longtime SL "theoretician" Joseph Seymour. Robertson saw them as petty bourgeois intellectuals who might eventually become a dissident faction. Issacharoff (who later became an NYU law professor) and several others subsequently left the organization. This episode was later referred to by the International Bolshevik Tendency (IBT) as "the Clone Purge".

For the Spartacist League these were years of retrenchment in the face of what it saw as a worldwide offensive on the part of the capitalist class. While it maintained its (sometimes intensive) polemical efforts directed at the members of what they described as Ostensibly Revolutionary Organisations, ORO's for short, it began to withdraw its members from union work. In time the union fractions, once the most boasted-of element of the SL's work, were dismantled as detailed by the IBT in their second bulletin Stop the Liquidation of the Trade Union Work in 1983.

=== Later splits ===
In 1982, a number of former members of the SL, united by their hostility to the SL leadership, founded the "External Tendency" (ET) of the SL. Initially based in the San Francisco Bay Area and Toronto, the ET was to define itself as a public faction of the SL and sought to be readmitted to the ranks of the parent organisation. These efforts were rebuffed by the SL who have since waged a polemical war with the ET and its successor group the International Bolshevik Tendency (IBT).

In 1996, Workers Vanguard editor Jan Norden and other founders of the League for the Fourth International were expelled, allegedly for maneuvering with a group from Brazil involved in bringing lawsuit against a trade union.

== Publications ==
- Spartacist on the anti-war movement: a compilation of leaflets New York : Spartacist Pub., 1971
- Toward a communist women's movement by Les Kagan [L.A. (i.e., Los Angeles) : Spartacist League, 1973
- Marxist theory and deformed workers states New York : Spartacist Pub., 1971
- Stalinism and Trotskyism in Vietnam by John Sharpe New York : Spartacist Pub., 1976
- Lenin & the vanguard party. by John Sharpe New York : Spartacist Pub., 1978
- The Great coal strike of 1978 New York : Spartacist Pub., 1978
- Solidarnosc: Polish company union for CIA and bankers New York : Spartacist Pub., 1981
- El Salvador: Military Victory to Leftist Insurgents! New York : Spartacist Pub., 1982
- You can't fight Reagan with Democrats: for mass strike action to bring down Reagan! : build a workers party! : vote Richard Bradley, vote Diana Coleman, Spartacist candidates for S.F. Supervisors San Francisco, CA: Spartacist Party Campaign Committee, 1982
- American Workers Revolution Needs Black Leadership New York : Spartacist Pub., 1982
- KAL 007: U.S. War Provocation New York : Spartacist Pub., 1983
- The Socialist Workers Party: An Obituary New York : Spartacist Pub., 1984
- Lutte Ouvrière and Spark: workerism and national narrowness. New York : Spartacist Pub., 1988
- Trotskyism: What It Isn't and What It Is! New York : Spartacist Pub., 1990

=== Marxist Bulletin ===
- In defense of a revolutionary perspective; a statement of basic position by the Revolutionary Tendency presented at the June 1962 plenary meeting of the SWP National Committee New York, Spartacist (Marxist bulletin, #1)
- The Nature of the Socialist Workers Party: revolutionary or centrist? : discussion material of the revolutionary tendency within the SWP New York, Spartacist (Marxist bulletin, #2)
- Conventions with Wohlforth. Minutes of the Spartacist-ACFI unity negotiating sessions. Pt. 2 Pt. 4 New York, Spartacist (Marxist bulletin, #3)
- Expulsion from the socialist workers party New York, Spartacist (Marxist bulletin, #4)
- What Strategy for Black Liberation? Trotskyism vs. Black Nationalism Revised ed. by Richard Fraser New York, Spartacist (Marxist bulletin, #5)
- The Leninist position on Youth-Party relations: Documents from the YSA & SWP, 1957–61 New York, Spartacist (Marxist bulletin, #7)
- Cuba and Marxist Theory New York, Spartacist (Marxist bulletin, #8)
- Cuba and Marxist Theory Revised ed. New York, Spartacist (Marxist bulletin, #8)
- Basic documents of the Spartacist League New York : Spartacist, (Marxist bulletin, #9)
- "From Maoism to Trotskyism": documents on the Communist Working Collective of Los Angeles New York : Spartacist, (Marxist bulletin, #10)

=== Black History and the Class Struggle ===
- Black History and the Class Struggle New York : Spartacist Pub., 1983 #1
- On the Civil Rights Movement New York : Spartacist Pub., 1985 #2
- Massacre of Philly MOVE New York : Spartacist Pub., 1986 #3
- Black Soldiers in the Jim Crow Military New York : Spartacist Pub., 1987 #4
- Finish the Civil War! New York : Spartacist Pub., 1988 #5
- Toussaint L'Ouverture and the Haitian Revolution New York : Spartacist Pub., 1989 #6
- Black Soldiers Fight for Freedom: "Glory" New York : Spartacist Pub., 1990 #7
- South Africa and Permanent Revolution New York : Spartacist Pub., 1991 #8
- Los Angeles Explodes—There Is No Justice In Capitalist America New York : Spartacist Pub., 1993 #9
- Malcolm X: The Man, the Myth, the Struggle New York : Spartacist Pub., 1993 #10
- Stop the Klan! For a Workers America! New York : Spartacist Pub., 1994 #11
- South Africa Powder Keg New York : Spartacist Pub., 1995 #12
- Fight for Black Freedom, Fight for a Socialist Future! New York : Spartacist Pub., 1996 #13
- Capitalist Rulers Wage War on Blacks, Immigrants New York : Spartacist Pub., 1997 #14
- Free Mumia Abu-Jamal! Abolish the Racist Death Penalty! New York : Spartacist Pub., 1998 #15
- South African Workers Battle ANC Neo-Apartheid Rule New York : Spartacist Pub., 2001 #16
- [No title] New York : Spartacist Pub., 2003 #17
- [No title] New York : Spartacist Pub., 2005 #18
- [No title] New York : Spartacist Pub., 2006 #19
- [No title] New York : Spartacist Pub., 2007#20

== See also ==
- American Left
- Socialist Alternative (United States)
- Socialist Workers Party (United States)
- Democratic Socialists of America
- History of left-wing politics in the United States
