= Socialist Equality Party (United States) =

Trotskyist political party in the United States

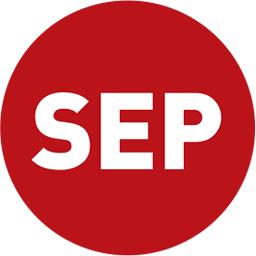
- Chairperson: David North
- Secretary: Joseph Kishore
- Founded: September 1964; 62 years ago
- Ideology: Communism; Revolutionary socialism; Trotskyism
- Political position: Far-left
- International affiliation: International Committee of the Fourth International
- Members in elected offices: 0

Website
- socialequality.com

The Socialist Equality Party (SEP) is an American Trotskyist political party. SEP first formed in 1964 as the American Committee for the Fourth International, created by expelled members of the Socialist Workers Party. SEP and its previous forms were associated with the International Committee of the Fourth International (ICFI), a Trotskyist political international.

SEP describes itself as a revolutionary socialist party, with a core belief that capitalism cannot be reformed, and only "a revolutionary movement that has as its aim the establishment of workers' power" can win socialism.

Notable members include David North and Jerry White.

== History ==
=== Background ===
In the 1950s, most Trotskyists in the United States were members of the Socialist Workers Party (SWP), which was part of the Fourth International's (FI) tendency International Committee of the Fourth International (ICFI).

In 1958, SWP adopted a policy of "regroupment": pursuit of former members of Stalinist communist parties, who had been disillusioned by the Secret Speech.

In 1961, Tim Wohlforth, James Robertson, and other SWP members who opposed regroupment created a tendency within the SWP, the Revolutionary Tendency (RT). RT saw the SWP as shifting toward the FI's other tendency, the International Secretariat of the Fourth International (ISFI), led by Michel Pablo. RT opposed "Pabloite" politics and Pablo's "entryism sui generis" plan, in which Trotskyists would maintain separate parties but personally enter into communist and social democratic parties. RT developed links with the Socialist Labour League in Britain, led by Gerry Healy. Lyndon LaRouche was briefly an RT member.

In 1962, the RT split: Robertson's majority kept the name. Wohlforth's minority renamed itself the Reorganized Minority Tendency (RMT).

In 1963, in preparation for merging the ICFI with the ISFI, Wohlforth was removed from the SWP's Political Committee.

=== Formation ===
In November 1963, the SWP expelled Robertson and the RT, who created the Spartacist League. Robertson's appeal was denied in April 1964.

In September 1964, the SWP expelled Wohlforth and the RMT, who created the American Committee for the Fourth International (ACFI) and launched the biweekly Bulletin of International Socialism. ACFI maintained connections with Gerry Healy and the (non-merged portions of the) ICFI, which they considered the legitimate Trotskyist movement. ACFI became the American section of the ICFI.

Wohlforth argued that the split was due to their demand for discussion of the decision by the Sri Lankan Trotskyist Lanka Sama Samaja Party to participate in the national government.

=== Subsequent history ===
Former SEP logo

In 1966, ACFI renamed itself to the Workers League (WL).

In 1973, WL entered serious organizational crisis. About 150 members and most of its founding leaders left. At Healey's insistence, Wohlforth was forced out of leadership.

In 1985, ICFI split in two. The Workers Revolutionary Party (WRP) in Britain argued that ICFI should support nationalist leaders like Saddam Hussein and Muammar Gadhafi. In 1985, the WRP expelled Gerry Healy, and WL sided with the ICFI majority over Healy's minority.

In 1995, parties affiliated with ICFI each renamed themselves as Socialist Equality Party. In 1998, the ICFI launched the World Socialist Web Site. ICFI runs the publishing house Mehring Books, formerly named Labor Publications.

In 2006, the Socialist Equality Party relaunched its student movement (the Students for Social Equality) as the International Students for Social Equality (ISSE). In 2012, the SEP renamed the ISSE as the International Youth and Students for Social Equality (IYSSE).

== Ideology ==
SEP is a Trotskyist party.

SEP supports a "revolutionary struggle against capitalism" and rejects socialist reformism, stating that "our aim is not the reform of capitalism, but its overthrow". In its list of transitional demands, the SEP includes: Universal employment, universal healthcare, ending foreclosures and evictions, workplace democracy, high inheritance taxes, nationalization of large corporations, and replacement of the volunteer-based US military with "popular militias controlled by the working class and with elected officers".

== Election results ==
The SEP has fielded electoral candidates in the United States for local, state, and federal offices. SEP candidates usually run as official SEP candidates on their own ballot line.

No SEP candidate has yet won an election.

=== Presidential elections ===
Year	Presidential candidate	Vice presidential candidate	Popular votes	%	Electoral votes	Result	Ballot access	Notes	Ref
2024	Joseph Kishore	Jerome White	4,651	0.00%	0	Lost	41 / 538	running as a Socialist Equality Party candidate	
2020	Joseph Kishore	Norissa Santa Cruz	345	0.00%	0	Lost	9 / 538	ran as Socialist Equality Party candidate	
2016	Jerome White	Niles Niemuth	382	0.00%	0	Lost	0 / 538	ran as write-in candidate	
2012	Jerome White	Phyllis Scherrer	1,279	0.00%	0	Lost	17 / 538	ran as Socialist Equality Party candidate	
2008	Jerome White	Bill Van Auken	18	0.00%	0	Lost	0 / 538	ran as write-in candidate	
2004	Bill Van Auken	Jim Lawrence	1,857	0.00%	0	Lost	45 / 538	ran as Socialist Equality Party candidate	
1996	Jerome White	Fred Mazelis	2,438	0.00%	0	Lost	43 / 538	ran as Socialist Equality Party candidate	
1992	Helen Halyard	Fred Mazelis	3,050	0.00%	0	Lost	33 / 538	ran as Workers League candidate	
1988	Edward Winn	Helen Halyard	18,693	0.02%	0	Lost	59 / 538	ran as Workers League candidate	
1984	Edward Winn	Helen Halyard	10,798	0.01%	0	Lost	71 / 538	ran as Workers League candidate	

=== Congressional elections ===
Year	Candidate	Chamber	State	District	Votes	%	Result	Notes	Ref
2006	Bill Van Auken	Senate	New York	Class 1	6,004	0.1%	Lost		
2006	Jerome White	House	Michigan	MI-12	1,862	0.8%	Lost		
2018	David Moore	Senate	California	Class 1	24,601	0.4%	Lost	Top two primary	
2018	Niles Niemuth	House	Michigan	MI-12	2,200	0.8%	Lost		
2018	Kevin Mitchell	House	California	CA-51	1,473	1.9%	Lost	Top two primary	

=== Statewide elections ===
Year	Candidate	Office	State	District	Votes	%	Result	Notes	Ref
2021	David Moore	Governor	California		31,160	0.4%	Lost	urged a "No" vote on the recall	
2003	John Burton	Governor	California		6,748	0.1%	Lost	urged a "No" vote on the recall	

=== State legislature elections ===
Year	Candidate	Office	State	District	Votes	%	Result	Notes	Ref
2016	Naomi Spencer	State House	West Virginia	16th	921	2.3%	Lost		
2010	D'Artagnan Collier	State House	Michigan	9th	138	0.7%	Lost		
2006	Joe Parnarauskis	State Senate	Illinois	52nd	1,894	3.4%	Lost		
2006	Eric DesMarais	State Senate	Maine	32nd	296	2.3%	Lost		

=== Local elections ===
Year	Candidate	Office	Area	District	Votes	%	Result	Notes	Ref
2013	D'Artagnan Collier	Mayor	Detroit		91	0.1%	Lost		
2009	D'Artagnan Collier	Mayor	Detroit		1,265	1.4%	Lost		

== See also ==
- American Left
- World Socialist Web Site
- International Committee of the Fourth International
- Left Opposition
- James P. Cannon
- History of the socialist movement in the United States
