= Socialist Youth League (United States) =

The Socialist Youth League was the youth group affiliated with the Workers Party, a splinter Trotskyist party led by Max Shachtman. The parent group changed its name to the Independent Socialist League in 1950. In February 1954, the Socialist Youth League merged with a faction of the Young People's Socialist League and changed its name to Young Socialist League. The YSL merged with a later incarnation of the YPSL in August 1958, around the same time that the ISL was merging into that group's parent body the Socialist Party – Social Democratic Federation.

== History ==
The SYL was established in 1946, just after World War II ended. During the war the Workers Party had concentrated mostly on colonizing basic industries and organizing wildcat strikes, but after the war ended this strategy foundered, as the expected post-war wave of labor radicalism failed to materialize. The groups press began to concentrate more on campus activism in the late 1940s and 1950s. By the early 1950s the SYL represented one of the few viable left-wing groups on Americas campuses. The other organizations that had briefly become popular on campus in the late 1940s – Young Progressives of America, American Veterans Committee, Labor Youth League – had all been discredited as either Communist Party USA or Communist Party USA influenced. The SYL filled this void and became the most visible Leftists group on campus.

In contrast to the low brow style of the CPUSA, the Shachtmanites attempted appeal to intellectuals and "elite culture". The SYL catered to a Bohemian milieu, the beginnings of the Beat movement. Writers like Norman Mailer, Allen Ginsberg and Lawrence Ferlinghetti would frequent SYL and YSL meetings. In one instance, while Shachtman was delivering a lecture on Dadaism a disgruntled Dadaist threw a bowl of potato salad at him, an event commemorated in Ginsberg's Howl.

The SYL made attempts to infiltrate and take over other groups in the 1940s and 1950s. It was most successful within the YPSL. The SYL recruited Michael Harrington and Bogdan Denitch within the YPSL, partially on the basis of their opposition to the Korean War, which the Socialist Party supported. In 1954, as noted above, they were able to merge the YPSL with the SYL to form the Young Socialist League. (The Socialist Party subsequently reformed the YPSL.) The new organization had a total of 83 members. Nevertheless, it was still one of the most visible leftist groups on campus in the mid-1950s. They also attempted infiltration of the Student League for Industrial Democracy where they organized a "Red Caucus" which took over the CCNY Evening Session chapter and attempted to steer the group in a more "disciplined" direction. After a two-year upheaval which strained the resources of the SLID they were eventually kicked out. In 1955 they succeeded in taking over the New York regional office of Students for Democratic Action, an affiliate of Americans for Democratic Action. They were only prevented from capturing the national organization when the ADA threatened to cut off the group's funding.

Meanwhile, the ISL was making overtures to merge with the Socialist Party, which itself had merged with the Social Democratic Federation to form the Socialist Party – Social Democratic Federation in January 1956. Proponents of the merger in both groups cited the youth groups as an important selling point. The revived YPSL had fewer than 100 members, while the YSL, by the late 1950s, had three times as many. A merger would give the party an appreciable youth section for the first time in a decade. While the merger was hotly debated at the SP-SDFs convention on May 30 – June 1, 1958 and then voted upon by the membership that summer, the YPSL and YSL merged in convention in late August. The ISL itself however was dissolved, its properties bequeathed to the SP-SDF and its members requested to join as individuals.

At the time of its dissolution the Young Socialist League had approximately 250 members in 15 chapters, including at Columbia, Oberlin, Antioch, Boston University and the University of Washington. A left group within the YSL, consisting of about a quarter of its membership led by Tim Wohlforth rejected the merger and went into the Socialist Workers Party affiliate, the Young Socialist Alliance, where they would eventually form the germ of the Revolutionary Tendency and, from that, the Spartacist League.

It published the magazine Anvil, in which Hal Draper was to publish an early version of his pamphlet The Two Souls of Socialism in 1960.

== Pamphlets ==
- History of the international marxist youth movement pt. 1. From its origin to 1919. New York, N.Y. : Provisional National Committee for a Socialist Youth League, 1946
- Next – a labor party! [New York] Pub. by Labor action for the Workers party and Socialist youth league, 1948
- Leon Trotsky on Zionism [New York] Socialist Youth League, 1948
- Declaration against war, adopted by Socialist Youth League, Libertarian Socialist League, Young Peoples Socialist League [Los Angeles? 1950 (with YPSL and the Libertarian Socialist League) 1950
- Cold war on the campus by Robert Martinson [New York] Socialist Youth League, 1950
- An open letter to Dean Acheson : "the marine corporal is right" by Max Shachtman [New York] Socialist Youth League, 1952
- Constitution of the Socialist Youth League, 1953 [New York] Socialist Youth League, 1953
- James Burnham and the managerial revolution by George Orwell [Berkeley, Calif.]: Berkeley Young Socialist League, 1955
- Draft statement on work in the Stalinist arena by Art Lowe [United States? : s.n., 1956
- What is the Young Socialist League? Chicago: Chicago YSL, 1957
- Which road for Socialist youth – reformism or revolutionary socialism?; writings of the left wing of the Young Socialist League. Berkeley, Calif., Young Socialist Forum, 1959
