= Workers Vanguard =

Marxist newspaper in the United States

- Type: Biweekly Newspaper
- Publisher: Spartacist League
- Political alignment: Communist
- Headquarters: New York
- City: New York
- Country: United States
- ISSN: 0276-0746
- OCLC number: 3880717
- Website: www.icl-fi.org/english/wv/

Workers Vanguard is a Marxist bi-weekly newspaper published by the Spartacist League, a Trotskyist political organization in the United States. It was affiliated also with the International Communist League, a confederation of similar groups.

== History ==
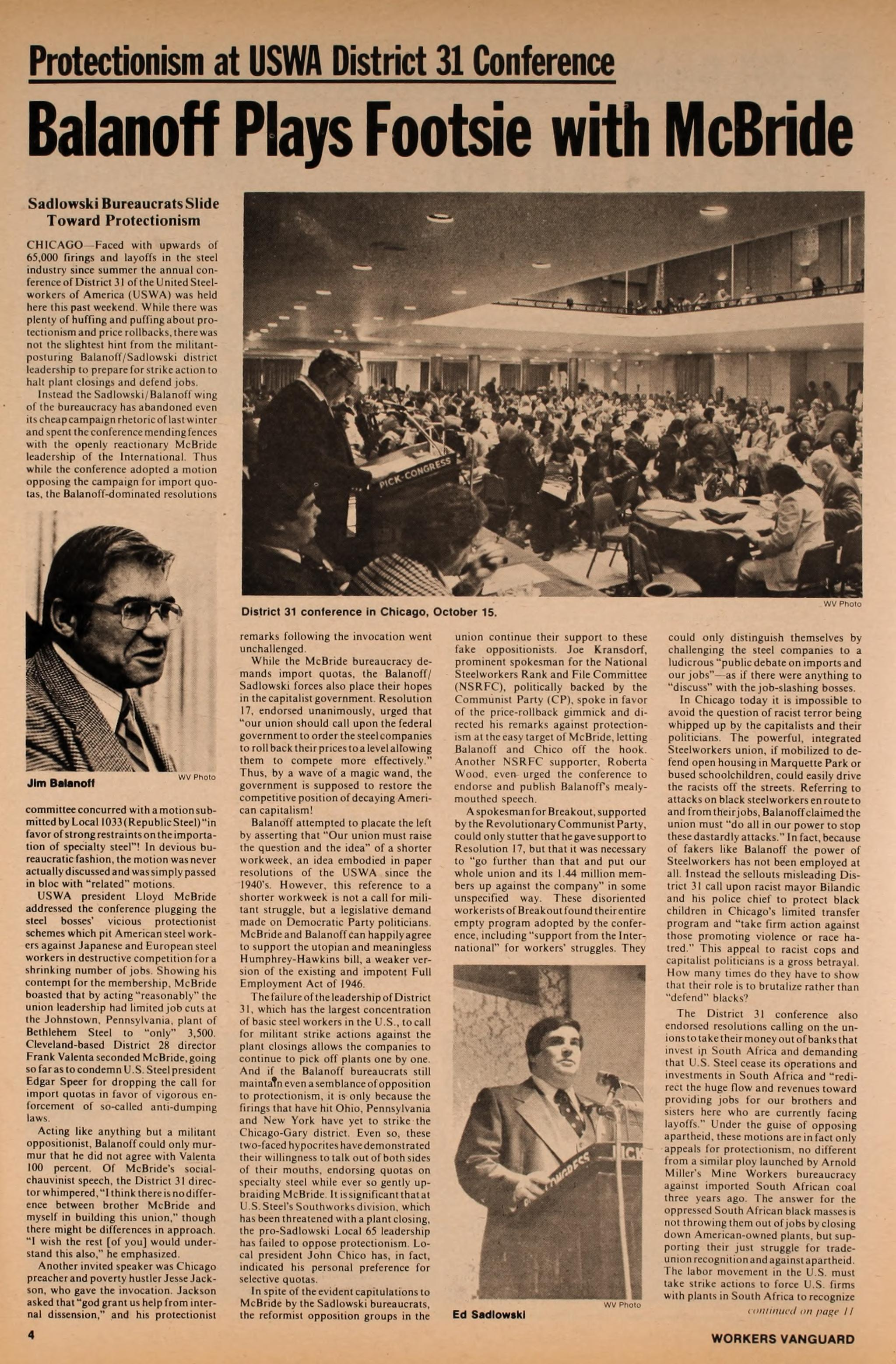
An article on the United Steelworkers published in WV, October 28, 1977

WV was first published in October 1971 as a monthly and absorbed Workers' Action, a short-lived bimonthly newspaper published by the nominally independent Committee for a Labor Party.

It was edited for over twenty years by Jan Norden, until he was expelled from the Spartacist League in 1996. Norden went on to found the League for the Fourth International.

It is available online beginning with the issues for 1999. (Prior years of publication, in bound volumes, can be ordered from the Spartacist Publishing Company).

The COVID pandemic and internal dissension apparently disrupted its publication from 2020 onwards.
