= International Bolshevik Tendency =

Political international

- Abbreviation: IBT
- Founded: 1982
- Split from: International Spartacist Tendency (now ICL)
- Ideology: Communism; Leninism; Trotskyism; Bolshevism
- Political position: Far-left

Website
- www.bolshevik.org

The International Bolshevik Tendency (IBT) is an international Trotskyist organisation.

== History ==
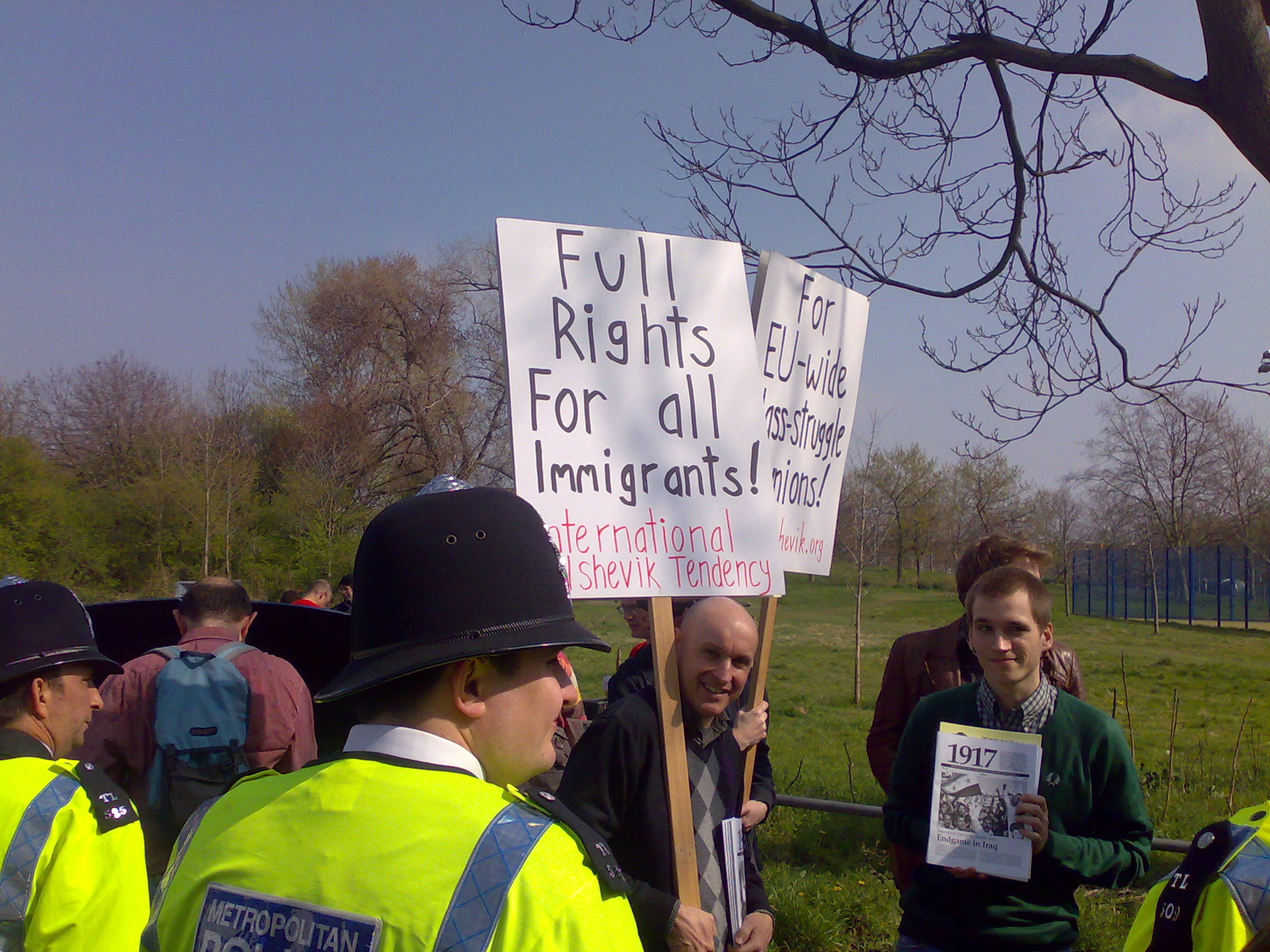
Members of the International Bolshevik Tendency in Victoria Park, East London in 2009.

The International Bolshevik Tendency was originally known as the External Tendency (ET) and was formed in 1982 by former members of the International Spartacist Tendency (iSt) (now known as the International Communist League (Fourth Internationalist)).

While identifying the International Spartacists Tendency, from the 1960s until the late 1970s, as the only grouping with a consistent revolutionary programme, members of the External Tendency alleged a 'process of political degeneration' in the late 70s and early 80s. A claim disputed by the International Spartacist Tendency (iSt) and subsequently, the International Communist League (ICL).

While the External Tendency had engaged in polemical exchanges with leaders of the iSt by 1985 the External Tendency characterised the Spartacist League's break from its revolutionary past as "qualitatively complete".

In 1991, the North American-based Bolshevik Tendency fused with the Permanent Revolution Group (PRG) of New Zealand at a joint conference in Oakland, California. This unified tendency then joined forces in August with members of the former Gruppe IV. Internationale based in West Berlin. These mergers resulted in the organisation renaming itself the International Bolshevik Tendency.

In October 2018 a number of members of the International Bolshevik Tendency left the organisation. Those leaving formed a separate organisations called the Bolshevik Tendency and Bolshevik Group (South Korea), identifying political alignment with the organisation before its fusion with the Permanent Revolution Group (PRG). The departing members cited disagreements regarding Russia and Imperialism, chiefly whether Russia could be considered Imperialist, with the departing members viewing Russia as non-Imperialist in character. It argued that this disagreement and others regarding the character of Islamist regimes in Egypt, Turkey and Iran signified a growing divergence in political analysis between itself and the International Bolshevik Tendency. The International Bolshevik Tendency stated that it does not consider these differences sufficient grounds for a separate organisation, and has called on former members to rejoin.

== Publications ==
The group began publishing its journal '1917' as the Bolshevik Tendency, in the winter of 1986. The journal name took inspiration from 'year one of the proletarian revolution'.

The British section of the International Bolshevik Tendency began publishing the 'Marxist Bulletin' in 1997, while operating as a faction within the Socialist Labour Party (UK). It published the last issue in May 2000.
