= Fair Play for Cuba Committee =

Early 1960s U.S./Canadian grassroots network supporting Cuban Revolution

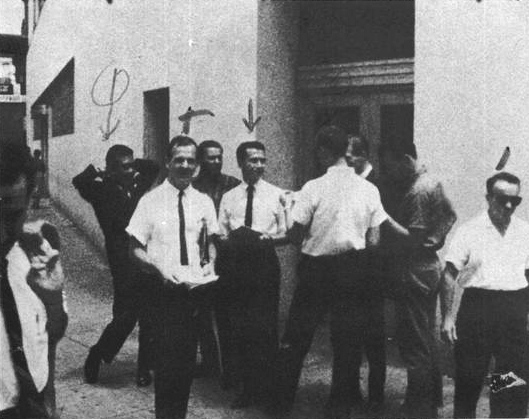
Lee Harvey Oswald and others handing out "Fair Play for Cuba" leaflets in New Orleans, August 16, 1963

The Fair Play for Cuba Committee (FPCC) was an activist group set up in New York City by Robert Taber in April 1960. The FPCC's purpose was to provide grassroots support for the Cuban Revolution against attacks by the United States government. It was active in both the US and Canada.

== History ==
The group was set up as a result of a reception in the Cuban Consulate General in New York City on 1 April 1960 for "friends of Cuba". The Trotskyist Socialist Workers Party was involved in the organisation.

The FPCC's purpose was to provide grassroots support for the Cuban Revolution against attacks by the United States government, once Fidel Castro began openly stating his commitment to Marxism and began the expropriation and nationalization of Cuban assets belonging to U.S. corporations. The FPCC opposed the Bay of Pigs invasion of 1961, the imposition of the United States embargo against Cuba, and was sympathetic to the Cuban view during the Cuban Missile Crisis of 1962. Its members were placed under surveillance by the FBI.

The group organised trips to Cuba and at one point had dozens of chapters across the USA. The committee was open to members of all races, and on the first anniversary of the Cuban Revolution a group of black civil rights activists, composed of Harold Cruse, Amiri Baraka, Julian Mayfield and John Henrik Clarke, travelled to Havana in a trip organised by the FPCC.

Subsidiary Fair Play for Cuba groups were set up throughout the United States and Canada.

In Canada the organisation had an office in Toronto, which obtained and distributed pro-Castro literature coming from Cuba itself. It also produced its own literature based upon testimonies from those who had travelled to Cuba and wanted to report their experiences on the island. The first Canadian chapter was founded by Vernel and Anne Olson, they held their first meeting in February 1961 at the First Unitarian Church in Toronto.

=== Lee Harvey Oswald ===
On May 26, 1963, Lee Harvey Oswald wrote to the New York City headquarters of FPCC, proposing to rent "a small office at my own expense for the purpose of forming a FPCC branch here in New Orleans". Three days later, the FPCC responded to Oswald's letter advising against opening a New Orleans office "at least not ... at the very beginning". In a follow-up letter, Oswald replied, "Against your advice, I have decided to take an office from the very beginning." On May 29, Oswald ordered the following items from a local printer: 500 application forms, 300 membership cards, and 1,000 leaflets with the heading, "Hands Off Cuba".

According to anti-Castro militant Carlos Bringuier, Oswald visited him on August 5 and 6 at a store he owned in New Orleans. Bringuier was the New Orleans delegate for the anti-Castro organization Directorio Revolucionario Estudantil (DRE). Bringuier would later tell the Warren Commission that he believed Oswald's visits were an attempt by Oswald to infiltrate his group. On August 9, Oswald turned up in downtown New Orleans handing out Fair Play for Cuba leaflets. Bringuier confronted Oswald, claiming he was tipped off about Oswald's leafleting by a friend. A scuffle ensued and Oswald, Bringuier, and two of Bringuier's friends were arrested for disturbing the peace. Prior to leaving the police station, Oswald requested to speak with an FBI agent. Oswald told the agent that he was a member of the New Orleans branch of the Fair Play for Cuba Committee which he claimed had 35 members and was led by A. J. Hidell. In fact, Oswald was the branch's only member and it had never been chartered by the national organization.

On 16 August Oswald returned to pamphleteering, this time with two others and a camera crew from New Orleans television station WDSU. The two others were an unidentified Cuban man and Charles Hall Steele Jr., who Oswald had found at an employment office and paid $2 for fifteen minutes of his time.

=== Surveillance and infiltration ===
In 1961 the committee was the target of the FBI's COINTELPRO, with FBI director J. Edgar Hoover describing the group as "one of the main outlets in this country for pro-Castro propaganda". In June 1961 Hoover approved "establishing counterintelligence programs in Cuban field in an attempt to disillusion current members of such pro-Castro groups as July 26 Movement and Fair Play for Cuba Committee". Among these suggestions was a plot to get leaders arrested by luring them with prostitutes. In December 1961 the FBI mailed anonymous leaflets to select members of the organisation "for [the] purpose of disrupting FPCC and causing split between FPCC and its Socialist Workers Party (SWP) supporters", a tactic they noted was "very effective". Due to the help of an informant the FBI also possessed photographs of the FPCC financial records and the mailing list of the organisation.

The FBI had informers in the FPCC, such as Victor Thomas Vicente in the New York chapter, and its members and activities underwent surveillance by the Detroit Police Department. The committee was the subject of investigation from both the Senate Subcommittee on Internal Security and the House Un-American Activities Committee. CIA interest in the FPCC was also documented by the Church Committee in 1975. It uncovered a memo dated to 16 September 1963 which stated that the CIA is "giving some thought to planting deceptive information which might embarrass the Committee in areas where it does have some support".

By December 1963, the Fair Play for Cuba Committee was defunct, largely in part to the fallout from the assassination of John F. Kennedy by FPCC member, Lee Harvey Oswald. FBI investigations concluded in 1964. The Committee was subsequently forgotten and on the rare occasions it was mentioned by historians, it was in reference to Oswald's membership.

== Notable members and sponsors ==
- Maya Angelou
- James Baldwin
- Jack Barnes
- Carleton Beals
- Simone de Beauvoir
- Alice Brock
- Truman Capote
- Robert Garland Colodny
- Cedric Cox
- Odessa Cox
- Farrell Dobbs
- W. E. B. Du Bois
- Lawrence Ferlinghetti
- Waldo Frank
- Richard Thomas Gibson (co-founder and head of the committee)
- Allen Ginsberg
- Richard Greeman
- Joseph Hansen
- Donald S. Harrington
- Calvin Hicks
- Saul Landau (student council leader)
- Vincent Lee (president of the Tampa chapter)
- Norman Mailer
- Alexander Meiklejohn
- C. Wright Mills
- Harvey O'Connor
- Lee Harvey Oswald (president of the New Orleans chapter)
- Linus Pauling
- Nanette Rainone
- Alan Sagner
- Jean-Paul Sartre
- Robert Scheer (student council leader)
- Pat Schulz
- Ed Shaw
- Marion Stokes
- I. F. Stone
- Paul Sweezy
- Robert Taber (co-founder)
- Kenneth Tynan
- Willard Uphaus
- Thomas Arthur Vallee (alleged conspirator)
- Victor Thomas Vicente (FBI informant)
- Robert F. Williams
- William Appleman Williams
- William Worthy

== Archives ==
- George E. Rennar Papers. 1933–1972. 37.43 cubic feet. At the Labor Archives of Washington, University of Washington Libraries Special Collections. Contains materials about the Fair Play for Cuba Committee.
