= Trotskyist Organization of the United States =

American political organization

The Trotskyist Organization of the United States was a small Trotskyist group active in the U.S. during the 1970s and 1980s. The group was founded by two dissident factions which had emerged at the Socialist Workers Party's 1971 convention.

The TOUS had its origins in the "Communist Faction" within the Socialist Workers Party. Their initial criticism of the SWP was that it focused too much on the feminist, peace and "nationalist" movements, rather than the proletariat. After being expelled after the convention some members joined with the Vanguard Newsletter group, while others entered the International Socialists. When the IS split in 1973 the former Communist Faction members joined the new Revolutionary Socialist League (US). Within the RSL they had called their faction the "Soviet Defensist Minority". They left the RSL in early 1974 and "retain[ed] a degenerated workers' state analysis".

Another group that arose in opposition to the SWP leadership was the Proletarian Orientation Tendency. This group also believed that the SWP had abandoned the concept of the working class as the motive force in history and had abandoned its roots within the proletariat. The majority of this group stayed with the SWP, while a smaller group, the "Leninist faction" continued to organize within the party and distribute factional literature. This group was expelled on October 26, 1972. On April 20, 1973 the Leninist faction held a fusion conference with Vanguard Newsletter group to form the Class Struggle League. In May 1975 the CSL dissolved into its constituent parts. The former Leninist faction, who made up the majority, entered the TOUS. The reason for the split within the CSL was over the idea of "rebuilding the Fourth International" which they saw could only be done with TOUS, a member of the Vargaite International League for the Reconstruction of the Fourth International.

The TOUS published a newspaper Truth and a magazine Fourth International.
