= Catherine Macleod =

Scottish feminist (1948–2021)

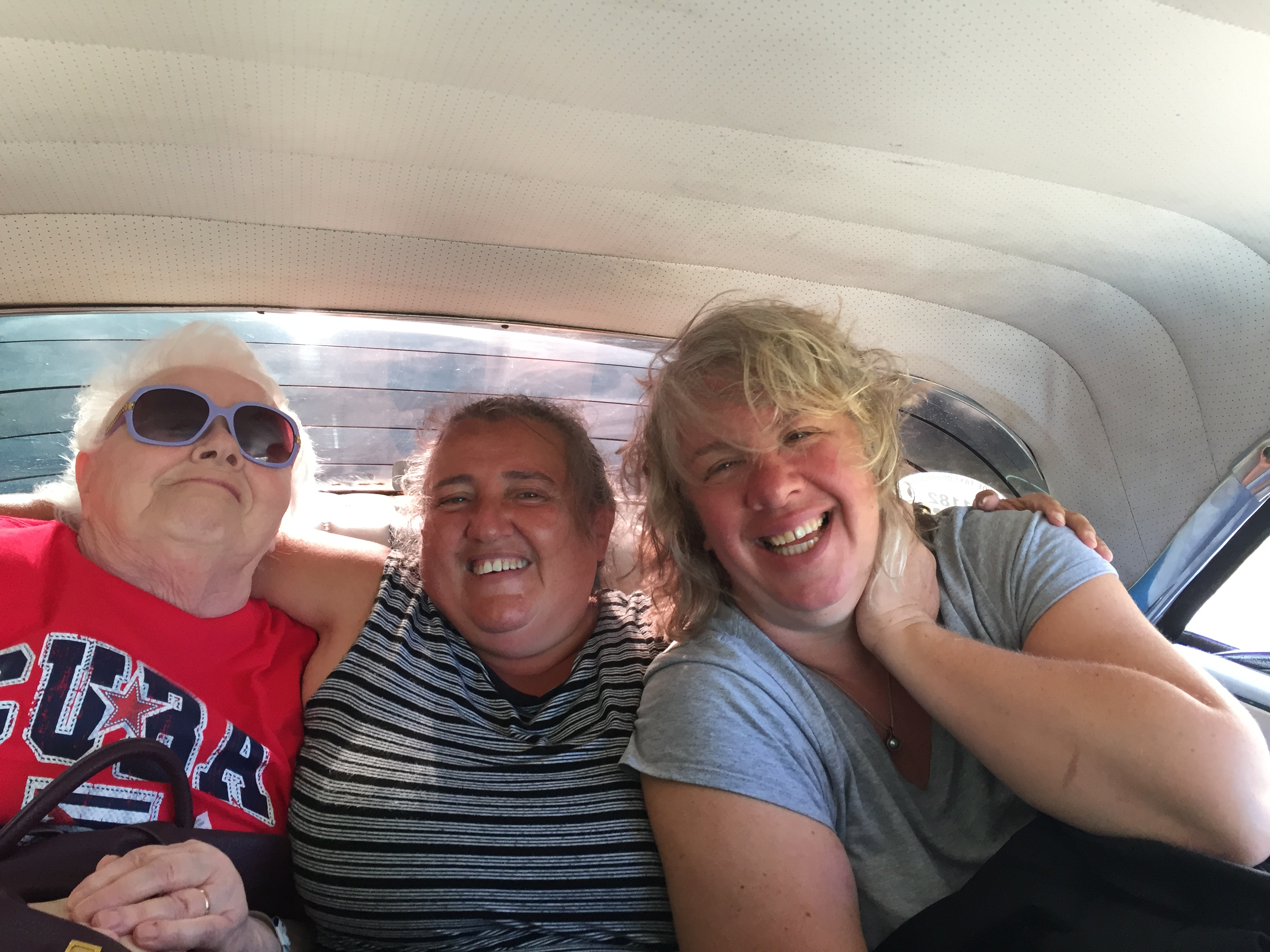
- Catherine Macleod (left) Cuba, 2020
- Born: 10 June 1948; Glasgow, Scotland
- Died: 8 March 2021 (aged 72); Goderich, Ontario, Canada
- Occupations: Feminist, trade unionist, poet, writer and playwright
- Known for: Writing about working class people's lives
- Awards: The Ontario Federation of Labour Cultural Award, 1997. Woman of Distinction Award for Grey and Bruce Counties, 2004.

Catherine Macleod (10 June 1948 – 8 March 2021) was a Scottish-born Canadian feminist, trade unionist, poet, writer and playwright.

== Biography ==
=== Early life ===
Born into an extremely poor family in Glasgow, Macleod emigrated to Canada in the 1950s. As a young woman, she left Kincardine for Toronto and the Yorkville hippy scene. There she discovered Leonard Cohen, Judy Collins, Bob Dylan and Joni Mitchell, and found her own voice as a feminist, socialist and artist.

=== Career ===
Macleod wrote Waking Up in the Men’s Room: A Memoir, published by Between the Lines Press in 1998. Toronto Star columnist Thomas Walkom called the book "a wry, articulate, unsparing and often poignant story." Macleod wrote three volumes of poetry, a chapbook titled Lessons Never Learned, The Telling Time published by the Ginger Press, and Re:late. Macleod's play Glow Boys was based on her family's experiences living beside Ontario's Bruce Nuclear Plant and was first performed in Kincardine and Port Elgin in 1985. Macleod co-directed (with singer Lorraine Segato) and produced Worth Every Minute, a 1987 NFB documentary about Pat Schulz, a working class socialist and child care activist. In 2007, Macleod edited The Kincardine Scottish Pipe Band: The First Century with author Basil McCarthy.

Macleod worked as a communications specialist in the Ontario labour movement for Bob White at the Canadian Auto Workers for a number of years, and as Director of Communications for Rosario Marchese, Ontario's Minister of Culture from 1990 to 1991. She also served as the acting Human Rights Director and later the Communications Director for the Ontario Federation of Labour. Macleod co-founded the Toronto's Mayworks Festival of Working People and the Arts and the Canadian Women's Educational Press, later called the Women's Press. Macleod strongly believed that everyone has the right to produce and enjoy art and culture. One of her favorite quotes was William Morris' "I do not want art for a few; any more than education for a few; or freedom for a few."

=== Personal life ===
In 1992, Catherine moved back to Kincardine and married her high school sweetheart Martin Quinn. Macleod and Quinn were active in community heritage and gardening projects, co-publishing Grass Scapes: Gardening with Ornamental Grasses in 2004.

=== Death ===
Macleod died in Goderich, Ontario on 8 March 2021, aged 72.

After her death, Canadian actor and director David Ferry wrote in the Globe and Mail: '...one thing I remember so strongly was how she helped make one of our modest productions bloom - literally. We were doing a Norm Foster play called Jupiter in July... and (I) mentioned how the director, Kyra Harper, wanted the stage to be full of plants because the protagonist was a gardener. Catherine simply said, "Well, of course she should have them." I mentioned the cost and the challenge of keeping plants alive and Catherine said something like "Pshaw." The next day, (Catherine's husband) Martin, a horticulturalist, turned up at the theatre and after looking at the stage announced: "Okay, I am going to bring in topsoil and cover the stage and plant a beautiful garden and I will come every day and care for it and if something fades I can easily replace it." On opening night, when the lights came up on the play, you could hear a gasp from the audience. They were looking at a garden in full bloom. Our production went from small time to big time and I could feel the audience members think: "This is OUR theatre." That was the energy and follow-through that was Catherine Macleod.'

== Works ==
- Pandora
- Ferns
- Glow Boys, 1985
- Worth Every Minute, 1987
- Lessons Never Learned, 1995
- Waking Up in the Men’s Room: A Memoir, 1998
- The Telling Time, 2002
- Grass Scapes: Gardening with Ornamental Grasses, 2003
- The Kincardine Scottish Pipe Band: The First Century, (co-editor) 2007
- Re:late, 2021
