= Sexophobia =

Fear of sexuality

Sexophobia is the fear of sexual organs or sexual activities and, in a larger sense, the fear of sexuality. As such, it can be applied to the attitude of a person based on their educational background, personal experience, and psyche, or to general stigmatization from collective entities like religious groups, institutions and/or states.

== Health ==
Sexophobia in the clinical talk has an effect on the way patients speak to their doctors, as it manifests itself in the communication strategies that are employed to speak about private health problems. In that sense, the use of neutral and veiled vocabulary by doctors can discourage patients to speak openly about their sexual issues.

Otherwise, historian and sociologist Cindy Patton has identified sexophobia as one of the main trends that characterized the development of the second phase of the HIV epidemics in Great Britain, along with homophobia and germophobia.
