= Robert Taber (author) =

American journalist and activist

Robert Bruce Taber (1919–1995) was an American activist, journalist, and scholar.

Taber was born in Chicago in 1919, and grew up in Detroit and Dundee, Illinois, and served in the U.S. Army during World War II. He worked as a journalist in New York City, for the Queens Evening News and then for a wire service, the Standard News Association, before joining CBS News in 1950.

Taber traveled to Cuba in the late 1950s as a CBS investigative journalist, accompanying Fidel Castro, Che Guevara, and their troops, who forced Cuban leader Fulgencio Batista to flee the country. His interview to Fidel Castro has wide popularity. He wrote M-26: Biography of a Revolution (first published by Lyle Stuart in 1961 about this experience.

Taber founded the Fair Play for Cuba Committee (FPFCC), characterized on the record of 1961 United States Senate hearings "as serving to glorify the Castro government and acting as its publicity agent".

Taber also covered the Bay of Pigs Invasion in 1961, joint to the government forces as a journalist, according to Cuban photographer Ernesto Fernández.

Taber's best known work is The War of the Flea: The Classic Study of Guerrilla Warfare, about "guerrilla insurgencies and their relationship to state power". The book was first published in 1965, and has since been reissued. In it, Taber examines guerilla patterns in Cuba, China, Algeria, Indochina, Ireland, Israel, Cyprus, the Philippines, Malaya, and Greece, among others.

== Publications ==
- M-26: The Biography of a Revolution. New York: Lyle Stuart (1961). ISBN 978-1258120504. OCLC 1150308536.
- The War of the Flea: The Classic Study of Guerrilla Warfare. New York: Lyle Stuart (1965). ISBN 978-1574885552. OCLC 419043.
