= Murry Weiss =

American socialist politician

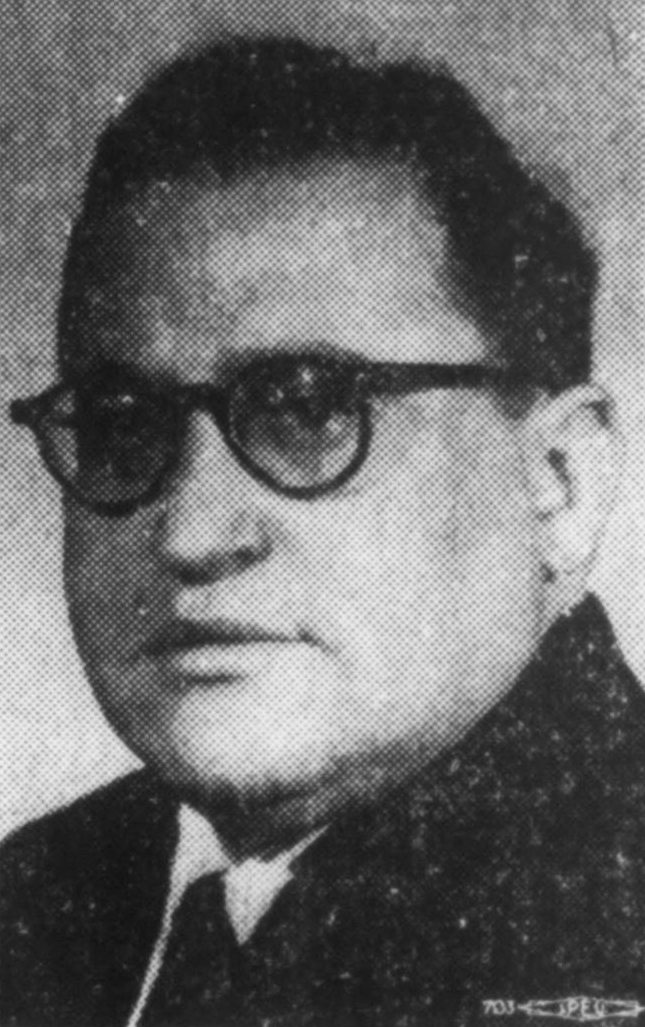
Weiss c. 1954

Murry Weiss (September 9, 1915 – December 26, 1981) was an American socialist activist.

== Biography ==
Weiss became active in politics when he was very young, joining the Young Pioneers of America and protesting against the convictions of Sacco and Vanzetti at the age of eleven. In his teens he became a Trotskyist and joined the Young People's Socialist League. Weiss and his wife Myra Tanner helped to organize Los Angeles protests against Gerald L.K Smith in 1945. In December 1954, he became the editor of The Militant, and he remained in the position until July 1956. In 1957, Weiss was responsible for convincing James Robertson and Tim Wohlforth to leave the Shachtmanist Young Socialist League for the Socialist Workers Party.

In the mid-1950s, Murry and Myra Weiss became the leaders of a group within the SWP, known as the Weissites, that opposed the leadership of Tom Kerry and Farrell Dobbs. The Weissites also argued against the "male chauvinism" of other SWP leaders. Weiss left the SWP in the 1960s. Following his departure, Weiss worked as a therapist in New York. Around this time, he and Myra separated and Murry moved in with Carol Munter, a fellow psychologist. In 1978, Weiss joined the Freedom Socialist Party, and later became the Party's national chairman.
