= Young Socialist Alliance =

Youth group for Trotskyist political party

- Abbreviation: YSA
- Founded: April 1960; 66 years ago
- Dissolved: 1992; 34 years ago
- Merged into: Socialist Workers Party
- Succeeded by: Young Socialists
- Ideology: Trotskyism
- Political position: Far-left
- Parent organization: Socialist Workers Party

The Young Socialist Alliance (YSA) was a Trotskyist youth group of the Socialist Workers Party (SWP) in the United States of America. It was founded in 1960, although it had roots going back several years earlier. It was dissolved in 1992. In 1994, the SWP created a youth organization called the Young Socialists (YS).

YSA membership peaked in 1971 at 1,434.

== History ==
=== Origins ===
The origins of the YSA were in an alliance of younger SWP members with others in the aftermath of the Hungarian Revolution of 1956. The principal other component was a group from the Young Socialist League, the youth group of the Independent Socialist League. The principal figures from the YSL were Tim Wohlforth, Shane Mage, and James Robertson, who joined young SWP members (hence the word "alliance") to found the "Young Socialist" newspaper. A founding YSA conference was held in April 1960 in Philadelphia, though local Young Socialist supporter groups had already existed in several cities for a few years.

The initial YSA central leadership comprised two rival groups: Wohlforth, Robertson, and Mage, who had come over from the YSL, and SWP-majority supporters represented by Nora Roberts, Bert Deck, and others. At the second YSA convention, in Chicago in 1961, the SWP central leadership arranged the removal of Wohlforth and Robertson from the YSA on age grounds and replaced the initial majority group with Barry Sheppard and Peter Camejo, with Sheppard as national chairman and Camejo as national secretary. At that time the YSA had about 150 members.

=== Activities ===
An early YSA activity was a national campaign in defense of three of its members who were students at Indiana University in Bloomington, Tom Morgan, Ralph Levitt, and Jim Bingham, who were indicted in 1963 under a little used anticommunist statute. The students were eventually acquitted.

At the YSA's fourth convention, held over the 1964-65 New Year weekend in Chicago, Jack Barnes succeeded Barry Sheppard as YSA national chairman. Barnes had joined the SWP in Minneapolis while a student at Carleton College in Minnesota. He in turn recruited a number of fellow students, including several who went on to become prominent in the Socialist Workers Party leadership of the next two decades.

The YSA had substantial influence in the anti-Vietnam War movement between 1965 and the early 1970s, including near complete control over the Student Mobilization Committee to End the War in Vietnam, a national campus organization with a peak membership of some 100,000.

In 1970, YSA members attempted to take control of women's liberation group Cell 16.

=== Decline ===
The organization went into rapid decline with the end of the Vietnam War in 1975. By 1980 its membership had fallen to 468, of whom only about 275 were not also SWP members. The YSA formally dissolved in 1992.

In 1994, the SWP created a new youth organization called the Young Socialists.

In 1999, the Young Socialists affiliated with the World Federation of Democratic Youth.
