= Jack Barnes (politician) =

American communist (born 1940)

National Secretary of the Socialist Workers Party
- Incumbent
- Assumed office 1972
- Preceded by: Farrell Dobbs

Personal details
- Born: Jack Whittier Barnes; 1940 (age 85–86)
- Domestic partner: Mary-Alice Waters
- Education: Carleton College

Jack Barnes (born 1940) is an American communist and the National Secretary of the Socialist Workers Party.

Barnes was elected the party's national secretary in 1972, replacing the retiring Farrell Dobbs. He joined the SWP in the early 1960s as a student at Carleton College in Minnesota and quickly became a leading member of the party's youth wing. From the 1990s to the present, Barnes has directed his party to support the governments of North Korea and Equatorial Guinea; has instructed the party to abstain from antiwar or anti-racist activism; and in January 2016 lent his support to the occupation of federal lands, in Oregon, by militia movement members. Barnes was a key advocate of the party's "turn to industry" in the 1970s, its exit from the Fourth International in the 1980s, and its orientation towards the Cuban Communist Party in the 1990s.

== Turn to industry ==
Barnes was one of the central organizers for the idea that the party should "turn to industry". In 1978 the party's National Committee approved a report by Barnes which argued that "we must subordinate everything else to immediately organizing to get a large majority of the membership of the SWP into industry and the industrial trade unions". SWP members took up union jobs in basic industries such as meatpacking, steel, mining and textile industries.

Work within these industries became a condition of membership in the SWP, as the party attempted to penetrate the portions of the working class that it felt would be most combative and open to communist ideas in the future: those unionized in basic industries. Party members organized within these unions form factions within the party. The SWP asserts that this course follows the continuity of the communist movement from Marx and Engels to Lenin's time, which stresses a party based in the working class.

Despite its dwindling membership, SWP members continue to take low-paying jobs, while following the SWP's guidance to avoid any agitation for union organizing, but to confine their activities to sales of SWP publications. Although leading the "turn to industry" in the 1970s, Barnes never worked in any wage-earning occupation. One former SWP member recalled that Barnes was unfamiliar with concepts or phrases such as "punching the time clock" or "overtime pay."

== Break with FI and permanent revolution ==
Barnes's article "Their Trotsky and Ours" also underpinned the party's decisions in the 1980s to abandon its support for Leon Trotsky's theory of permanent revolution, and its withdrawal from the world Trotskyist movement and the reunified Fourth International. Barnes repudiated the traditional Trotskyist understanding of permanent revolution in favor of Lenin's pre-World War I position of "democratic-dictatorship of the proletariat and peasantry", and a highly sympathetic view of the governments of Cuba, Nicaragua and Grenada.

The change prefaced the expulsion of more than a third of the party's members in 1983 and 1984, and was regarded by the opposition as a complete break with the party's traditions. As national secretary, Barnes played a key role in the expulsion of those who supported the USFI. In 1990, he wrote on behalf of the SWP to withdraw it from close relations with the Fourth International and to recognize the reality that it was now part of a "Pathfinder tendency" consisting of the SWP and several Communist Leagues in other countries.

== Orientation to the Cuban CP ==
Barnes has encouraged the SWP's growing interest in the Cuban Communist Party. In the 1960s, he was a leader of the Fair Play for Cuba movement. This interest continues, and he wrote a 2001 book titled Cuba and the Coming American Revolution. The SWP views the Cuban Revolution and the Cuban Communist Party more sympathetically than do some other currents of the Trotskyist tradition, stressing the alleged vanguard role of Cuba's foreign policy and what socialists can learn from Cuba about building a socialist society.

== Works ==
Jack Barnes is the author of political books and articles including:

- Capitalism's World Disorder
- Cuba and the Coming American Revolution
- Their Trotsky and Ours
- U.S. Imperialism Has Lost the Cold War
- Capitalism's Long Hot Winter Has Begun
- The Lesser Evil? - Debates on the Democratic Party and Independent Working-Class Politics.
- The Turn to Industry - Forging a Proletarian Party
- Tribunes of the People and the Trade Unions
- Are They Rich Because They are Smart?
- Malcolm X, Black Liberation, & the Road to Workers Power [Pathfinder, 2009]
