= Myra Tanner Weiss =

American politician (1917–1997)

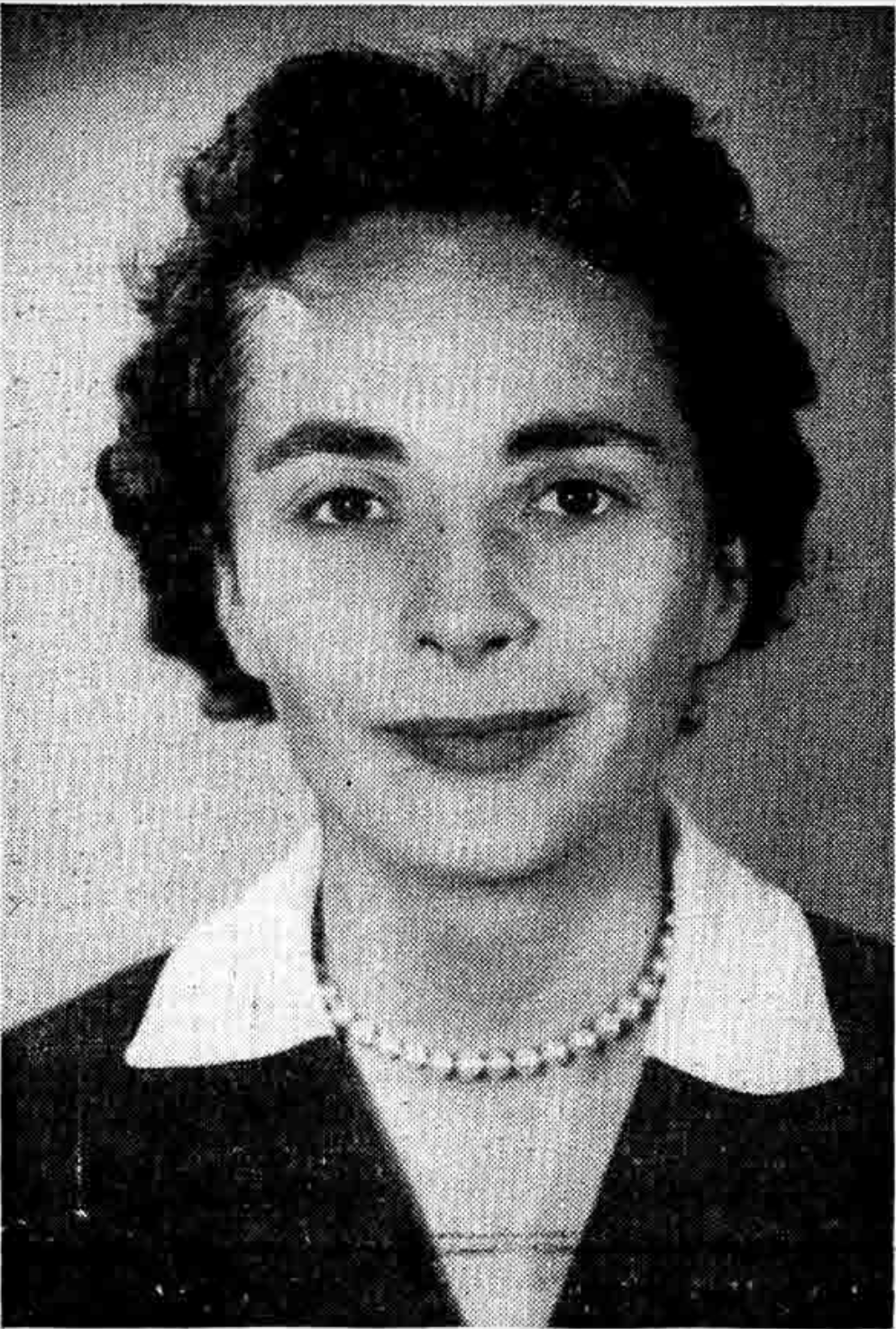
- Myra Tanner Weiss in 1956
- Born: May 17, 1917
- Died: September 13, 1997 (aged 80)
- Education: University of Utah
- Occupation: Politician
- Political party: Socialist Workers
- Spouse: Murry Weiss (m. 1942)

Myra Tanner Weiss (May 17, 1917 – September 13, 1997) was an American Communist following Trotskyism, and a three time U.S. vice presidential candidate of the Socialist Workers Party (SWP).

== Biography ==
Myra Tanner was born in Salt Lake City. Her grandfather had abandoned the Church of Jesus Christ of Latter-day Saints when it stopped supporting polygamy. She was recruited to the American Trotskyist movement in 1935, while at the University of Utah in Salt Lake City. In the 1930s, Weiss worked with agricultural workers in Southern California, eventually receiving an honorary membership in the Mexican Agricultural Workers Union because of her efforts.

In 1942, she married Murry Weiss, also a member of the SWP. They were living and working for the Party in Los Angeles, and Myra Tanner ran for the mayor of Los Angeles in 1945 and 1949.

Myra Tanner Weiss was the SWP's vice-presidential candidate in 1952, 1956 and 1960, with Farrell Dobbs running for President of the United States. In 1952, she and Dobbs received 10,312 votes in the presidential election. In 1956 they received 7,797 votes, though they increased their support in the 1960 election to 40,165 votes.

In 1954, Weiss was involved in an internal SWP dispute with Joseph Hansen, after Hansen had written an article in The Militant claiming that working-class women were wasting their money on makeup. This developed into a wider controversy within the Party over feminism and the political aspects of women's cosmetics. Weiss would later write that the chauvinism displayed in the incident contributed to her abandonment of the SWP.

Beginning in the 1950s, a split developed in the SWP between the supporters of Murry and Myra Weiss on one side and Farrell Dobbs and Tom Kerry on the other. The two groups argued over their approach to the Cochranites, the supporters of Bert Cochran who advocated for closer work within the Communist Party. Working with James P. Cannon, the Weisses and their supporters, known as the Weissites, attempted to preserve the independence of the SWP as a Trotskyist organization outside of the Communist Party. She resigned from the SWP in 1963, following disagreements with the party about the expulsions of James Robertson and other members of his Revolutionary Tendency group. Later in life, she and her husband Murry Weiss became political supporters of the Freedom Socialist Party.

Preceded by Grace Carlson	Socialist Workers Party nominee for Vice President; 1952, 1956, 1960	Succeeded by Ed Shaw
