= James Robertson (Trotskyist) =

American socialist activist

James Robertson (1928–2019) was the long-time and founding National Chairman of the Spartacist League (US), the original national section of the International Communist League. In his later years, Robertson was consultative member of the ICL's international executive committee.

== Biography ==
Born in 1928, Robertson joined the Communist Party in Richmond, California, in December 1946. He was active in its youth organization the American Youth for Democracy. While studying chemistry at the University of California at Berkeley, he left the CP to join Max Shachtman’s Workers Party shortly before it changed to the Independent Socialist League in May 1949. He was active in the WP/ISL’s youth organization, the Socialist Youth League, and its successor, the Young Socialist League (YSL).

Max Shachtman and his supporters then considered themselves Trotskyists, though they had broken with Trotsky’s Fourth International in 1940, abandoning the Trotskyist program of unconditional military defense of the USSR as World War II began. According to Robertson, the Workers Party gave up any perspective of reuniting with the Fourth International in 1948 and moved to the right under the pressure of the Cold War. Robertson fought what he considered this rightward course, co-authoring his first oppositional document in 1951. Along with Tim Wohlforth and Shane Mage, he was a leader of the Left Wing Caucus which developed in the YSL in early 1957 in opposition to Shachtman's plan to liquidate the ISL into what had become the Socialist Party-Social Democratic Federation.

Under the impact of the Hungarian Revolution of 1956, members of the Left Wing Caucus became convinced that the Stalinist bureaucracy was not a new ruling “bureaucratic collectivist” class, as Shachtman had insisted, but instead a brittle and unstable caste, as Trotsky had argued. Wohlforth, Mage and Robertson launched the Young Socialist in October 1957 and founded the associated Young Socialist Clubs; they joined the Trotskyist Socialist Workers Party (SWP). In response to the formation of a Tibetan Brigade at the University of California at Berkeley in 1959, Robertson wrote a leaflet enthusiastically supporting the Chinese state’s suppression of what he considered to be a CIA-backed uprising in Tibet, reflecting the Young Socialist Clubs’ adoption of unconditional military defense of China, which they regarded as a deformed workers state, qualitatively similar to the USSR after it underwent its bureaucratic degeneration.

Robertson was a leader of the SWP’s youth group, the Young Socialist Alliance, when it was founded in 1960. Robertson, Mage and Wohlforth opposed what they considered to be an uncritical embrace of Fidel Castro by the SWP leadership, which declared Cuba to be a workers state on a par with the early USSR. Facing a hostile SWP leadership, they founded the Revolutionary Tendency (RT) in 1961. The majority of the RT—which went on to found the Spartacist League—came to regard Cuba, like China, as a deformed workers state, qualitatively similar to the degenerated USSR. The RT considered what they perceived as the SWP’s abandonment of a revolutionary perspective reflected not just in their uncritical support to Castro, but also in the party’s uncritical enthusing for the existing leadership of the civil rights movement. Robertson co-authored several of the tendency’s documents calling for the party to fight for Trotskyism in the civil rights movement.

The SWP was then a member of the International Committee of the Fourth International (IC), which organized the orthodox Trotskyists internationally, including the British Socialist Labour League led by Gerry Healy. The IC opposed the revisionist Trotskyists led by Michel Pablo, who were organized in the International Secretariat (IS). When the SWP declared its intention to reunify with the IS, the RT opposed this. Under Robertson’s leadership, the majority of the RT came to the conclusion that the SWP leadership had become centrist, but Tim Wohlforth, at the behest of Gerry Healy, split the tendency, claiming the SWP leadership could be won back to authentic Trotskyism. Wohlforth went on to lead Healy’s American organization (until he was purged in 1974).

The RT majority was expelled by the SWP beginning in December 1963, just as the SWP’s reunification with the International Secretariat was being consummated. Robertson was the editor of the journal Spartacist, which began publication in early 1964. Spartacist supporters looked at first to the IC, which was now under the leadership of Gerry Healy. However, Robertson’s experiences at the IC's 1966 London conference led to a definitive break.

Robertson was elected founding national chairman of the Spartacist League/U.S. in 1966. When the international Spartacist tendency was formed in 1974, he was a member of its leading body and the author of the draft of its founding statement, "Declaration for the Organizing of an International Trotskyist Tendency." The iSt changed its name to the International Communist League (Fourth Internationalist) in 1989. Robertson's position as National Chairman of the Spartacist League/U.S. became consultative in 2004. He became a consultative member of the International Communist League’s executive committee in 2007. He died in April 2019 at the age of 90.
