= Olivier Besancenot =

French politician (born 1974)

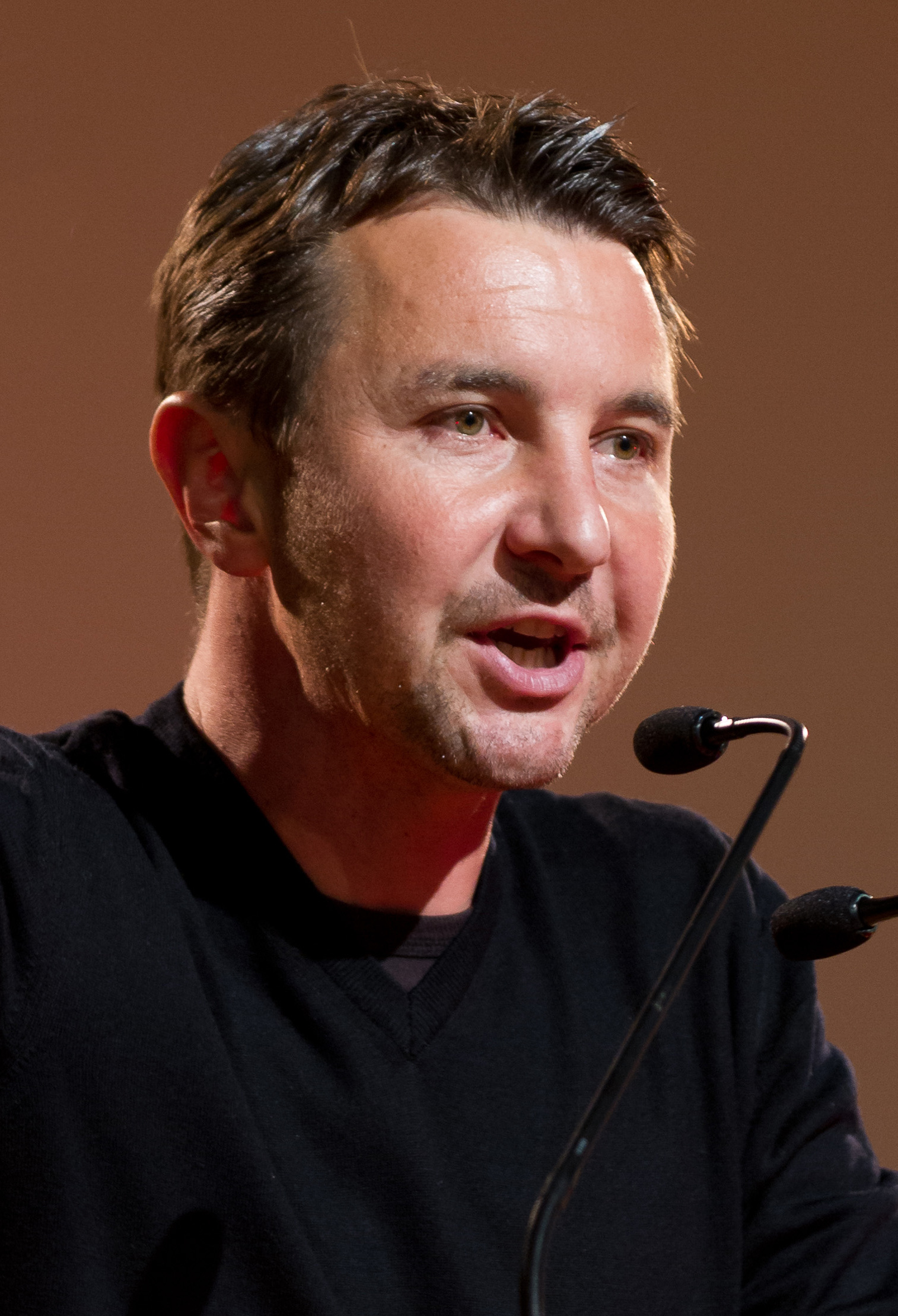
- Besancenot in 2012

Spokespeople of the New Anticapitalist Party
- In office 5 February 2009 – 4 April 2011
- Succeeded by: Myriam Martin; Christine Poupin

Personal details
- Born: 18 April 1974 (age 52) Levallois-Perret, France
- Party: Revolutionary Communist League (1991-2009); New Anticapitalist Party (since 2009)
- Education: Paris Nanterre University

Olivier Christophe Besancenot (French pronunciation: [ɔlivje kʁistɔf bəzɑ̃sno]; born 18 April 1974) is a French far-left political figure and trade unionist, and the founding main spokesperson of the New Anticapitalist Party (Nouveau parti anticapitaliste, NPA) from 2009 to 2011.

He was a candidate for the 2007 French presidential election, for the Ligue communiste révolutionnaire (LCR), the French section of the Fourth International. He gained 1.2 million votes, 4.25%, standing as a revolutionary socialist in the 2002 presidential elections. In the first round of the 2007 presidential election, Besancenot received 4.08% of the vote, just short of 1.5 million votes, placing him fifth and eliminating him from the race.

In May 2011, Besancenot announced that he would not be standing in the 2012 presidential election. He was succeeded as main spokesperson of the NPA by Myriam Martin, who later left the NPA to found Gauche Anticapitaliste (Anticapitalist Left), and Christine Poupin, joined by Philippe Poutou, who was the NPA presidential candidate in 2012.

== Biography ==
Olivier Besancenot was born on 18 April 1974 in Levallois-Perret in the Hauts-de-Seine region. His father was a teacher, and his mother a psychologist at a school.

He studied history at University of Paris X (Nanterre), gaining a degree in contemporary history. Since 1997, he has worked as a postal carrier in Neuilly-sur-Seine, a suburb of Paris, and is often dismissed by his right-wing opponents as "The Red Postman".

== Stance ==
Along with Alain Krivine and Roseline Vachetta, Besancenot was one of three spokespersons for the Ligue communiste révolutionnaire (LCR), a far-left political party which is the French section of the reunified Fourth International, an international Trotskyist group.

Besancenot, however, eschews the Trotskyist label:

I'm neither Trotskyist nor Guevarist or Luxemburgist, I'm a revolutionary. And revolution needs to be reinvented, for no revolutionary experiment has ever succeeded. Some of them ended up as bloody caricatures.

== Political career ==
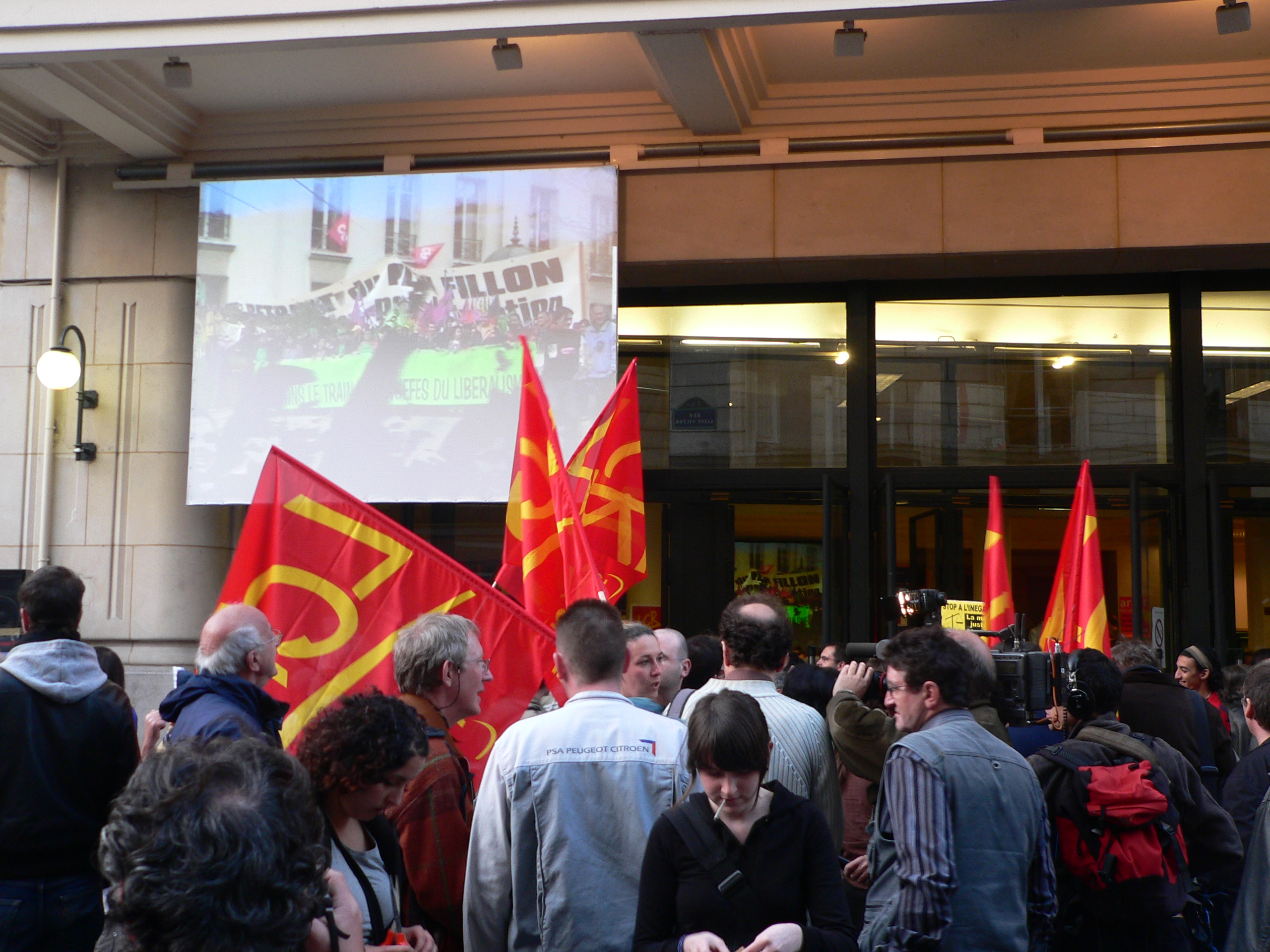
Besancenot supporters, brandishing the red flags of the Communist Revolutionary League, overflowing in front of La Mutualité in Paris, where Olivier Besancenot was holding a meeting, April 2007

Besancenot's engagement in left-wing politics started early. He joined the Revolutionary Communist Youth (Jeunesses communistes révolutionnaires, or JCR) in 1988 when he was fourteen.

When at university studying for his history licence, he formed a branch of the Confédération générale du travail trade union in the supermarket, Shopi, where he worked.

In 1991, he joined the LCR. Since 1997, he has been a member of the Sud-PTT trade union. He took a break from his job at the postal services in 1999 and 2000 to serve as a parliamentary attaché to Alain Krivine in the European Parliament.

In 2001 and 2002, he participated in the World Social Forum at Porto Alegre. He gained national prominence when he stood for the 2002 French presidential election. At twenty-eight, he was the youngest presidential candidate in the country's history. Standing on a revolutionary socialist platform, he gained 1.3 million votes, 4.25% of the total. Among voters under the age of 25, he gained 13.9 percent, beating Lionel Jospin and Jean-Marie Le Pen. In the run-up to the second round of voting, Besancenot urged voters to ensure that the far-right Le Pen did not gain power, by re-electing Jacques Chirac, despite his own misgivings about Chirac's political positions.

Besancenot ran again for the 2007 presidential election. His slogan throughout the campaign was "Nos vies valent plus que leurs profits" ("Our lives are worth more than their profits"); and he campaigned for redistribution of wealth, an increase in the minimum wage, prohibition of layoffs for profitable companies, and taxation of profits from capital speculation. He stood for political and electoral independence of the anti-capitalist left from the Socialist Party (Parti Socialiste, PS), and against its participation in a centre-left government. Besancenot was endorsed by British filmmaker Ken Loach, known for depictions of working-class struggles.

His campaign's closing rally, in Paris, was attended by 4,000, the largest meeting organised by the LCR or its predecessors since 1968. Besancenot gained 1,498,581 votes or 4.08%, around 300,000 votes more than 2002. He is the first in votes and in dominant position among candidates to the left of the Socialist Party's candidate, Ségolène Royal.

For the second round of the elections, Besancenot, after calling for participation, stated that, "On 6 May, we will be on the side of those who want to prevent Nicolas Sarkozy from attaining the presidency of the republic. It is not a matter of supporting Ségolène Royal, but voting against Nicolas Sarkozy.", fighting the Right in the street as well as at the ballot boxes. After the victory of Sarkozy in the second round, Besancenot and LCR call for "a united front of all the social and democratic forces [...] to organise a response faced to the extreme neoliberal and repressive programme of Sarkozy."

This led, in June 2008, to the launching of the New Anticapitalist Party (Nouveau parti anticapitaliste, NPA), intended to unify the parties and movements of the far left. The party aims to field its first electoral candidates at the 2009 EU parliamentary elections. Whilst plans were being put in place for the formation of this party, Besancenot was able to capitalise on the infighting occurring in the PS in the summer of 2008, as its members prepared to convene at La Rochelle for their annual party leadership contest. His popularity continued to increase, as he remonstrated the PS for focusing its attention on him, and not the incumbent president, Sarkozy. Besancenot told French TV, a medium in which he found himself in greater demand, that, "It's up to the population to get there [force a revolution] one way or another"; he also told a LCR conference that the left had been failing in its opposition.

One poll showed Besancenot's approval rating to be at 47%, far exceeding two of the main candidates for the PS leadership, Royal (35%) and François Hollande (31%). It was suggested in some media that, were Besancenot and the NPA to convert their popularity into votes (gaining up to a 7 or 8 per cent share), a splintering of the left-wing in France between Marxists and pro-marketeers, similar to that which occurred at the 2002 presidential elections, could happen.

== The "Besancenot affair" ==
In October 2008, seven people – including the leader of the Taser France company, the two leaders of a private detective agency, two police officers, a retired police officer, a customs officer, and one other person – were arrested and charged with several offences related to their having allegedly spied on Besancenot and his family, including the illicit divulging of information on his private life, the violation of professional secrecy, and "fraudulent access to automated data processing systems". They were accused of having spied on them between October 2007 and January 2008. The "Besancenot affair", as it was called, received significant media attention.

Libération commented, the day before the charges were confirmed: "A businessman who sells weapons to the Ministry of the Interior arrested, that's very disorderly. Particularly when he may be suspected of having had one of the most prominent politicians tailed by a private company directed by a former police officer."

== Published works ==
- Tout est à nous ! (2002), ISBN 2-207-25309-0, Denoël
- Révolution ! 100 mots pour changer le monde (2003), ISBN 2-290-33828-1, Flammarion
- Che Guevara: His Revolutionary Legacy (2009), ISBN 978-1-58367-177-1, Monthly Review Press, with Michael Löwy.
- Prenons Parti pour un socialisme du XXIe siècle (2009), Mille et une nuits, with Daniel Bensaïd.

== See also ==
- Ligue communiste révolutionnaire (LCR)
- The reunified Fourth International
- New Anticapitalist Party
- Sud-PTT
