= Intercontinental Press =

- Editors: Joseph Hansen (1963 - January 1979), Mary-Alice Waters (1979-1982), Steve Clark (1982-1984), Doug Jenness (1984-1986)
- Contributing editors: Pierre Frank, Livio Maitan, Ernest Mandel, George Novack
- Managing editors: Michael Baumann (March 1978 - April 1980), Steve Clark (April 1980 - September 1981), David Frankel (September 1981 - June 1984), Ernest Harsch (June 1984-1986)
- Translators: Gerry Foley, George Saunders
- Business managers: Reba Hansen (1963-?), Pat Galligan (), Harvey McArthur (), Nancy Rosenstock (- 198?), Sandi Sherman (?-May 1985), Patty Iiyama (May 1985 - 1986)
- Copy editor: David Martin (1981)
- Staff writers: Serving at various times were: Sue Hagen, Ernest Harsch, Fred Murphy, Will Reissner, Jon Britton, Dan Dickeson, Gerry Foley, Susan Wald, Fred Feldman, Steve Craine, Steve Wattenmaker
- Categories: Socialist news magazine
- Frequency: weekly; fortnightly from August 23, 1982
- Format: US-Letter (8½ × 11")
- Founder: Pierre Frank, Joseph Hansen
- Founded: 1963
- First issue: September 27, 1963; 62 years ago
- Final issue Number: August 11, 1986; Vol. 24, No. 16
- Country: United States, originally France
- Based in: New York
- Language: English
- Website: Digitized archive with search facility
- ISSN: 0162-5594
- OCLC: 4175202

Intercontinental Press (IP) was a weekly news magazine produced on behalf of the Fourth International (FI) between 1963 and 1986. The magazine was founded in Paris as World Outlook in 1963 under the editorial direction of Joseph Hansen, Pierre Frank and Reba Hansen as a "labor press service". A parallel edition in French was named Perspective mondiale.

World Outlook and Intercontinental Press produced a table of contents for the whole year in each year's last issue. Starting with volume 5 of 1967, World Outlook numbered the pages per year from the first to the last issue, with the year index referencing only the thru page number instead of issue and page within the issue.

The publication was interrupted after the October 29, 1965 issue (Vol. 3 No 31) because of an illness of editor Joseph Hansen, after which weekly publication resumed in New York with the February 4, 1966 issue (Vol 4 No 1).

In order to avoid costly litigation over the name with another magazine with the same title, the magazine was renamed Intercontinental Press with Vol 6 No 17 of May 6, 1968. This led to the common abbreviation as IP. The editors took the occasion to look back on the magazines evolution technical editorial changes since the first issues published in 1963 which were printed from type-writer produced stencils on a Rex Rotary mimeograph to offset printing, and reflected on the circulation and changing role of their publication:

As for circulation, this continues to surprise us in view of the cost of a subscription. (We rely wholly on subscriptions to keep going.) The reputation of World Outlook has been spread almost solely by word of mouth.

When we began, our primary intention was to supply various publications in a number of countries with material on a cooperative basis. We still do this, and some articles which we have supplied have reached huge audiences.
Individuals who learned about us began subscribing, however, and this tendency continued until eventually we bowed to the demand and even began servicing a few newsstands.

We have thus come to fill a unique niche in several ways. The late Isaac Deutscher, who was one of our steady readers and very encouraging to us, told us that he did not know of anything quite like it in the history of the revolutionary movement.

Between 1973 and 1978, a factional disagreement between the majority of the FI and the leadership of the Socialist Workers Party (US) started to affect IP: the Hansens were leaders of the SWP, which housed and managed the magazine, and IP tended towards the SWP's viewpoint more than the FI's. In 1973 the FI initiated an English-language edition of Inprecor, which merged with IP after the dissolution of the international factions in 1978. The merged magazine got the subtitle combined with Inprecor (which was dropped in 1985).

After the summer break in 1982, IP changed to a bi-weekly schedule, which was originally meant to be provisional, but which persisted to the end.

In 1983, new disagreements between the SWP and USFI developed. Again, IP favoured the SWP's viewpoint more than the United Secretariat's. This prompted the FI to reestablish the English-language edition of Inprecor, which is called 'International Viewpoint'. After the 1985 World Congress the SWP withdrew more and more from the Fourth International.

Intercontinental Press ceased publication in the summer 1986 with Volume 24, Number 16 of August 11, 1986, "merging resources with 'The Militant' and 'New International'". The subscriptions to the fortnightly IP were transferred to weekly The Militant for the number of weeks remaining, not the number of issues.
