= International Marxist Review =

Theoretical and analytical journal

International Marxist Review was the English-language theoretical and analytical journal of the reunified Fourth International. IMR was launched in 1982 alongside Quatrième Internationale, which was relaunched in the same year.

Fifteen issues of the journal were produced until 1995, when IMR was merged into International Viewpoint. At the same time, Quatrième Internationale (IMR's sister magazine in French), was merged into Critique Communiste, the theoretical journal of the Revolutionary Communist League. It operated under the ISSN numbers ISSN 0269-3739 and ISSN 1024-8234.

== Key themes and articles of each issue ==
- 1 The need for a revolutionary International; France under Mitterrand
- 2 Black revolt in South Africa; The land question in Latin America
- 3 New faces of feminism; Anti-apartheid struggles & class struggles
- 4 The legacy of Antonio Gramsci; Lessons of Grenada
- 5 The significance of Gorbachev; Revolutionary strategy in Europe
- 6 Latin America after Che Guevara; Morality and revolution in everyday life
- 7 50 years of the Fourth International; Reasons for FI remain valid
- 8 Europe: the big bluff of 1992; Dynamics of European integration
- 9 The national question in the history of the USSR and today
- 10 Central America; Environment; The national question in the Spanish state, and Ireland
- 11/12 Double issue: Documents of the 1991 World Congress of the Fourth International
- 13 After perestroika – What next? USSR; Poland; China (Swedish translation); Yugoslavia
- 14 Defending Marxism Today: Market ideology; Feminism; US left
- 15 Capitalism’s new economic order; Restructuring the labor process

An earlier International Marxist Review was that produced by Michel Pablo's Revolutionary Marxist Tendency of the Fourth International in 1971 and 1972.
