= Joseph Hansen (socialist) =

American Trotskyist (1910–1979)

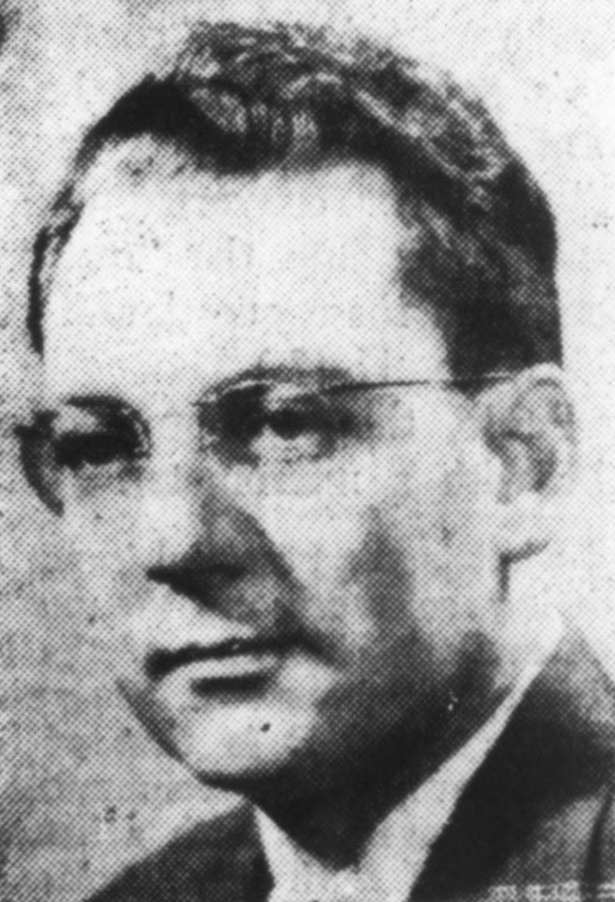
- Hansen c. 1954
- Born: Joseph Leroy Hansen; June 16, 1910; Richfield, Utah, U.S.
- Died: January 19, 1979 (aged 68); New York City, U.S.
- Other names: J. Allen, Jack Bustelo, Joe Hansen, Joseph Leroy Hansen, Herrick, Henderson, Pepe, Stern
- Years active: 1934–1979

Joseph Leroy Hansen (June 16, 1910 – January 19, 1979), was an American Trotskyist and leading figure in the Socialist Workers Party.

== Life ==
=== Background ===
Born in Richfield, Utah, Joseph Hansen was the oldest of 15 children in a poor working-class family. He was the only one of the children who could attend college. His father, Conrad Johan Zahl Hansen, was a tailor, originally from the island Kvitvær, Lurøy, Nordland in northern Norway. His parents had immigrated after converting to Mormonism.

=== Socialism ===
Hansen became politically radicalized during the Great Depression and he became a convinced socialist and joined the American Trotskyist group led by James P. Cannon.

With his wife, Reba, Hansen went to Mexico to meet the exiled Russian Communist leader, Leon Trotsky. Hansen served as Trotsky's secretary and guard from 1937 for the next three years. When the Stalinist agent Ramón Mercader struck Trotsky in the head with an ice axe, Hansen, together with Charles Cornell, prevented the assassin from fleeing.

Hansen returned to the United States and started working as a merchant seaman. At this time, he became editor of the SWP's newspaper, The Militant for a number of years. From 1940 to 1975, Joe Hansen served on the SWP's National Committee. In 1950, he ran on the SWP ticket for U.S. Senator from New York.

He helped arrange the reunification of the International Secretariat of the Fourth International and the International Committee of the Fourth International into the United Secretariat of the Fourth International in 1963. He became a leader of the USFI and an editor of the USFI's weekly English-language news service, initially called "World Outlook" and later changed to "Intercontinental Press/Inprecor".

Joseph Hansen strongly supported the Cuban Revolution of 1959 and wrote a book about it, Dynamics of the Cuban Revolution. A Marxist Appreciation. He visited Cuba together with Farrell Dobbs in the early 1960s. They were both active in launching of the Fair Play for Cuba Committee.

== Death ==
Joe Hansen died in New York City on January 19, 1979.

His wife and close collaborator, Reba Hansen, remained in the Socialist Workers Party until she died in 1990.

== Publications ==
- Father Coughlin: fascist demagogue New York : Pioneer Publishers, 1939
- Wall Street's war, not ours! [New York] : Pioneer Publishers for the Socialist Workers Party, 1940
- American workers need a labor party New York : Pioneer Publishers, 1944
- The Socialist Workers Party: what it is, what it stands for New York : Pioneer Publishers, 1948
- Too many babies? a Marxist answer to some frightening questions ... New York : Pioneer Publishers, 1960
- The truth about Cuba New York, Pioneer Publishers, 1960
- In defense of the Cuban revolution: an answer to the State Department and Theodore Draper. New York, Pioneer Publishers, 1961
- The theory of the Cuban Revolution [New York] : Pioneer Publishers for the Socialist Workers Party, 1962
- Trotskyism and the Cuban revolution: an answer to Hoy New York: Pioneer Publishers, 1962
- Khrushchev's downfall. A statement by the United Secretariat of the Fourth International; New Deepening of the Sino-Soviet Rift? New York : Pioneer Publishers, 1964
- Healy "reconstructs" the Fourth International documents and comments by participants in fiasco (preface) New York: Socialist Workers Party 1966
- The catastrophe in Indonesia; three articles on the fatal consequences of Communist party policy. (introduction) New York: Merit Publishers 1966
- Behind China's great cultural revolution by Shu-tse Peng (contributor) New York: Merit Publishers 1967
- The Nature of the Cuban revolution: record of a controversy, 1960-1963 New York: National Education Dept., Socialist Workers Party 1968
- Leon Trotsky: the man and his work. Reminiscences and appraisals, (contributor) New York: Merit Publishers 1969
- The population explosion: how socialists view it New York: Pathfinder Press, 1970 (revised edition of Too many babies)
- The Abern clique New York: National Education Dept., Socialist Workers Party 1972
- Nixon's Moscow and Peking Summits: their meaning for Vietnam (with Caroline Lund) New York: Pathfinder Press, 1972
- A Revolutionary strategy for the 70s; documents of the Socialist Workers Party. (contributor) New York: Pathfinder Press, 1972
- The workers and farmers government New York: National Education Dept., Socialist Workers Party 1974
- Marxism vs. ultraleftism: the record of Healy's break with Trotskyism by Ernest Germain (introduction) New York: National Education Dept., Socialist Workers Party 1974
- Healy's big lie: the slander campaign against Joseph Hansen, George Novack, and the Fourth International: statements and articles National Education Dept., Socialist Workers Party 1976
- What is American fascism?: writings on Father Coughlin, Mayor Frank Hague, and Senator Joseph McCarthy (with James Cannon) National Education Dept., Socialist Workers Party 1976
- Dynamics of the Cuban revolution: the Trotskyist view New York: Pathfinder Press, 1978
- The Leninist strategy of party building: the debate on guerrilla warfare in Latin America New York: Pathfinder Press, 1979
