= Livio Maitan =

Italian Trotskyist (1923–2004)

Livio Maitan (April 1, 1923 – September 16, 2004) was an Italian Trotskyist, a leader of Associazione Bandiera Rossa and of the Fourth International. He was born in Venice and died in Rome.

== Life and career ==
He graduated in Classics (lettere classiche) from the University of Padua, and became politically active during the years of the Nazi occupation of Italy, and was subsequently a leading member of the Italian Socialist Youth. In 1947, he joined the Fourth International, of which he was a leading member from 1951 throughout his life. In 1948, he was a member of the leadership of the Fronte Democrazia Popolare.

Maitan was one of a small group of colleagues who led the Fourth International during the difficult years of the 1950s and early 1960s. First elected in 1951, he remained a member of the International leadership, reelected at each congress, until his death. Critics of the Fourth International talked about the “Mandel-Frank-Maitan” leadership of the FI, following the departure of Michel Pablo.

His generation was the cadres who continued as revolutionary Marxists through the post-World War II years, and who were gradually able to connect their vision with the young activists in the mid- and late 1960s. Maitan was actively involved in the large-scale student movement in Italy between 1969 and 1976, and widely seen as the main inspiration for leaders of the Italian revolutionary left, whether inside the Fourth International or outside.

In the 1970s, he also lectured on the economy of underdevelopment in the School of Sociology at the University of Rome. He translated and introduced almost all the Italian editions of Leon Trotsky’s writings.

In 1989, the Italian Fourth Internationalists organised around Lega Comunista Rivoluzionaria, which joined Democrazia Proletaria, and with DP participated in 1991 in the foundation of the Communist Refoundation Party, PRC. He was elected to the leadership of the PRC at each successive Congress from 1991 until 2002.

Until just before his death, he maintained his participation in all the leadership bodies of the FI. A football fanatic, he continued to play weekly into his seventies.

== Works ==
There is a long list of his publications in Italian. Translated works include his 1976 book on the Chinese Cultural Revolution and a long text on the history of the Italian Communist Party, published by the International Institute for Research and Education in English and French. In 2002, he wrote Per una storia della Quarta Internazionale (Rome, ed. Alegre), a history of the Fourth International.

He also wrote for the journals of the Italian Fourth Internationalists (Bandiera Rossa and subsequently ERRE), of Rifondazione (Liberazione) and of the Fourth International, Inprecor and International Viewpoint.

In a late publication (La strada percorsa - "The road taken"), Maitan argued strongly against the view that the defeats of socialism in the 20th century were "inevitable", and equally strongly for the view that the possibility of Socialism remains open. In 2002, he wrote "Per una storia della Quarta Internazionale", ed. Alegre, Roma.

In 2007 the Livio Maitan Study Centre was set up in Rome with the support of a large number of academics, including Gilbert Achcar, Daniel Bensaïd, Tariq Ali, Alex Callinicos, Claudio Katz, Michael Löwy and Slavoj Žižek.

== List of works ==
- Gramsci's current affairs and communist politics, Milan, Schwarz, 1955; Foligno, Pietro Tresso Study Center, 1995.
- Communist theory and politics after the war, Milan, Schwarz, 1959.
- Trotsky, today, Turin, Einaudi, 1959.
- Algeria and socialism, edited by, Rome, Samonà and Savelli-Libreria Internazionale Terzo Mondo, 1963.
- From the Moscow trials to the fall of Khrushchev. Analysis of Leo Trotsky's Stalinism and the international Trotskyist movement, edited by, Rome, Edizioni Bandiera Rossa, 1965.
- The labor movement in a critical phase. Programming, center-left, transitory objectives, party unification and conception, coexistence and internationalism, Rome, Samonà and Savelli, 1966.
- The construction of the revolutionary party, edited by and with Sirio Di Giuliomaria, Rome, New international editions, 1967.
- The revolutionary explosion in France. With essential documentation and chronology, Rome, Samonà and Savelli, 1968.
- PCI 1945-1969: Stalinism and opportunism, Rome, Samonà and Savelli, 1969.
- Party, army and masses in the Chinese crisis. A Marxist interpretation of the cultural revolution, Rome, Samonà and Savelli, 1969.
- Verification of Leninism in Italy (1968-1972), in The Leninist Party, Rome, The New Left, 1972.
- Dynamics of social classes in Italy, with a commentary by Paolo Sylos Labini, Rome, Savelli, 1975.
- The great depression (1929-32) and the recession of the 1970s, Rome, Savelli, 1976.
- The crisis of Marxism, late 1970s edition, Milan, New international editions, 1980.
- Destiny of Trotsky, Milan, Rizzoli, 1981.
- The revolutionary Marxism by Antonio Gramsci, Milan, New international editions, 1987; revised edition with a short anthology of writings by Gramsci and on Gramsci, 1997.
- At the end of a long march. From PCI to PDS, Rome, Erre emme, 1990. ISBN 88-85378-20-X .
- Anticapitalism and communism. Potential and antinomies of a refoundation, Naples, Cuen, 1992. ISBN 88-7146-192-4 .
- The Chinese dilemma. Critical analysis of post-revolutionary China 1949-1993, Rome, Datanews, 1994. ISBN 88-7981-011-1 .
- From the USSR to Russia, 1917-1995. The inverted transition, Rome, Datanews, 1996. ISBN 88-7981-044-8 .
- Storms in the world economy. From the postwar period to the Asian crises, Rome, Datanews, 1998. ISBN 88-7981-107-X .
- Sixty years of debates and struggles of the Fourth International. History through documents, Milan, New international editions, 1998.
- The China of Tiananmen, edited by, Bolsena, Massari, 1999. ISBN 88-457-0139-5 .
- The road traveled. From the Resistance to the new movements: critical reading and alternative choices, Bolsena, Massari, 2002. ISBN 88-457-0180-8 .
- Per une storia della IV internazionale. La testimonia di un communista controcorrente, Rome, Alegre, 2006. ISBN 88-89772-08-5 .
- Party, Army and Masses in China, London, Verso, 2016 (first published 1976). ISBN 978-1-78663-149-7
- Memoirs of a critical communist, Towards a history of the IV international, London, Merlin, 2019. ISBN 978-0-85036-756-0 .

=== Translations, prefaces and other editions ===
- Preface and translation by Leone Trotsky, The betrayed revolution, Milan, Schwarz, 1956.
- Preface, translation and notes by Leone Trotsky, The Third International after Lenin, Milan, Schwarz, 1957.
- Edited by and with Tristan Sauvage ( Arturo Schwarz ), with translation and notes by Leone Trotsky, Literature, art, freedom, Milan, Schwarz, 1958.
- Translation by André Breton, History of Surrealism, 1919-1945. 72 plates out of text, 2 volumes, Milan, Schwarz, 1961.
- Edited by Lev Trotsky, Scritti 1929-1936, Turin, Einaudi, 1962; Milan, A. Mondadori, 1968.
- Translation by Lev Trotsky, History of the Russian Revolution, Milan, Sugar, 1964; Milan, A. Mondadori, 1969.
- Translation by Ernest Mandel, Marxist Economics Treaty, Rome, Samonà and Savelli, 1965.
- Translation by Jacek Kuroń, Opposition Marxism, Rome, Samonà and Savelli, 1967.
- Preface and translation by Lev Trotsky, The permanent revolution, Turin, Einaudi, 1967.
- Translation by Karl Marx, Misery of Philosophy. Response to Proudhon's The Philosophy of Misery, Rome, Samonà and Savelli, 1968.
- Translation by Jacek Kuroń and Karol Modzelewski, Polish Marxism in the Opposition, Rome, Samonà and Savelli, 1969.
- Introduction to Karl Marx, VI Lenin, Rosa Luxemburg, LD Trotsky, Marxism and the trade union, Rome, Samonà and Savelli, 1970.
- Introduction and translation by Lev Trotsky, The problems of the Chinese revolution and other writings on international issues. 1924-1940, Turin, Einaudi, 1970.
- Translation of with Paolo Flores d'Arcais by Karl Marx, Writings on the Paris Commune, Rome, The new left-Samonà and Savelli, 1971.
- Preface to Lev D. Trotsky, The betrayed revolution, Rome, Samonà and Savelli, 1972.
- Translation by LD Trotsky, The transition program, Rome, Red Flag, 1972.
- Translation and introduction by Lev Trotsky, War and revolution, Milan, A. Mondadori, 1973.
- Translation (with Maria Novella Pierini ) by Ernest Mandel, Neocapitalism and the dollar crisis, Rome-Bari, Laterza, 1973.
- Translation by Ernest Mandel, Introduction to Marxism. From social inequality to a classless society, Rome, Savelli, 1975.
- Preface to Lev Trotsky, The Young Lenin. Lenin's youth told by a comrade in fight, Milan, A. Mondadori, 1976.
- Translation and introduction by Lev Trotsky, My life, Milan, A. Mondadori, 1976.
- Edited by Lev Trotsky, Problems of the revolution in Europe. The first years of the Communist International, Milan, A. Mondadori, 1979.
- Translation by LD Trotsky, Selected writings, 1905-1940, Rome, Savelli, 1980.
- Preface to Aldo Bronzo, The Communists in China. From the origins to the seizure of power, 2 volumes, Milan, New international editions, 1983.
- Introduction to Giuseppina (Pina) Verdoja, A Trotskyist after the war, Foligno, Pietro Tresso Study Center, 1992.
- Introduction to Giuseppe Paolo Samonà, The political formation of a revolutionary intellectual. Autobiographical notes. (1950-1968), Florence, BI-Elle, 1997.
- Introduction to Daniel Bensaïd, François Vercammen, Antonio Moscato, Lenin, the party and the revolution, Milan, New international editions, 1997.
- Preface to Michel Husson and Daniel Bensaïd, The new world disorder. Imperialism today and the movement that challenges it, Milan, New international editions, 2001.
