= Elections in Rhône-Alpes =

This page gathers the results of elections in Rhône-Alpes.

== Regional elections ==
=== Last regional election ===
In the last regional election, which took place on March 21 and March 28, 2004, Jean-Jack Queyranne (PS) was elected president, defeating the incumbent Anne-Marie Comparini (UDF). The cantonal electoral calendar held particular significance, in that at this time both regional and departmental elections were held simultaneously.

Candidate	Party	Votes (Round One)	% (Round One)	Votes (Round Two)	% (Round Two)
Jean-Jack Queyranne	PS-PRG-PCF	688,718	32.19%	1,083,755	46.52%
Anne-Marie Comparini	UDF-UMP-CAP21-FRS	667,856	31.22%	889,815	38.20%
Bruno Gollnisch	FN	389,565	18.21%	355,864	15.28%
Gérard Leras	Verts	215,783	10.09%	-	-
Patrick Bertrand	GRAD-Union of Radical Republicans (U2R)	46,611	2.18%	-	-
Norbert Chetail	MNR	35,310	1.65%	-	-
Roseline Vachetta	LO/LCR	95,524	4.47%	-	-
Total		2,139,367	100.00%	2,329,434	100.00%
