= Alain Krivine =

French politician (1941–2022)

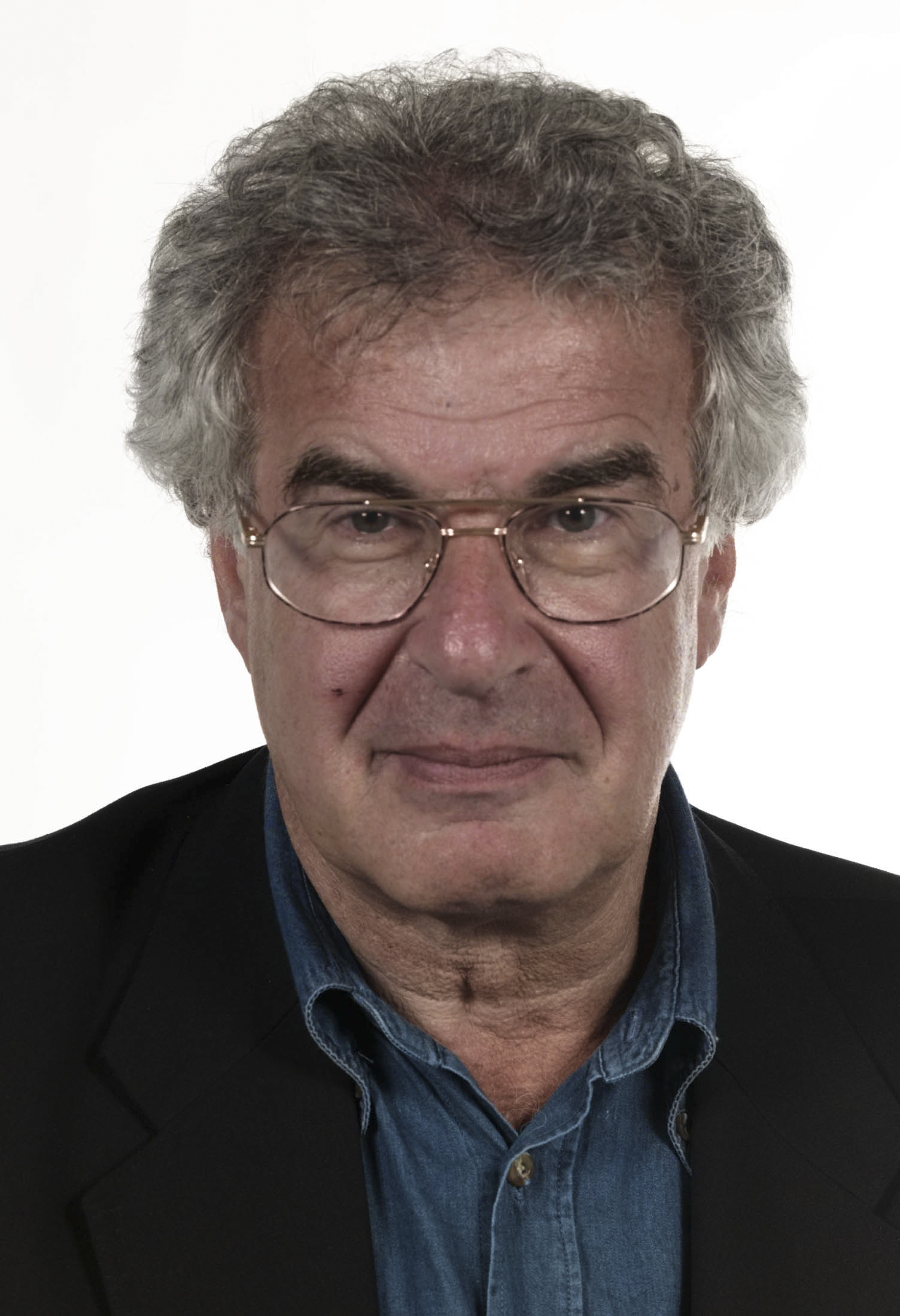
- Krivine in 1999

Member of the European Parliament
- In office 20 July 1999 – 19 July 2004
- Parliamentary group: The Left in the European Parliament – GUE/NGL

Personal details
- Born: 10 July 1941 Paris, France
- Died: 12 March 2022 (aged 80) Paris, France
- Party: Revolutionary Communist League (1974–2009); New Anticapitalist Party (2009–2022)
- Education: Lycée Condorcet
- Alma mater: Faculté des lettres de Paris

Alain Krivine (French: [a.lɛ̃ kʁi.vin]; 10 July 1941 – 12 March 2022) was a French Trotskyist leader and one of the leaders of the May 1968 revolt in Paris. He was a member of the Revolutionary Communist League (LCR), which was the French section of the reunified Fourth International.

== Early life ==
Krivine was born in July 1941 in Paris, France, the child of Pierre Léon Georges Krivine, a stomatologist, and Esther Lautman, the sister of French Resistance fighter Albert Lautman. The Krivine family originally came from Ukraine, having fled to France during the antisemitic pogroms of the Russian Empire in the 19th century.

== Career ==
Krivine was one of the leaders of the May 1968 revolt in Paris, and was the last of the generation radicalised in the 1960s to serve on the political bureau of the LCR. He was the candidate of the LC at the French presidential election of 1969, getting 1.05% of the votes. He released his first book that same year "La Farce électorale" (The Electoral Farce). In 1974, he participated in the founding of the Front Communiste Révolutionnaire which became the LCR in that same year. He was the FCR's presidential candidate in 1974 elections, coming in ninth place with around 0.37% of votes. He released his second book in 1974 titled "Questions sur la révolution" (Questions on the révolution). He tried to run again for president in 1981, but failed to secure the required 500 endorsements from elected officials.

He was a member of the LCR's political bureau until March 2006, when he resigned from that committee. He was a member of the European Parliament from 1999 to 2004.

He wrote the preface for André Fichaut's 2003 autobiography "Sur le pont. Souvenirs d'un ouvrier trotskiste breton" (On the bridge. Memories of a Breton Trotskyist worker). Later in 2006, he wrote an autobiography titled "Ça te passera avec l'age." (That'll go away with age)

== Death ==
Krivine died on 12 March 2022 in Paris, at the age of 80. His funeral was held in the Père Lachaise Cemetery on 21 March 2022. Over 2000 people attended it including many left-wing and far-left figures, including: Jean-Luc Mélenchon former presidential candidate of La France Insoumise (LFI), LFI deputies Adrien Quatennens and Alexis Corbière, former LCR presidential candidate Olivier Besancenot, former NPA presidential candidate Philippe Poutou, journalist Edwy Plenel and the former militant and syndicalist Gérard Filoche.
