= IVP =

IVP may stand for:

- Imperial Valley Press, an American newspaper
- Institutional Venture Partners, a venture capital and growth equity firm
- Insight Venture Partners, a venture capital firm focusing on technology and Internet-related businesses
- International Viewpoint, the monthly magazine of the reunified Fourth International
- International Visitor Program (now called the International Visitor Leadership Program), a professional exchange program funded by the U.S. Department of State
- Initial value problem is an ordinary differential equation together with a specified value, called the initial condition
- Intravenous pyelogram, a radiological procedure used to visualize abnormalities of the urinary system, including the kidneys, ureters, and bladder
- Inter-Varsity Press, the publishing wing of the United Kingdom-based Universities and Colleges Christian Fellowship
- InterVarsity Press (founded 1947), the publishing wing of the United States-based InterVarsity Christian Fellowship
- Intraventricular pressure, the pressure within the ventricles of the heart during different phases of diastole and systole
