= International Institute for Research and Education =

Research and education institute in Amsterdam

The International Institute for Research and Education (IIRE) is a research and educational centre based in Amsterdam, Netherlands. It conducts training and publishes research for and by progressive activists around the world.

The institute was established in Brussels in 1982 by royal charter. It relocated to Amsterdam in the late 1980s.

The IIRE is often associated with the ideas of two of its founding Fellows. Ernest Mandel and Livio Maitan were leaders of the Fourth International in the decades after the Second World War. Their writings have both been published by the institute. After Mandel's death the IIRE was selected to house the Ernest Mandel Study Centre, which opened in 1995.

In 2006, the IIRE moved out from its old premises near Vondelpark. The new premises, in Zeeburg were inaugurated in September 2007.

== Fellows ==
The institute's Fellows are:

- Gilbert Achcar (Lebanon/France), SOAS, political scientist and author of books including Clash of Barbarisms and Eastern Cauldron, editor of The Legacy of Ernest Mandel.
- Daniel Bensaïd (France), Université de Paris VIII, author of numerous studies in philosophy, sociology and politics including Les discordances du temps.
- Susan Caldwell (Canada), Dawson College, lecturer in psychology, women's studies and North-South studies
- Noam Chomsky, (United States)
- James D. Cockcroft (United States/Canada), author and Latin Americanist whose new books in 2000-01 were La esperanza de México, América Latina, Latino Visions, and Salvador Allende.
- Stephanie Coontz (United States), Evergreen State College, historian, author of feminist studies including The Social Origins of Private Life and The Way We Never Were.
- Peter Drucker (United States/Netherlands)
- Penelope Duggan (United Kingdom/France)
- Eva Ferraren (Philippines/Netherlands)
- Janette Habel (France), Université de Paris VIII, author of Ruptures à Cuba.
- Michel Husson (France), Institut national de la statistique et des études économiques, author of workers including Sommes-nous trop?
- Claudio Katz (Argentina)
- Michael Löwy (Brazil/France), Centre National de la Recherche Scientifique-Paris, sociologist of religion and author of many books including Redemption and Utopia. (see his articles in French on ecosocialism and in Spanish on Che Guevara )
- David Mandel (Canada), Université du Québec à Montréal, political scientist and editor of the bilingual Russian-North American journal Alternatives.
- Braulio Moro (Mexico), economist.
- Pierre Rousset (France), former IIRE director, author of works on both East Asian politics and ecology, and chair of the ecology working group of ATTAC.
- Catherine Samary (France), Dauphine University, Paris, economist and specialist on Eastern Europe, author of works including Yugoslavia Dismembered.
- Tony Smith (United States), Iowa State University, philosopher and author of books including Dialectical Social Theory and Its Critics.
- Eric Toussaint (Belgium), director, Committee for Cancellation of Third World Debt, author of works on Latin American history and international political economy.
- Josette Trat (France), Université de Paris VIII, author of works of feminist theory and former editor of Cahiers du féminisme.
- Marcel van der Linden (Netherlands), International Institute of Social History, labour historian and co-editor of The Formation of Labour Movements, 1870-1914.
- François Vercammen (Belgium), Ernest Mandel Foundation, director of the IIRE's Brussels research centre.
- Peter Waterman (Netherlands/United Kingdom) specializes on the new social unionism, on the new global solidarity movements and on global solidarity culture and communications. He has recently written or co-edited, Labour Worldwide in the Era of Globalisation, Globalisation, Social Movements and the New Internationalisms, Place, Space and the New Labour Internationalisms, and Labour Rights in the Global Economy. He also writes about and is active on the internet.
