= Catherine Samary =

French researcher (born 1945)

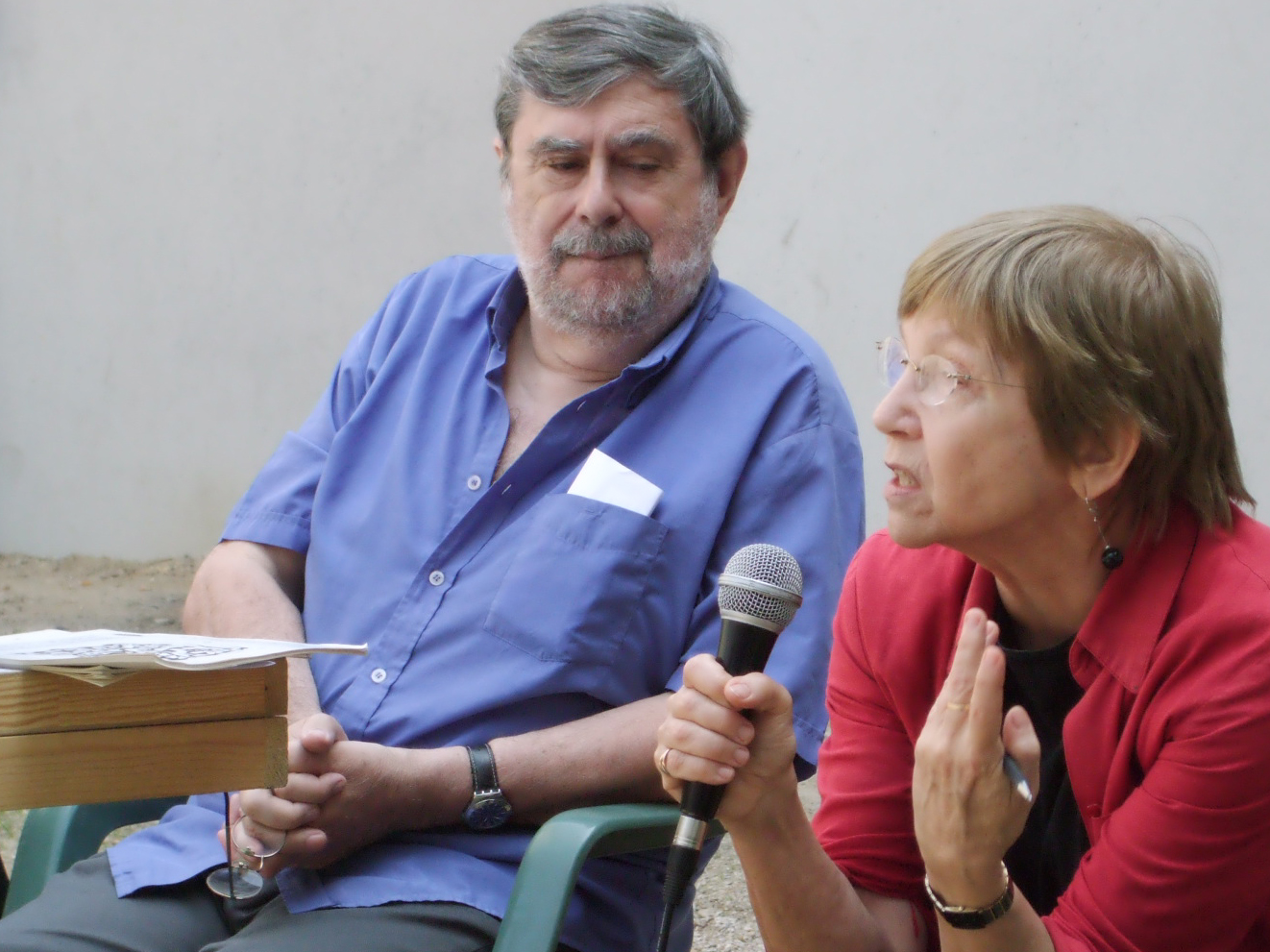
Catherine Samary in 2013.

Catherine Samary born in 1945, is a French researcher in political economy, specialized on the former Yugoslavia and Eastern Europe. She received her PhD in economics in 1986: her thesis on the contradictory logics of the reforms in the Yugoslav self-management system was published in 1988.

She was until her retirement a lecturer at the Paris, Dauphine University. She is a regular lecturer at the International Institute for Research and Education, in Amsterdam.

She wrote in French several books, essays and articles on the Yugoslav experience including Yugoslavia Dismembered. She developed comparative analysis of the different experiences and reforms of the Soviet planning system.

Samary put emphasis on specific phases of democratic mass movements in those countries (like in 1968 in Czechoslovakia or later in Poland) compared to their socio-economic transformations through the capitalist restoration after 1989.

She is member of the scientific council of the French Attac and of the editorial board of its Review Les Possibles; founding member of the Association Autogestion (self-management) and of the European Network in solidarity with Ukraine. She has been involved in its delegations to Ukraine in relation with the left political, trade unionist and feminist networks.

In 1973 she joined the Fourth International and she is member of its broad international leadership body, the International Committee. She was a co-founder of what was for many years its largest section, the Revolutionary Communist League.

She contributed a chapter of the book (coordinated by Gilbert Achcar, in French and English) about The Legacy of Ernest Mandel.

She was actively involved in debates over the 2004 French law banning Muslim girls from wearing headscarves in public schools. She documented three years of conflicts on this issue in an article titled Au-delà du voile et de la laïcité (Beyond the Scarf and Laicity), published on the website Les mots sont importants. She also published an analysis of French secularism as "not anti-religious".

She is a regular contributor to the reviews Contretemps, Inprecor, International Viewpoint, VientoSur.

Samary wrote D'un communisme décolonial à la démocratie des communs in the context of the anniversary of October Revolution in 2017, published by Editions Le Croquant in French. The book presents the Yugoslav experience as a break with Stalin's orientation. And it is revisited in the context of the ongoing debates on the commons. Its extended version in English (co-edited with Fred Leplat) was published under the title Decolonial Communism: Democracy and the Commons. Published by Resistance Books, Merlin Press and the IIRE, 2019.
