= Internationalist League of Norway =

The Internationalist League of Norway (Norwegian: Forbundet Internasjonalen i Noreg (FIN) is a group of revolutionary socialists, set up in 1999, working in sympathy with the Fourth International. Until 2002 FIN worked as a current within the Red Electoral Alliance advocating that the Red Electoral Alliance should be a broad party for revolutionaries on Norway, based on internationalism, anti-stalinism and internal democracy. Since 2002 FIN operates both within the Red Party and the Socialist Left Party.
