= Arbeiter und Soldat =

Underground German-language Communist magazine produced in France during World War II

Arbeiter und Soldat (meaning Worker and Soldier in English) was a clandestine magazine produced for German soldiers by the French Trotskyist group Parti Ouvrier Internationaliste during the World War II Nazi occupation of France. Its editor was a Jewish exile from Berlin named Martin Monath.

The publication ardently opposed fascism but also refused to extend support to the western Allies, characterising them as imperialist. Six issues of the paper were published between 1943 and 1944, despite fierce repression of the far-left press by the Milice and Gestapo.

In August 2008 the archive of extant issues was republished in English. A new English translation was included in a biography of Martin Monath in October 2019.
