= Krivine =

Krivine is a surname. Notable people with the surname include:

- Alain Krivine (1941–2022), French politician
- Emmanuel Krivine (born 1947), French conductor
- Jean-Louis Krivine (born 1939), French Mathematician, inventor of the Krivine machine

Alain, Emmanuel, and Jean-Louis Krivine belongs to the Krivine family
