= Martin Monath =

German Jewish Trotskyist resistance fighter

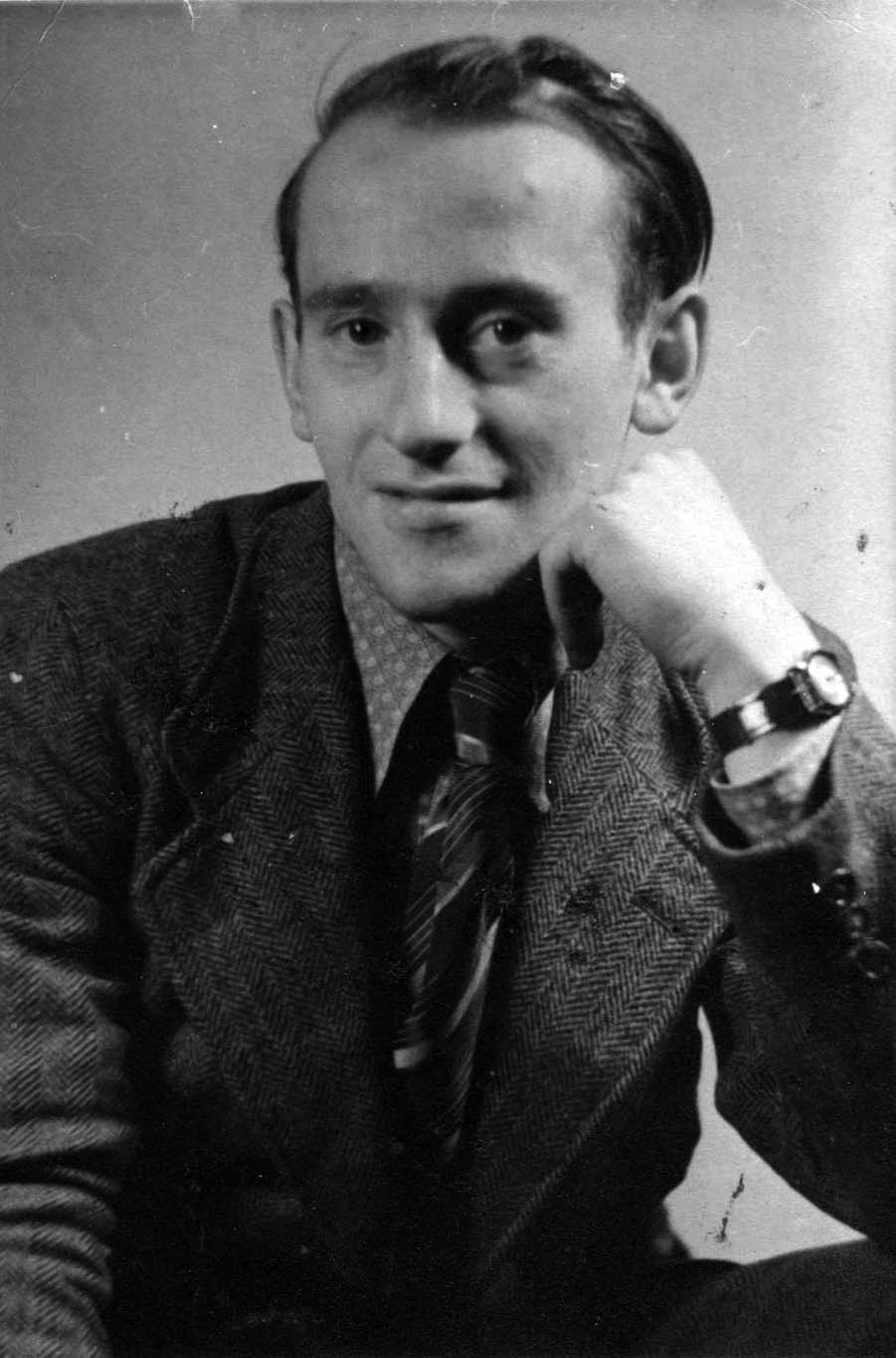
Martin Monath

Martin Ludwig Monath (name later changed to Martin Witlin, and also known by pseudonyms such as Paul Widelin and Viktor) (5 January 1913 – August 1944) was a German Jewish Trotskyist resistance fighter.

== Life ==
Monath was born in Berlin. His parents, Baruch (Bernhard) and Emilie Monath, had moved from Ternopil to Berlin in 1904. In 1931, Monath joined the Socialist-Zionist youth organization Hashomer Hatzair and became a member of its national leadership in Germany.

Around 1940, he joined the Revolutionary Communist Party (Belgium) alongside Abraham Leon and Ernest Mandel. In the summer of 1943, Monath became a member of the Provisional European Secretariat of the Fourth International, responsible for the "German work."

In 1943 in Paris, alongside Paul and Clara Thalmann, he began publishing the newspaper Arbeiter und Soldat (Worker and Soldier) for German soldiers in France. In August 1944, Monath was arrested and murdered by the Gestapo.
