= Abraham Leon =

Belgian activist (1918–1944)

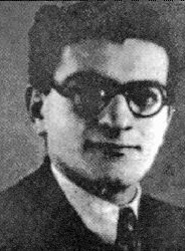
- Photo of Abraham Leon
- Born: 22 October 1918; Warsaw
- Died: 1 September 1944 (aged 25); Auschwitz concentration camp
- Political party: Fourth International

Abraham (Abram) Leon (born Abraham Wejnstok; October 22, 1918 - September 1944) was a Polish-born Belgian Jewish Trotskyist party leader and theorist, who was murdered in 1944 by the Nazis at the Auschwitz death camp.

== Biography ==
Leon was born in Warsaw on October 22, 1918. His parents, adherents of "official petit-bourgeois Zionism", left Poland to pursue the Zionist dream in Palestine; the family quickly re-emigrated in 1926 to Belgium. Leon became a member and then leader of the Belgian branch of Hashomer Hatzair, a left-wing Zionist youth movement. In 1936, after hearing speeches of the Trotskyist leader Walter Dauge of the Revolutionary Socialist Party to militant Belgian coal miners, Leon was won over politically from Stalinism to Trotskyism. Between 1936 and 1940 Leon slowly and methodically made his political transition from the Hashomer Hatzair to revolutionary Trotskyism.

When the Molotov–Ribbentrop Pact of 1939 threw Dauge's Belgian Trotskyists (and Dauge himself) and the Belgian Communist Party into deep demoralisation, it was Leon who was instrumental in keeping the flame of revolutionary Marxism alive in Belgium. According to Ernest Mandel, "[c]orrectly establishing the reasons which we had for hope, Leon noted that the workers’ movement in Europe had already reached the lowest point of its ebb. It was now necessary to count upon a new rise. It was necessary not to await it passively but to prepare for it, preparing for it the cadres and insofar as possible the masses. [...] When, on August 20, 1940, we were overwhelmed by the tragic news of the assassination of L.D. Trotsky, Leon immediately wrote the first illegal pamphlet of the Belgian Trotskyist movement. He established contact with several former regional leaders of the party in Brussels. The first leadership began to take form. The illegal Trotskyist organization was born on the day following the death of its spiritual father. [...] From this moment on, the story of Leon was linked with the history of the Trotskyist movement in Belgium." At some point, Leon shared an apartment with fellow Trotskyist and resistance leader, the German Martin Monath, to whom he tasked on making work within the Wehrmacht in occupied France.

Mandel credits Leon with being "the principal inspirer of the [Belgian Trotskyist] party". He states that Leon "served as political secretary from the time the first executive committee was set up" and that Leon served as the editor-in-chief of the illegal Belgian Trotskyist newspaper La Voie de Lénine (The Road of Lenin); he also wrote many of the most important articles for this paper.

Leon was also instrumental in making contact with other sections of the Fourth International in wartime Europe – a most difficult and hazardous task; in August 1942, Leon co-organised the first meeting between the Belgian and French Trotskyist parties; he also led the illegal "party work among the proletarian soldiers of the Wehrmacht" and "attended meetings of the underground factory committees" at tremendous risk to himself.

Leon exhorted Belgian workers to fight both Hitler and Churchill in the classical Leninist fashion of turning imperialist World War II into a civil war.

== Arrest, imprisonment, torture, and murder ==
In 1943–1944, as the fascist regime of Benito Mussolini collapsed in Italy, the revolutionary socialist workers of Europe began to sense that the end of the war was near and that with it would come opportunities for revolutionary struggle – as had happened at the end of WWI. Leon, preparing for that eventuality, played a leading role "in the work of the European Conference of the Fourth International" held in February 1944. When news of the Allied landings in Europe reached him, Leon decided that the time had come, finally, when it would once again be safe for him to return to his home in Charleroi; but on the very night of his arrival his home was raided by the police and he was arrested. He was taken to prison and tortured by the Gestapo; yet even under these conditions Leon was able to smuggle letters from prison and establish a tenuous link with his Belgian party comrades. The Nazis wasted no time in deporting Leon to Auschwitz where he was brutalized until he became sick and was then selected by the SS to be sent to the gas chamber. He was thus murdered by the Nazis in September 1944 at the age of 26.

== Theoretical works ==
Leon's most famous work in print is The Jewish Question: A Marxist Interpretation, a work which remains a widely used Marxist analysis of Jewish socio-economic history, antisemitism, and Zionism. Posthumously published in French in 1946, it did not receive much attention on publication, but gained renewed interest in the late 1960s, and early 1970s as the aftermath of the Six Day War revived the relevance of Zionism and anti-Zionism on the political left, becoming the most influential text among critics of Zionism in the New Left. Whilst containing a clear ideological bias and minor historical errors, the text is a thoughtful analysis of the Jewish question from a historical materialist perspective.
