= Het Vrije Woord (Belgian newspaper) =

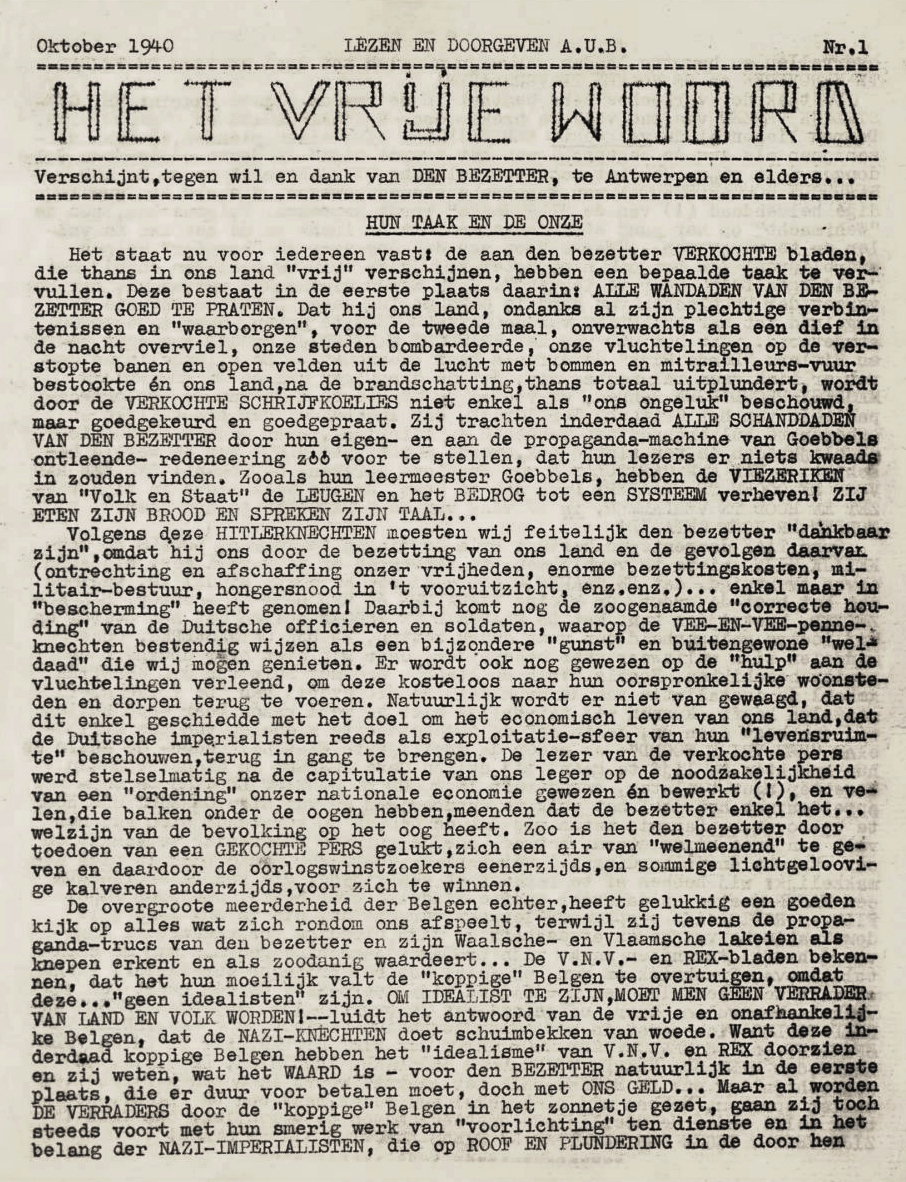
- October 1940 issue
- Editor: Henri Mandel; Ernest Mandel
- Founded: September 25, 1940
- Ceased publication: August 1942
- Relaunched: Vrank en Vrij; Das Freie Wort
- Language: Dutch; Occasionally German
- Circulation: 4,200

Het Vrije Woord (Free Speech) was a Dutch-language newspaper published clandestinely in Belgium during the German occupation in World War II. The Vrije Woord was the result of co-operation largely between various different groups, including Catholics, Jews and Trotskyites and, although its circulation was never as extensive as other Flemish underground newspapers, it was distinguished by its high-brow content.

== Newspaper ==
Het Vrije Woord was published by a small number of people (around 50 at its height) largely from Jewish or communist backgrounds. The group, known as Vrank en Vrij, was based in Flanders, but was able to distribute its publication in Brussels too.

In August 1942, the printing shop was raided, and all the equipment confiscated, although all members were able to escape. The Mandel family, instrumental to the publication, fled to Brussels.

== Vrank en Vrij and Das Freie Wort ==
On arriving in Brussels, the group built two new newspapers. Vrank en Vrij was basically a continuation of Het Vrije Woord which was printed from January 1943 until liberation and achieved a circulation of 4,300. The group also began to regularly publish a German-language newspaper (called Das Freie Wort) aimed at German soldiers. Two German soldiers were involved in its distribution. 21 members of the group responsible for the Vrank en Vrij paper were arrested during the war and 13 died in prison.

== Links ==
- "'Vrank en Vrij' versus the occupying forces". Institute of Social History.
