= Michel Husson =

French statistician and economist (1949–2021)

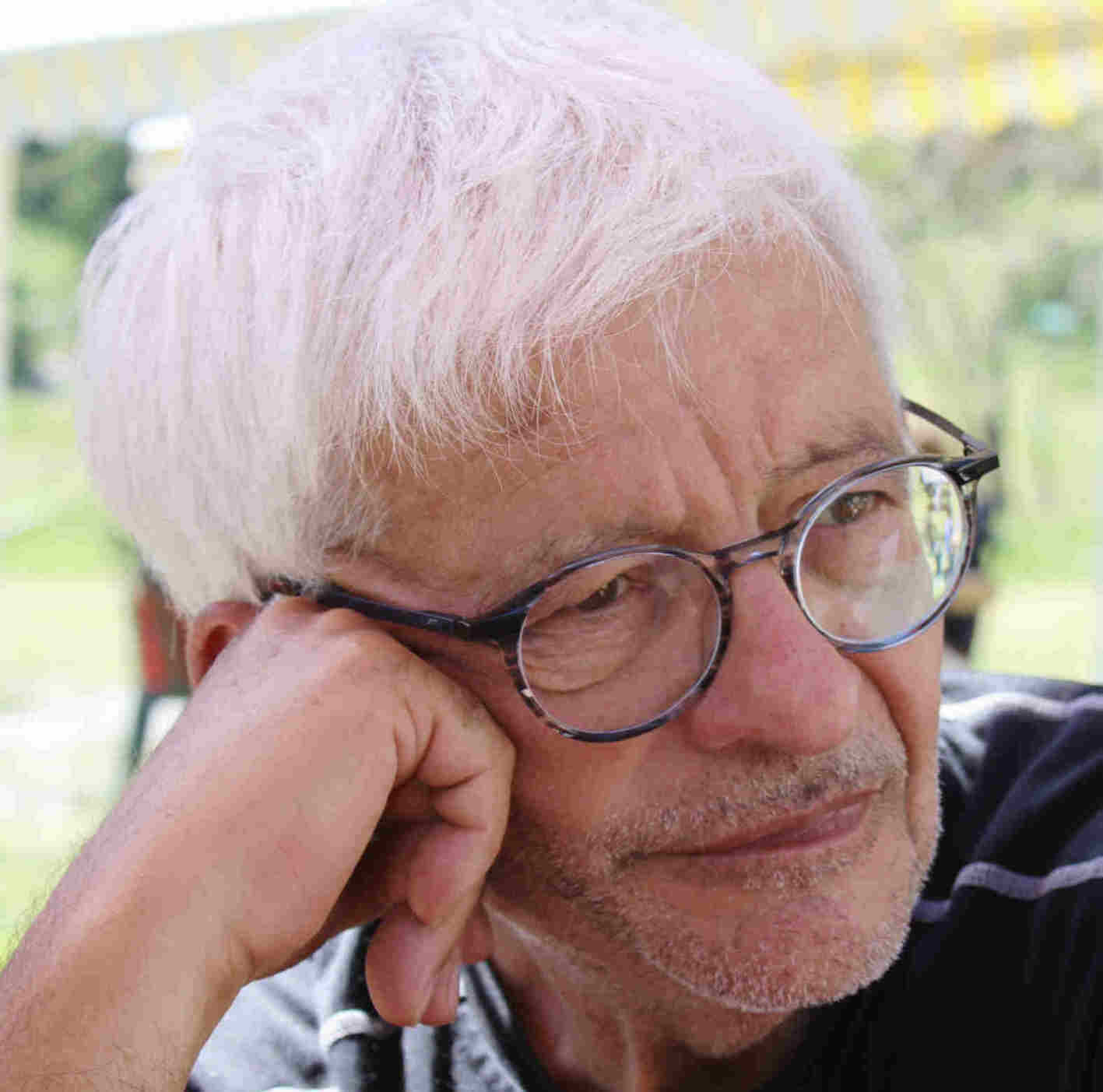
- Husson in 2019
- Born: 3 April 1949; Lyon, France
- Died: 18 July 2021 (aged 72); Corvara, Italy
- Education: Paris Nanterre University
- Occupations: Statistician; Economist
- Political party: Revolutionary Communist League

Michel Husson (3 April 1949 – 18 July 2021) was a French statistician and economist. He was engaged politically with the Unified Socialist Party and Revolutionary Communist League and was an alter-globalist activist.

== Biography ==
=== Education ===
Husson studied economic sciences at Panthéon-Assas University and subsequently at Paris Nanterre University from 1966 to 1970. He then earned a graduate degree in economic sciences at Panthéon-Sorbonne University in 1971. He finished his studies at ENSAE ParisTech from 1971 to 1974.

=== Career ===
Husson began his career as an administrator for the Corps de l'INSEE following his studies. From 1975 to 1984, he directed the economic forecasting department at the Ministry of the Economy and Finance, where he was in charge of macroeconomic modeling work. From 1985 to 1987, he was sent to Mexico to work for the National Institute of Statistics and Geography, where he developed models of the Mexican economy. From 1987 to 1989, he headed the statistical analytics office at the Service des Statistiques Industrielles, Ministère de l'Economie, des Finances et de l'Industrie (SESSI). In 1990, he began working for the Institut de recherches économiques et sociales as head of the group "Emploi".

=== Political activism ===
Husson was an activist within the Unified Socialist Party and the Revolutionary Communist League, for which he served on the central committee from 1995 to 2000. Following disagreements within the party, he left the Revolutionary Communist League in December 2006. He was also a member of the Fondation Copernic and of the scientific council of the Association for the Taxation of Financial Transactions and for Citizens' Action. He was a co-founder of the Agir ensemble contre le chômage in 1993. He notably supported the candidacy of José Bové in the 2007 French presidential election.

During the 2012 French presidential election, Husson signed an appeal of economists supporting the Left Front against Nicolas Sarkozy.

=== Death ===
Michel Husson died in Corvara on 18 July 2021 at the age of 72.

== Publications ==
- Les ajustements de l’emploi (1999)
- Six milliards sur la planète : sommes-nous trop ? (2000)
- Le grand bluff capitaliste (2001)
- Les casseurs de l’État social (2003)
- Travail flexible, salariés jetables (2006)
- Supprimer les licenciements (2006)
- Un pur capitalisme (2008)[article]
- Le capitalisme en 10 leçons. Petit cours illustré hétérodoxe (2012)
