= The Formation of the Economic Thought of Karl Marx =

1967 book by Ernest Mandel

The Formation of the Economic Thought of Karl Marx: 1843 to Capital
- Author: Ernest Mandel
- Original title: La formation de la pensée économique de Karl Marx: de 1843 à la rédaction du "Capital"
- Translator: Brian Pearce
- Language: French
- Subject: Karl Marx
- Published: 1967 (in French); 1971 (in English)
- Publication place: France
- Media type: Print (Hardcover and Paperback)
- Pages: 224 (2015 Verso edition)
- ISBN: 978-1784782320

The Formation of the Economic Thought of Karl Marx: 1843 to Capital (French: La formation de la pensée économique de Karl Marx: de 1843 à la rédaction du "Capital") is a 1967 book by the Marxist theorist Ernest Mandel, in which the author discusses the economic theories of Karl Marx. It appeared in English translation in 1971.

== Reception ==
The Formation of the Economic Thought of Karl Marx received a positive review in Telos from James E. Hansen when the work was published in English in 1971. Hansen welcomed Mandel's book as important contribution to scholarship on Marx. The political scientist David McLellan called Mandel's work "excellent". McLellan recommended the book, together with Mandel's An Introduction to Marxist Economic Theory, as the best introduction to Marx's economics.

== See also ==
- Capital: Critique of Political Economy
