= Otto Schüssler =

Otto Schüssler (August 8, 1905 – 1982) was a German Communist. He sometimes used the pseudonyms Oskar Fischer and Julián Suárez.

Schüssler was born in 1905 to a working-class family in Leipzig. He became an important leader of the Trotskyist movement in Weimar Germany.

In the spring of 1932, Leon Trotsky's son, Lev Sedov, who at that time was living in Berlin, was looking for a German-speaking secretary for his father. Schüssler was offered the job and went to the island of Prinkipo in Turkey, where Trotsky was living in exile. Schüssler became one of Trotsky's closest collaborators, and in November 1932 he accompanied Trotsky on his trip to Copenhagen.

In 1933, Schüssler went back to Germany to attend some meetings of the German Trotskyist group, which had now been labeled an "illegal organization" after Adolf Hitler and the Nazi Party rose to power. This situation was very difficult. Otto Schüssler decided to move to Prague in Czechoslovakia, where he participated in the publication of illegal communist papers and pamphlets, using the pseudonym "Oskar Fischer."

In Paris in 1938, Schüssler participated at the founding of the Fourth International. After that, Schüssler decided to go to Mexico, where Trotsky was now living. He arrived in Coyoacán in February 1939 where he started working as Trotsky's secretary and bodyguard.

When on May 24, 1940, a machine-gun assault by Mexican Stalinists took place against Trotsky's household, Otto Schüssler, together with Charles Cornell (one of Trotsky's guards from the United States and a member of the Socialist Workers Party), was arrested by the Mexican police. At first the police suspected Trotsky and his secretaries of having staged the raid, but soon realized that idea to be wrong. After two days and at the personal intervention of Trotsky, both Schüssler and Cornell were released.

A second murder attempt on August 20 by NKVD agent Ramón Mercader succeeded. Schüssler remained in Mexico, took a job, and continued to be active in the Mexican section of the Fourth International under his Mexican pseudonym, "Julián Suárez." By the end of the 1940s, he gave up politics and broke off contact with all former friends and comrades.

He married mexican primary teacher Susana Ogazón Sánchez and had four children, Otto, Susana, Ida and Erika.

== Sources ==
- "Trotskyana". Trotskyist biographical sketches.
