= Inprecor =

Trotskyist magazine

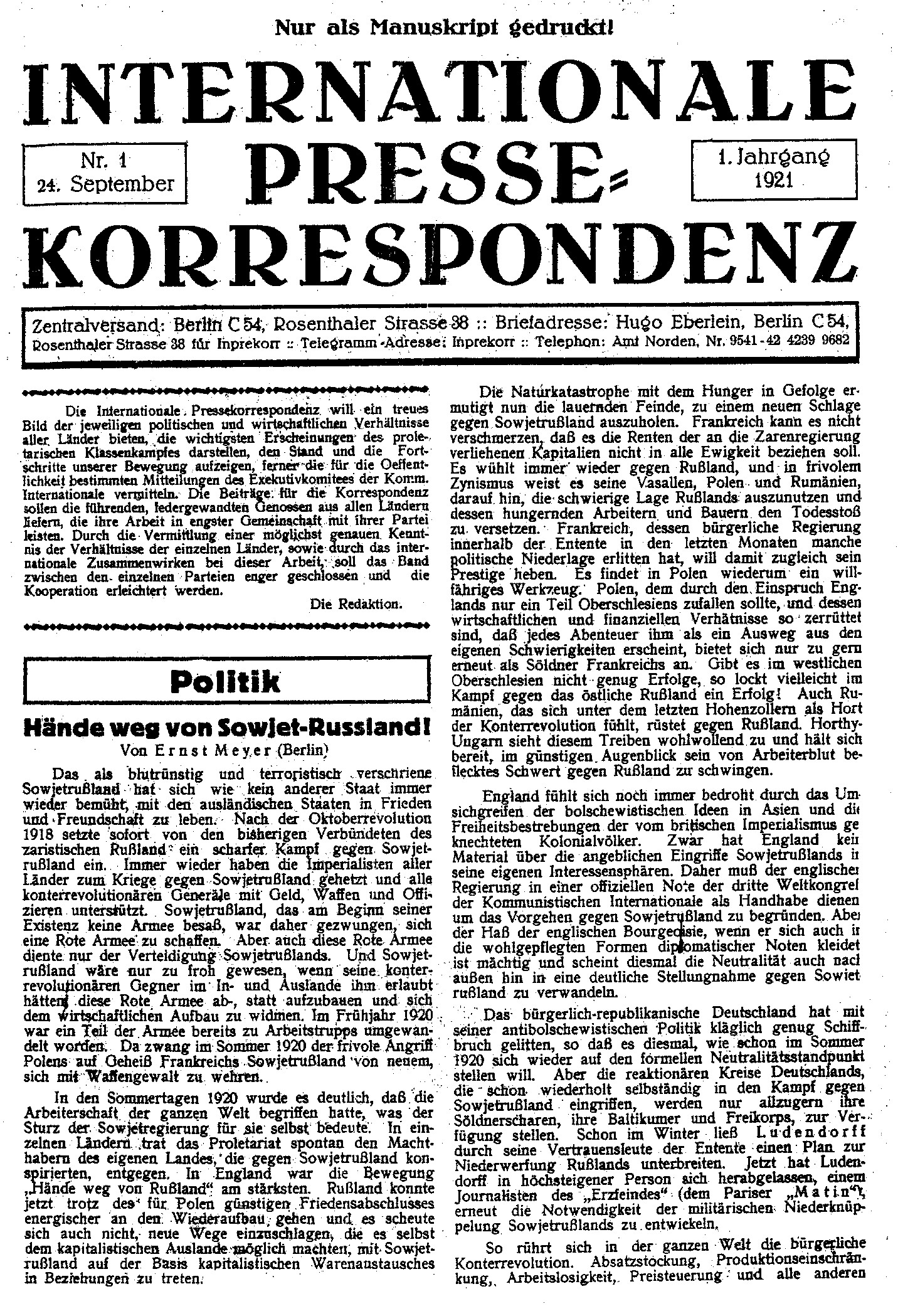
Inprecor

Inprecor is a multilingual monthly Marxist magazine published by the reunified Fourth International. Its name is a contraction of International Press Correspondence and indicates that the magazine translates articles and letters from revolutionaries around the world.

Inprecor was established by the Third International in the wake of the Russian Revolution to allow communists to read the documents and thoughts of their comrades around the world. The Third International closed Inprecor in July 1938, replacing it with World News and Views.

After World War II, Ernest Mandel successfully proposed that the Fourth International assumed responsibility for the production of Inprecor. Since 1973, four parallel editions have been produced by the United Secretariat of the Fourth International: in French Inprecor, German Inprekorr, Spanish Punto de Vista Internacional and English International Viewpoint.

In 1977, the United Secretariat merged the English language edition of Inprecor with Intercontinental Press, edited by Joseph Hansen. The new publication, 'Intercontinental Press/Inprecor', was based in the New York offices of the Socialist Workers Party (US). After Hansen's death, political differences between the SWP and the United Secretariat grew to the point where the SWP leadership took control of the magazine, renaming it 'Intercontinental Press' and eventually closing the magazine. In 1982 the United Secretariat reestablished an English-language edition of Inprecor, International Viewpoint, which is edited in Europe.
