= Charles Cornell =

American communist (1911–1989)

Charles Olney Cornell (1911–1989) was an American Communist.

Cornell was born on March 14, 1911, in Cochise, Arizona. While a teacher in San Francisco in the 1930s, he became active in the American Trotskyist movement and joined the newly founded Socialist Workers Party in 1938.

The SWP proposed that Charles Cornell go to Coyoacán, Mexico, where Leon Trotsky was living in exile to work as one of his bodyguards. Cornell served on Trotsky’s staff from June 1939 to August 1940.

On May 24, 1940, Mexican Stalinists machine-gunned Trotsky's household and subsequently Charles Cornell and Otto Schüssler, one of Trotsky's guards from Germany, were arrested by the police.

At first the police suspected Trotsky and his secretaries of having organised the raid, but soon realized this to be wrong. After two days and at the personal intervention of Trotsky, both Schüssler and Cornell were released.

Cornell, who was present, could not prevent the fatal attack on Trotsky three months later on August 20, 1940, carried out by the Stalinist agent Ramón Mercader, who had infiltrated the household and stabbed him in the back of the head with an icepick.

With Joe Hansen, Cornell overwhelmed the assassin and handed him over to the police.

On his return to the United States, Charles Cornell remained a member of the Socialist Workers Party in New York City for a couple of years, but never had any important role in the party. Eventually he gave up political activities and went into the real-estate business, first in Connecticut, and later in Arizona. He died on January 1, 1989.
