= Daniel Bensaïd =

French philosopher (1946–2010)

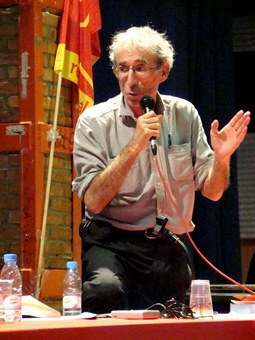
- Bensaïd at a conference in Barcelona in April 2008
- Born: Daniel Ben Saïd; 25 March 1946; Toulouse, France
- Died: 12 January 2010 (aged 63); Paris, France

Education
- Education: École normale supérieure de Saint-Cloud; University of Paris X

Philosophical work
- Era: 20th-century philosophy
- Region: Western philosophy
- School: Trotskyism
- Institutions: University of Paris-VIII
- Main interests: Political theory

Daniel Bensaïd (born Daniel Ben Saïd; 25 March 1946 – 12 January 2010) was a philosopher and a leader of the Trotskyist movement in France. He became a leading figure in the student revolt of 1968, while studying at the University of Paris X-Nanterre.

== Life and career ==
Bensaïd was born in Toulouse, France, to a father who was a Sephardic Jew from Algeria, and who had moved from Oran, where he met Bensaïd's mother, to Vichy Toulouse. In response to the 8 February 1962 Charonne massacre of Algerians in Paris, Bensaïd joined the Union of Communist Students. Irritated by the party orthodoxy he swiftly became part of a left opposition within the union, and was among the dissidents expelled from the party in 1966.

In 1966, Bensaïd began studying at the École normale supérieure de Saint-Cloud, where he helped found the Jeunesse Communiste Révolutionnaire, which became the Ligue Communiste Révolutionnaire (LCR). With Daniel Cohn-Bendit he helped to found the Mouvement du 22 Mars (Movement of 22 March), which was involved in the protests of May 1968 in France.

Bensaïd became a leading theorist of the LCR and the United Secretariat of the Fourth International, and a professor of philosophy at the University of Paris-VIII. He was also a Fellow at the International Institute for Research and Education. Upon his death, Tariq Ali described him as "France's leading Marxist public intellectual, much in demand on talkshows and writing essays and reviews in Le Monde and Libération." Bensaïd was known for his studies of Walter Benjamin and Karl Marx, and a recent analysis of French postmodernism.

He died of cancer on 12 January 2010 at the age of 63, arising from the side effects of drugs used to treat AIDS, which he had had for the previous 16 years.

== Criticism and debate ==
Bensaïd and the current of Trotskyism represented by the Unified Secretariat of the Fourth International have come under attack from more orthodox Trotskyists for the strategy they have advanced of entering the "new social movements"; in particular, for seeing reform and revolution as a false dichotomy, and proposing the formation of "broad parties," rather than forming parties of the traditional Leninist type. In one such critique, Luke Cooper criticised Bensaïd for arguing that—in certain specific circumstances—it maybe permissible to enter a capitalist government, and seek to use the existing state as an instrument of revolutionary transformation. Bensaïd also debated revolutionary strategy with other Fourth International members, and the British Socialist Workers Party's International Secretary Alex Callinicos.

== Bibliography ==
- with Henri Weber : Mai 1968: Une répétition générale (François Maspero, 1968, online edition)
- La revolution et le pouvoir (Penser, 1976, ISBN 9782234005525)
- "In Memory of a Rebel". Telos 44, Summer 1980 (doi:10.3817/0680044193).
- Moi, la Révolution : remembrances d'une bicentenaire indigne (Gallimard 1989)
- Walter Benjamin: sentinelle messianique (Plon, 1990, ISBN 9782350960432)
- La discordance des temps: essais sur les crises, les classes, l'histoire (Editions de la Passion, 1995, ISBN 9782906229266)
- Marx l'intempestif: Grandeurs et misères d'une aventure critique (Fayard, 1995, ISBN 9782213595047); English translation: A Marx for Our Times: Adventures and Misadventures of a Critique (Verso, 2002, ISBN 9781859847121)
- Le pari mélancolique (Fayard, 1997, ISBN 9782213599274)
- Qui est le juge? (Fayard, 1999, ISBN 9782213603506)
- Contes et légendes de la guerre éthique (Textuel, 1999, ISBN 9782909317939)
- Eloge de la résistance à l'air du temps (Textuel, 1999, ISBN 9782909317779)
- Le sourire du spectre (Michalon, 2000, ISBN 9782841861248)
- Les irréductibles (Textuel, 2001, ISBN 9782845970137)
- Une lente impatience (Stock, 2004, ISBN 9782234056596) - his autobiography; English translation: An Impatient Life: A Memoir (Verso, 2014, ISBN 9781781681084)
- Fragments mécréants. Mythes identitaires et république imaginaire (2005, ISBN 9782849380413)
- Marx, mode d'emploi (2009, ISBN 9782707182791)
