= Albert Lautman =

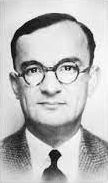

Albert Lautman (8 February 1908 – 1 August 1944) was a French philosopher of mathematics, born in Paris. An escaped prisoner of war, he was shot by the Nazi authorities in Toulouse on 1 August 1944.

== Family ==
His father was a Jewish emigrant from Vienna who became a medical doctor after he was seriously wounded in the First World War.

== Selected bibliography ==
- Essai sur les Notions de Structure et d'Existence en Mathématiques
- Essai sur l'Unité des Sciences Mathématiques
- Symétrie et Dissymétrie en Mathématiques et en Physique
- Les Mathématiques, les idées et le réel physique

Translations

- Mathematics, Ideas and the Physical Real (2011) - this volume advertises itself as "the first English collection of the work of Albert Lautman" ISBN 978-1-4411-2344-2
