= Roseline Vachetta =

French politician (born 1951)

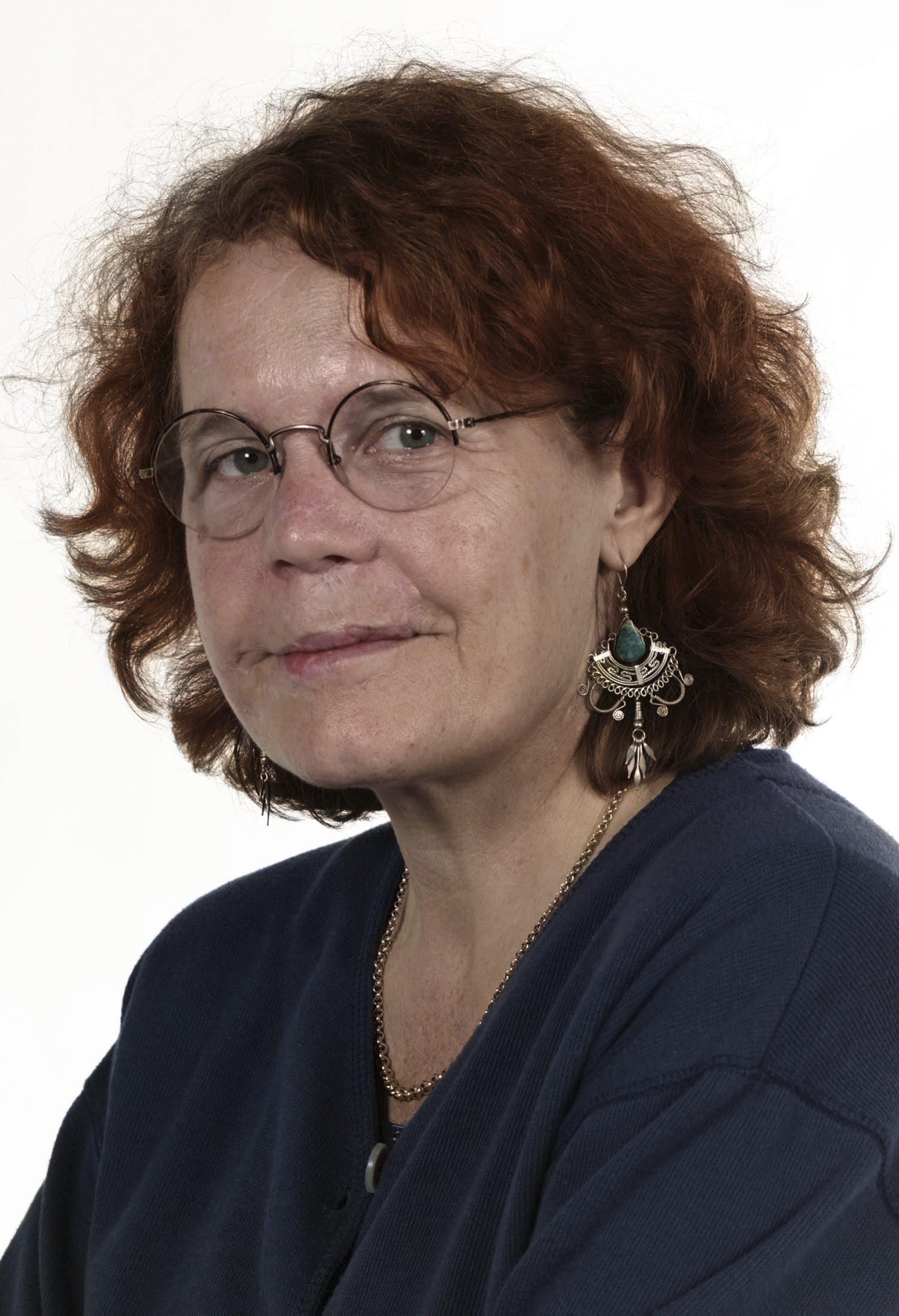
Image of Roseline Vachetta

Roseline Vachetta (born 12 December 1951 in Le Mans) is a French Trotskyist politician.

She became a member of the Revolutionary Communist League (LCR) and in 1999 was elected to the European Parliament. She lost her seat in 2004, but remained one of the LCR's three spokespersons until the party was dissolved in February 2009.
