= International Viewpoint =

International Viewpoint is the English-language online magazine of the Trotskyist reunified Fourth International. It focuses on publishing articles on the political and social situation throughout the world, notably by translating articles into English written by socialists in other languages. Its ISSN is ISSN 0294-2925.

The International also publishes a magazine in French Inprecor. The German-speaking sections produce the German Inprekorr. The Spanish-language Punto de vista internacional site is under the responsibility of the Spanish-speaking sections of the International.

The magazine was established in 1982 to replace Intercontinental Press, which for a brief period had been the common English-language publication of the Fourth International having merged with the English-language Inprecor of the 1970s. In 1995, International Viewpoint absorbed International Marxist Review, the Fourth International's theoretical magazine in English.

The magazine has a network of correspondents in over 50 countries who report on popular struggles, and the debates that are shaping the left. Penelope Duggan edits the magazine. Its editorial board includes two leaders of Socialist Resistance: Terry Conway and Alan Thornett. A key figure in the early years, Phil Hearse, is no longer active, while Greg Tucker was the original webmaster.

In January 2005 International Viewpoint was relaunched as an online magazine supplemented by a pdf edition, which is printed and distributed locally. According to a 2008 letter to subscribers, around 500,000 visits are made to the website every year, up from 250,000 in 2006.

== See also ==
- Inprecor (1973–1979)
- Intercontinental Press (1963–1983)
