= Revolutionary Communist League (France) =

Revolutionary Communist League Ligue communiste révolutionnaire
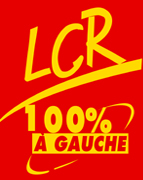
- Leader: Collective leadership (Central committee); three spokespersons: Olivier Besancenot, Alain Krivine, Roseline Vachetta
- Founded: 1930
- Dissolved: 5 February 2009
- Succeeded by: New Anticapitalist Party (NPA)
- Headquarters: 2, rue Richard-Lenoir, 93100 Montreuil
- Youth wing: Young Revolutionary Communists
- Ideology: Communism; Trotskyism
- Political position: Far-left
- European affiliation: European Anti-capitalist Left
- International affiliation: Fourth International
- Colours: Red

The Revolutionary Communist League (French: Ligue communiste révolutionnaire; (Note: French pronunciation: [liɡ kɔmynist ʁevɔlysjɔnɛːʁ].) LCR) (Note: French pronunciation: [ɛl se ɛʁ].) was a Trotskyist political party in France. It was the French section of the Fourth International (post-reunification). It published the weekly newspaper Rouge and the journal Critique communiste. Established in 1974, it became the leading party of the French far-left in the 2000s. It officially abolished itself on 5 February 2009 to merge with smaller factions of the far-left and form the New Anticapitalist Party.

== History ==
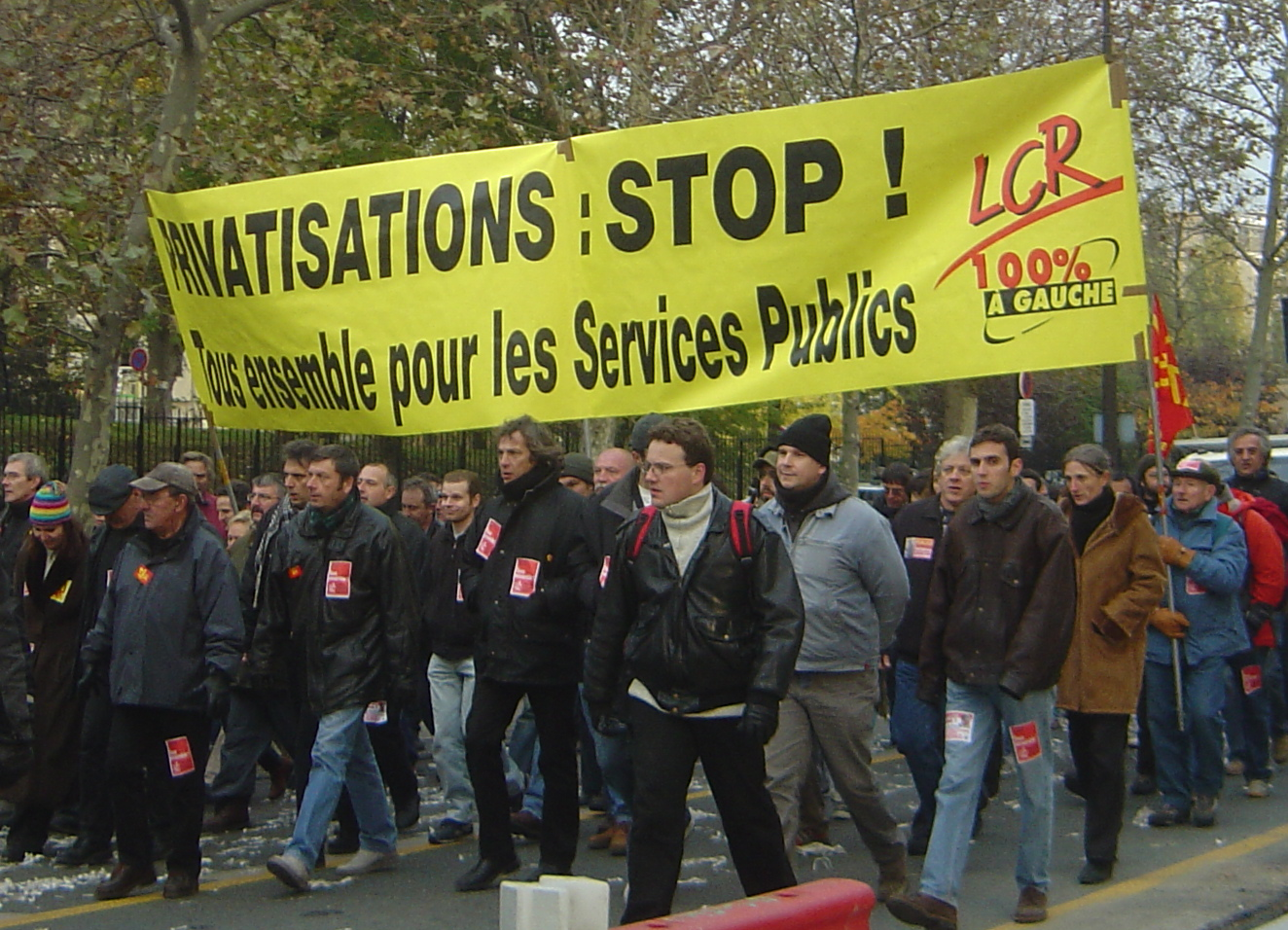
LCR protesters marching in a workforce demonstration in favour of public services and against privatisation

It was founded in 1974, after its forerunner the Communist League (Ligue Communiste) was banned in 1973. The Communist League was itself founded in 1969 after the Revolutionary Communist Youth (Jeunesses Communistes Révolutionnaires), which was banned in 1968, had merged with Pierre Frank's Internationalist Communist Party. The group included members of other Trotskyist tendencies who were able to organise openly within its ranks to gain support for their views.

Its official spokespersons were Alain Krivine, Roseline Vachetta, who are former members of the European Parliament, and Olivier Besancenot who was the party's candidate for the presidential elections in 2002 and 2007.

A major issue in the party's latter years was the possibility and conditions of electoral alliances with other left wing forces, such as the fellow Trotskyist party Lutte Ouvrière. In the past the two had at times run joint candidates (for example in the last regional and European elections), and at times ran separately (for example in the 2002 and 2007 presidential elections).

In a situation where massive campaigns against government policy have brought millions into the streets, but established political parties have lost a lot of credibility, the idea of unifying the radical Left in an electoral alliance was much discussed. There were for example talks for an alliance with the French Communist Party, after both parties worked together on the victorious campaign of the 'No' in the 2005 French referendum on the Constitution of the European Union. Relations between the two parties had been improving since Marie-George Buffet took over the leadership of the PCF.

LCR militants openly worked within left-wing groups such as ATTAC and the Solidaires Unitaires Démocratiques trade unions, although both are independent from political parties (and have members from other political backgrounds).

=== Dissolution ===
The Revolutionary Communist League was the leading force in the creation of the New Anticapitalist Party, launched in June 2008, which was intended to unify the parties and movements of the far left.

On 5 February 2009, 87,1% of party members voted to dissolve the Revolutionary Communist League, with 11.5% voting against. The dissolution was intended solely to enable the LCR to become the New Anticapitalist Party. Alain Krivine, who had been one of the party's founders, said: "We're not dissolving, as such. We'll continue the revolutionary struggle, with a tool that's much better suited for it than the LCR."

== Presidential elections (2002 and 2007) ==
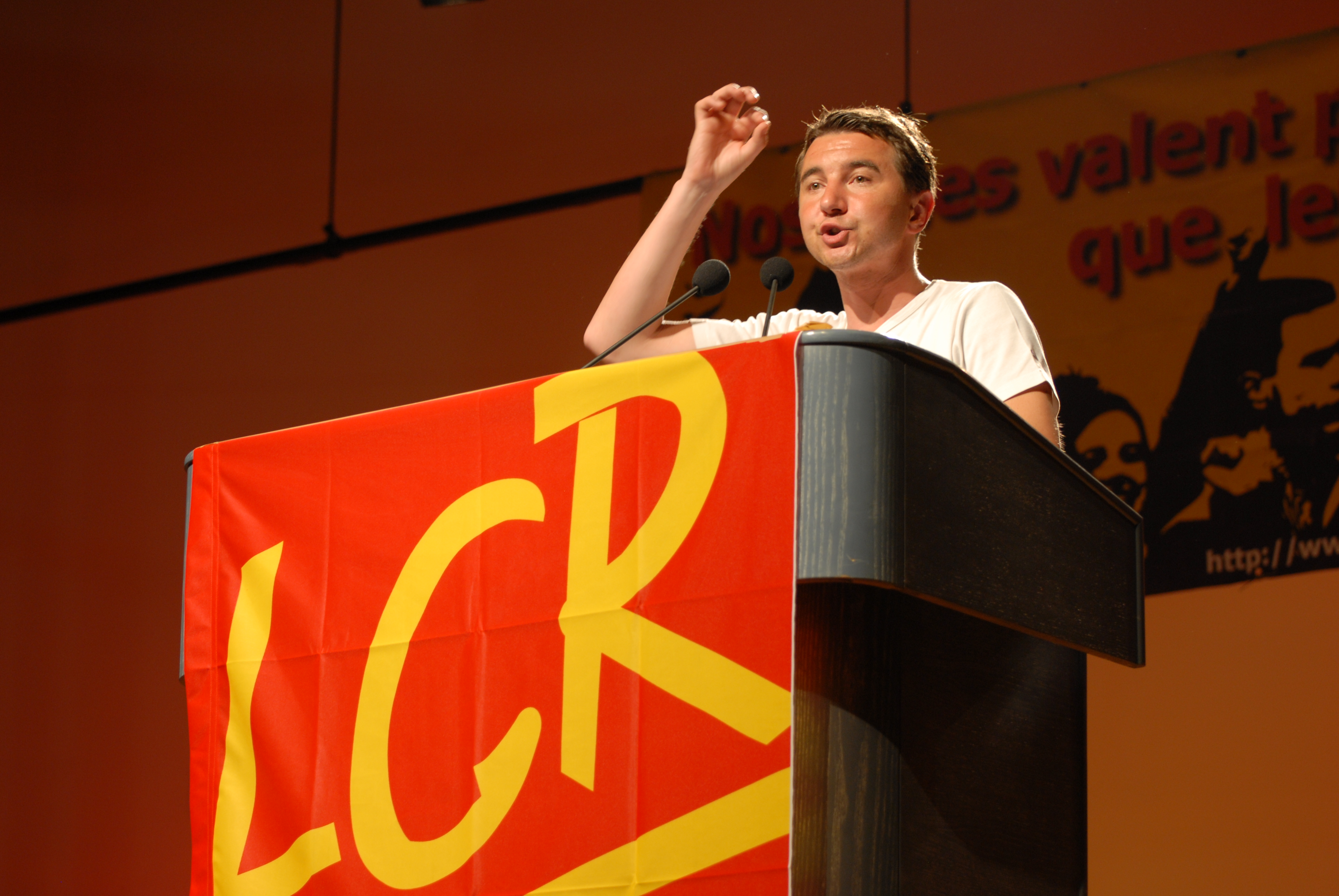
Olivier Besancenot, holding a meeting as LCR candidate for the 2007 presidential election

In France's 2002 presidential election, the LCR's candidate Olivier Besancenot won 4.25% of the vote. Thus the far left (LCR, Lutte Ouvrière and Parti des travailleurs) gained a total of more than 10%. The run-off election provided voters with only a choice between the right-wing Chirac and the far-right Le Pen. The left in its vast majority voted for Chirac. The LCR did not call for abstention: the LCR campaigned to "minimize the vote to Le Pen". The LCR campaign was run under the slogan "Beat Le Pen on the streets and in the ballot box". A minority within the LCR were opposed to this slogan, believing that it amounted to a call to vote for Chirac.

For the 2007 French presidential election, the LCR's candidate was again Olivier Besancenot, gaining around 4.1% at the first round. As he fell under the 5% barrier, the state did not cover the campaign's expenses above 800,000 euros. However, as the party spent approximatively this sum, according to Pierre-François Grond, a member of the direction, it will not be financially affected by Besancenot's lower score.

== See also ==
- Alain Krivine
- Daniel Bensaïd
- Olivier Besancenot
- Michael Lowy
- Catherine Samary
- Philippe Poutou
- Politics of France
- Lutte Ouvrière
- Workers' Party (France)
- Trotskyism in France

=== French articles ===
- Jeunesses communistes révolutionnaires
