= Ernest Mandel =

Belgian economist and Marxist philosopher (1923–1995)

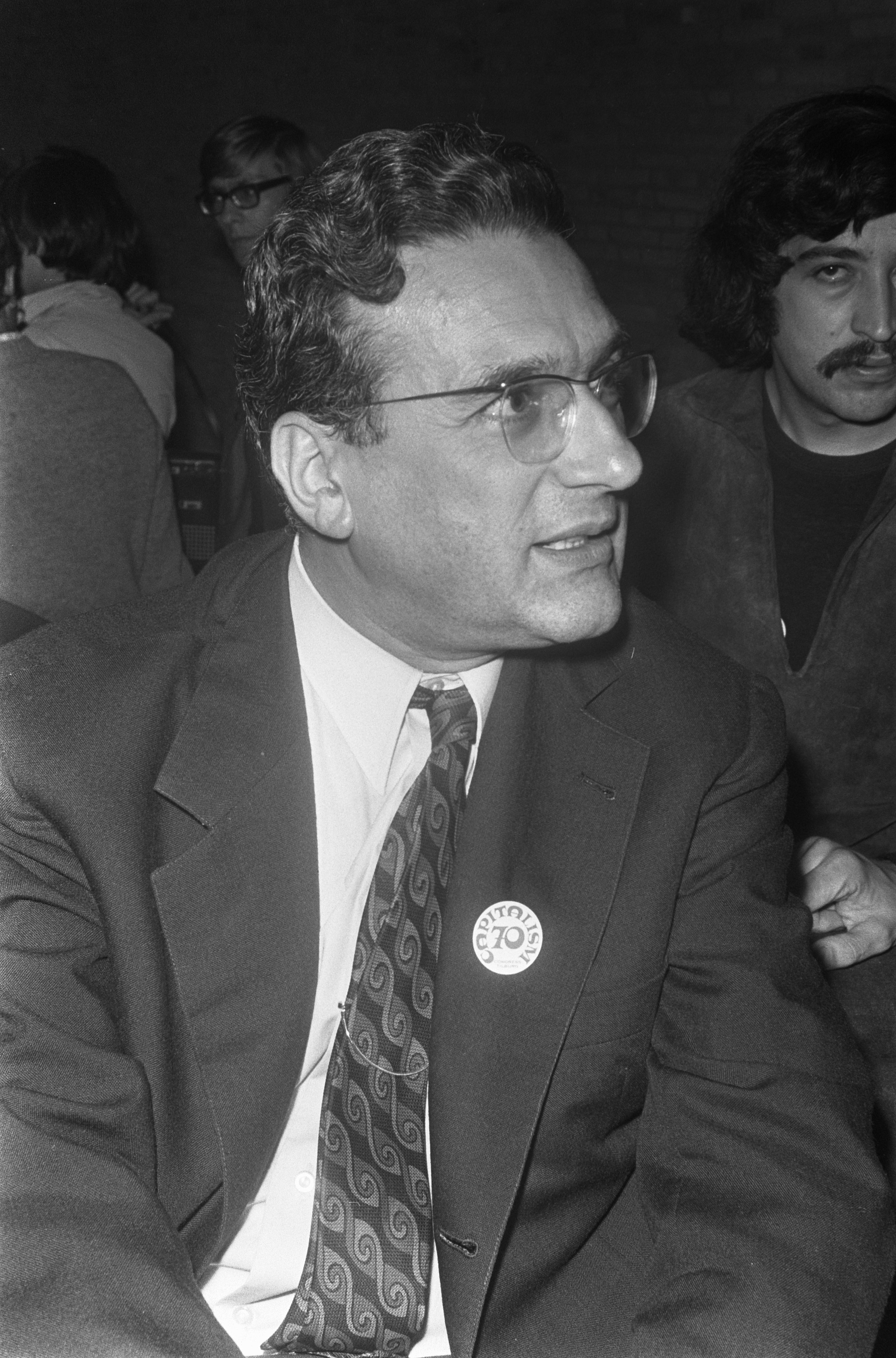
Mandel in 1970

Ernest Ezra Mandel (Dutch: [ˈɛrnəst mɑnˈdɛl]; 5 April 1923 – 20 July 1995), also known by various pseudonyms such as Ernest Germain, Pierre Gousset, Henri Vallin, Walter, was a Belgian Marxian economist, Trotskyist activist and theorist, and Holocaust survivor. He fought in the underground resistance against the Nazis during the occupation of Belgium.

== Life ==
Born in Frankfurt, Mandel was recruited to the Belgian section of the international Trotskyist movement, the Fourth International, in his youth in Antwerp. His parents, Henri and Rosa Mandel, were Jewish emigres from Poland, the former a member of Rosa Luxemburg's and Karl Liebknecht's Spartacist League. The beginning of Mandel's period at university was interrupted when the German occupying forces closed the university.

During World War II, while still a teenager, he joined the Belgian Trotskyist organisation alongside Abraham Leon and Martin Monath. He twice escaped after being arrested in the course of resistance activities, and survived imprisonment in the German concentration camp at Dora. After the war, he became the youngest member of the Fourth International secretariat, alongside Michel Pablo and others. He gained respect as a prolific journalist with a clear and lively style, as an orthodox Marxist theoretician, and as a talented debater. He wrote for numerous media outlets in the 1940s and 1950s including Het Parool, Le Peuple, l'Observateur and Agence France-Presse. At the height of the Cold War, he publicly defended the merits of Marxism in debates with the social democrat and future Dutch premier Joop den Uyl.

His first wife was Gisela Scholtz (1935—1982), whom he met in 1965. His second wife was Anne Sprimont, whom he met after Gisela Scholtz's death.

== Activity ==
After the 1946 World Congress of the Fourth International, Mandel was elected into the leadership of the International Secretariat of the Fourth International. In line with its policy, he joined the Belgian Socialist Party where he was a leader of a militant socialist tendency, becoming editor of the socialist newspaper La Gauche (and writing for its Flemish sister publication, Links), a member of the economic studies commission of the General Federation of Belgian Labour and an associate of the Belgian syndicalist André Renard. He and his comrades were expelled from the Socialist Party not long after the Belgian general strike of 1960–61 for opposing its coalition with the Christian Democrats and its acceptance of anti-strike legislation.

He was one of the main initiators of the 1963 reunification between the International Secretariat, which he led along with Michel Pablo, Pierre Frank and Livio Maitan, and the majority of the International Committee of the Fourth International, a public faction led by James Cannon's Socialist Workers Party that had withdrawn from the FI in 1953. The regroupment formed the reunified Fourth International (also known as the USFI or USec). Until his death in 1995, Mandel remained the most prominent leader and theoretician of both the USFI and of its Belgian section, the Revolutionary Workers' League.

Until the publication of his massive book Marxist Economic Theory in French in 1962, Mandel's Marxist articles were written mainly under a variety of pseudonyms and his activities as Fourth Internationalist were little known outside the left. After publishing Marxist Economic Theory, Mandel travelled to Cuba and worked closely with Che Guevara on economic planning, after Guevara (who was fluent in French) had read the new book and encouraged Mandel's interventions.

He resumed his university studies and graduated from what is now the École Pratique des Hautes Études in Paris in 1967. Only from 1968 did Mandel become well known as a public figure and Marxist politician, touring student campuses in Europe and America giving talks on socialism, imperialism and revolution.

Although officially barred from West Germany (and several other countries at various times, including the United States, France, Switzerland, and Australia), he gained a PhD from the Free University of Berlin in 1972 (where he taught for some months), published as Late Capitalism, and he subsequently gained a lecturer position at the Free University of Brussels.

Mandel gained mainstream attention in the United States following the rejection of his visa by Attorney General John N. Mitchell against the suggestion of Secretary of State William P. Rogers in 1969. Attorney General Mitchell acted under the Immigration and Nationality Act of 1952 (also known as the McCarran–Walter Act). This act states that those who "advocate the economic, international and governmental doctrines of world Communism" and "who write or public any written or printed matter advocating or teaching the economic international and governmental doctrines of world Communism" can have their visas barred. Mandel had been granted visas in 1962 and 1968 but had violated the conditions of his second visit unknowingly by asking for donations for the defence in the legal cases of French demonstrators. As a result of his rejected visa, a number of American scholars came out to vouch for his right to visit the United States. They attempted to highlight that he did not affiliate with the Communist Party and had publicly spoken out against the invasion of Czechoslovakia in 1968.

In 1971, a Federal Court in New York voted to void Mitchell's decision, stating that the United States could not bar a visitor, but on 29 June 1972, the Supreme Court ruled in Kleindienst v. Mandel, 6 to 3, that Mitchell had acted within his job description in rejecting the visa.

In 1978, he delivered the Alfred Marshall Lectures at the University of Cambridge, on the topic of the long waves of capitalist development.

Mandel campaigned on behalf of numerous dissident left-wing intellectuals suffering political repression, advocated for the cancellation of the Third World debt, and, in the Mikhail Gorbachev era, spearheaded a petition for the rehabilitation of the accused in the Moscow Trials of 1936–1938. When in his seventies, he travelled to Russia to defend his vision of democratic socialism and continued to support the idea of Revolution in the West until his death.

== Writings ==
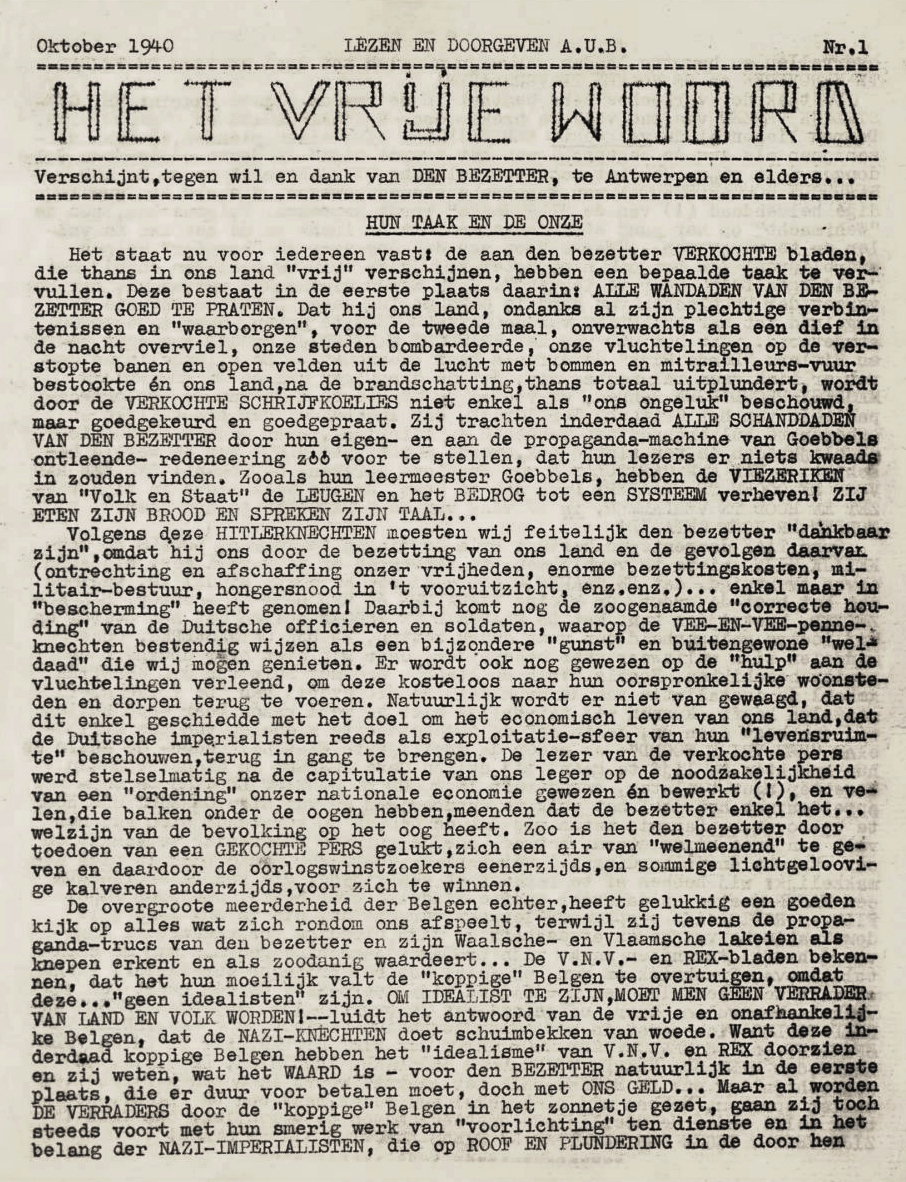
Het Vrije Woord, October 1940

In total, he published approximately 2,000 articles and around 30 books during his life in German, Dutch, French, English and other languages, which were in turn translated into many more languages. During the Second World War, he was one of the editors of the underground newspaper, Het Vrije Woord. In addition, he edited or contributed to many books, maintained a voluminous correspondence, and was booked for speaking engagements worldwide. He considered it his mission to transmit the heritage of classical Marxist thought, deformed by the experience of Stalinism and the Cold War, to a new generation. And to a large extent he did influence a generation of scholars and activists in their understanding of important Marxist concepts. In his writings, perhaps most striking is the tension between creative independent thinking and the desire for a strict adherence to Marxist doctrinal orthodoxy. Due to his commitment to socialist democracy, he has even been characterised as "Luxemburgist".

== Death and legacy ==
Mandel died at his home in Brussels in 1995 after suffering from a heart attack.

Mandel is probably best remembered for being a populariser of basic Marxist ideas, for his books on late capitalism and Long-Wave theory, and for his moral-intellectual leadership in the Trotskyist movement. Despite critics claiming that he was "too soft on Stalinism", Mandel remained a classic rather than a conservative Trotskyist: writing about the Soviet bureaucracy but also why capitalism had not suffered a death agony. His late capitalism was late in the sense of delayed rather than near-death. He still believed though that this system hadn't overcome its tendency to crises. A leading German Marxist, Elmar Altvater, stated that Mandel had done much for the survival of Marxism in the German Federal Republic.

== Bibliography ==
=== Selected bibliography ===
- Traité d'économie marxiste, 1962. (Marxist Economic Theory, trans. Brian Pearce, 1968.)
- Die EWG und die Konkurrenz Europa-Amerika, 1968. (Europe versus America: Contradictions of Imperialism, trans. Martin Rossdale, 1970.)
- La formation de la pensée économique de Karl Marx: de 1843 à la rédaction du "Capital", 1970. (The Formation of the Economic Thought of Karl Marx, 1843 to Capital, trans. Brian Pearce, 1971.)
- Decline of the Dollar: a Marxist view of the Monetary Crisis, 1972 (a collection of articles)
- Der Spätkapitalismus, 1972. (Late Capitalism, trans. Joris de Bres, 1975.)
- "The Driving Forces of Imperialism" Paper submitted to the Bertrand Russell Centenary Symposium, Linz, Austria, 11 to 15 September 1972, published in Spheres of Influence in the Age of Imperialism (Ken Coates, ed, Nottingham 1972)
- La Dialectique de la Croissiance, Mai, November 1972, pp. 7–14; Krisis in de ekonomiese theorie: lezingen en diskussies van het vesvu kongres vu-amsterdam (Nijmegen, 1973), pp. 55–76, VESVU-kongreskommissie (ed.); "The dialectic of growth". International Institute for Research and Education. 16 June 2020.
- Vervreemding en revolutionaire perspectieven, 1973.
- The Marxist Theory of Alienation, 2nd ed, Ernest Mandel & George Novack, 1973
- Why they invaded Czechoslovakia, 1974.
- "Solzhenitsyn, Stalinism and the October Revolution". New Left Review. I (86). New Left Review. July–August 1974.
- "Liebman and Leninism". Socialist Register. 12. Socialist Register. 1975. Review of Marcel Liebman's Leninism Under Lenin
- "Recession and its consequences (discussion)". New Left Review. I (87–88). New Left Review. September–December 1974. Discussion with Bill Warren.
- Introduction au marxisme, 1975. (From class society to communism: an introduction to Marxism, trans. Louisa Sadler, 1977.)
- "The industrial cycle in late capitalism". New Left Review. I (90). New Left Review. March–April 1975.
- La longue marche de la revolution, 1976 (a collection of articles)
- "Revolutionary strategy in Europe—a political interview". New Left Review. I (100). New Left Review. November–December 1976.
- Krise und Aufschwung der kapitalistischen Weltwirtschaft 1974–1977, 1977. (The second slump: a Marxist analysis of recession in the seventies, trans. Jon Rothschild, 1978.)
- "On the nature of the Soviet State". New Left Review. I (108). New Left Review. March–April 1978.
- Critique de l'eurocommunisme, 1978. (From Stalinism to Eurocommunism, trans. Jon Rothschild, 1978.)
- De la Commune à Mai 68: Histoire du mouvement ouvrier international, 1978 (articles)
- Long Waves of Capitalist Development, 1978.
- De la bureaucratie, Editions la Brèche, 1978 ("What is the bureaucracy?". In: Tariq Ali (ed.), The Stalinist Legacy. Harmondsworth: Penguin, 1984, pp. 60–94).
- Revolutionäre Strategien im 20. Jahrhundert : politische Essays, trans. and ed. Gisela Mandel, 1978.
- Revolutionary Marxism Today, ed. by Jon Rothschild, 1979 (based on interviews and discussions)
- Réponse à Louis Althusser et Jean Elleinstein, 1979.
- Trotsky: A Study in the Dynamic of his Thought, 1979.
- Offener Marxismus: ein Gespräch über Dogmen, Orthodoxie und die Häresien der Realität, 1980 (with Johannes Agnoli)
- La crise 1974–1982: les faits, leur interprétation marxiste, 1982.
- "The threat of nuclear war and the struggle for socialism". New Left Review. I (141). New Left Review. September–October 1983.
- Karl Marx: die Aktualität seines Werkes, ed. Willy Boepple, 1984.
- Delightful Murder: A Social History of the Crime Story, 1985.
- The meaning of the Second World War, 1986.
- "The role of the individual in history: the case of World War Two". New Left Review. I (157). New Left Review. May–June 1986.
- "In defense of socialist planning". New Left Review. I (159). New Left Review: 5–37. September–October 1986. Pdf.
- "The myth of market socialism". New Left Review. I (169). New Left Review. May–June 1989.
- Cash Crash & Crisis: Profitboom, Börsenkrach und Wirtschaftskrise, 1989
- Où va l'URSS de Gorbatchev, 1989. (Beyond Perestroika: the future of Gorbachev's USSR, trans. Gus Fagan, 1989.)
- "Willy Brandt and Petra Kelly". New Left Review. I (196). New Left Review. November–December 1992.
- Octobre 1917 – coup d'État ou révolution sociale?, 1992. (October 1917: Coup d'état or Social Revolution?, trans. by Penny Duggan and Steve Bloom, 1992.)
- Trotzki als Alternative, 1992. (Trotsky as Alternative, trans. Gus Fagan, 1992.)
- Kontroversen um "Das Kapital", trans. Alfred Kosing, 1992 (taken from Mandel's introduction to Marx's Capital)
- The Place of Marxism in History, 1994,
- Power and Money: A Marxist Theory of Bureaucracy, 1994.
- Revolutionary Marxism and Social Reality in the 20th Century: Collected Essays, ed. Stephen Bloom, 1994.

=== Books he (co-)edited ===
- 50 Years of World Revolution 1917–1967: an International Symposium, 1968
- Arbeiterkontrolle, Arbeiterräte, Arbeiterselbstverwaltung, 1971
- Ricardo, Marx, Sraffa: the Langston Memorial Volume, 1984
- New Findings in Long-Wave Research, 1992

== See also ==
- Open Marxism

== Sources ==
- Achcar, Gilbert, ed. (2003). Gerechtigkeit und Solidarität. Ernest Mandels Beitrag zum Marxismus. Köln: Neuer isp-Verlag.
- North, David (1997). Ernest Mandel 1923–1995: A Critical Assessment of His Role in the History of the Fourth International. Labour Press Books.
- Stutje, Jan Willem (2007). Ernest Mandel: Rebel tussen Droom en Daad. Antwerpen: Houtekiet/Amsab.

Published in English as: Stutje, Jan Willem (2009). Ernest Mandel: A Rebel's Dream Deferred. Verso. ISBN 9781844673162.

- Ali, Tariq (September–October 1995). "Tariq Ali interviews Ernest Mandel: the luck of a crazy youth". New Left Review. I (213). New Left Review.
- Manuel Kellner: Against Capitalism and Bureaucracy. Ernest Mandel’s Theoretical Contributions (= Historical Materialism Book Series, Volume: 279), Bill, Leiden 2023, ISBN 978-90-04-53349-3.
