= Fourth International (post-reunification) =

Trotskyist international founded in 1963

- Abbreviation: FI, USFI, USec
- Founded: July 1963; 63 years ago
- Preceded by: International Secretariat of the Fourth International (ISFI); International Committee of the Fourth International (ICFI)
- Headquarters: Paris, France
- Newspaper: International Viewpoint; Inprecor
- Ideology: Communism; Trotskyism; Eco-socialism
- Political position: Far-left

Website
- fourth.international

The Fourth International (FI) is a Trotskyist political international that was founded in 1963.

Following a ten-year schism, in 1963 the majorities of the two public factions of the Fourth International, the International Secretariat of the Fourth International (ISFI) and the International Committee of the Fourth International (ICFI) reunited.

In 2003, the United Secretariat was replaced by an Executive Bureau and an International Committee, although some other Trotskyists still refer to the organisation as the USFI or USec.

== History ==
=== Background ===
In the early 1950s the Fourth International suffered a split due to conflicts with members of the international, most notably the American, British, and French sections, in part due to the leadership and views of Michel Pablo. Initially, a meeting was held in October 1953 to set up an internal Faction within the international to oppose revisionism and Pabloism, however following further conflicts between the SWP (US) and the international's leadership, the International Committee of the Fourth International was formed in November 1953 and was then expelled by the International Executive Committee. The group that remained under the leadership of Pablo became referred to as the International Secretariat (IS). The IS held three congresses between 1953 and 1963, while the IC did not hold any.

Discussions about reunification had been attempted shortly after the split, with an attempted establishment of a Parity Commission that failed due to the IC withdrawing from it in November 1955, and another attempt made in 1957 which failed, in Pierre Frank's words, "mainly because distrust on the organizational level persisted".

Some groups on both sides did not support the movement towards reunification. In the run-up to the 1961 congress of the ISFI the supporters of the Argentine Juan Posadas, a leader of the Latin American Secretariat, found themselves in agreement with the supporters of Michel Pablo in stressing the primacy of the anti-colonial revolution: the majority in the ISFI placed a greater emphasis on developing activity in Europe. However, Posadas and Pablo developed different reactions to the split in Stalinism: Posadas tended towards Mao Zedong, while Pablo was closer to Nikita Khrushchev and Josip Broz Tito.

A similar development happened on the ICFI side. By 1961 the ICFI had split politically, the Internationalist Communist Party (PCI) in France and the Socialist Labour League (SLL) in Britain arguing that a workers' state had not been created in Cuba, putting them at odds with the American SWP and the other organisations in the ICFI. By 1963, the split was also organizational. Each side held a congress at which it claimed to be the majority of the ICFI.

A second attempt at creating a Parity Commission was successful and first met in September 1962. Both sides had differing internal opinions, as the majority leadership of the IS pushed hard for unification to occur quickly, while Pablo in the minority was sceptical, and with the IC the majority (including the US SWP) were in favour of a quick reunification process, while the British and French sections wanted an extensive process which included "a thorough discussion of the causes of the original split and a repudiation of "Pabloism" which they felt had been responsible." This led to an organisation split, with the US SWP along with Argentine, Austrian, Canadian, Chinese and Japanese IC sections agreeing to join the reunification congress with the IS. On the other hand, Pierre Lambert's PCI and Gerry Healy's SLL called an "International Conference of Trotskyists" to continue the work of the ICFI under their own leadership.

=== Seventh World Congress: Reunification ===
The June 1963 Reunification Congress was held in Rome.

The "Reunification Congress" has been criticised by Robert J. Alexander as the Trotskyist movement did not reunify into one movement and instead resulted in there being three: the USFI, the Posadist Fourth International and the ICFI. Among ICFI and ISFI groups, only the PCI and the SLL refused to attend. The supporters of Posadas had left in 1962 to form their own international.

It also adopted a strategic resolution drafted by Mandel and Hansen, Dynamics of World Revolution Today which became a touch-stone document for the International over the following decades. It argued that "three main forces of world revolution—the colonial revolution, the political revolution in the degenerated and deformed workers' states, and the proletarian revolution in the imperialist countries—form a dialectical unity. Each force influences the others and receives in return powerful impulses or brakes on its own development." Reflecting on the Cuban Revolution, accomplished without a revolutionary party, is also concluded that "The weakness of the enemy in the backward countries has opened the possibility of coming to power with a blunted instrument." This view was reinforced the following year, through the United Secretariat's resolution On the Character of the Algerian Government drafted by Joseph Hansen.

The Reunification Congress also adopted a resolution on "The Sino-Soviet Conflict and the situation in the USSR and the other workers' states". The resolution noted the declining authority of the Kremlin both inside the Communist parties and with anti-imperialist movements such as those in Cuba and Algeria. It viewed 'de-Stalinisation' as a defensive liberalisation by the bureaucracy. The Sino-Soviet split was viewed as reflecting "the different needs of the bureaucracies headed by the two leaderships (...). The search for agreements and above all an over-all agreement with imperialism on the part of the Soviet bureaucracy contradicts the search by the Chinese leaders for more aid and for better defenses against the heavy pressure of imperialism." Pablo's tendency had drawn more optimistic conclusions about the impact of de-Stalinisation. It presented a counter-resolution, but only won minority support along with some places on the International Executive Committee: it publicly broke with the International a year later, claiming that Pablo had been ousted.

=== After 1963 ===
Lambert's Internationalist Communist Party (PCI) in France and the Socialist Labour League (SLL) in Britain did not take part in the reunification congress, and continued the ICFI banner under their own leadership, opposing key elements in the reunification documents, including the view that the 26th of July Movement had created a workers' state in Cuba. They argued instead that Cuba's revolution did not bring power to the working class; the SLL believed that Cuba had remained a capitalist country. In their view, the International's support for the Cuban and Algerian leaderships reflected a lack of commitment to the building of revolutionary Marxist parties. While not rejecting eventual reunification in principle, the continuing ICFI argued that a deeper political discussion was needed to ensure that "Pablo's errors" were not deepened.

Those within the U.S. Socialist Workers Party (SWP) who broadly shared this view formed a "Revolutionary Tendency" led by Tim Wohlforth and James Robertson in 1962. They argued that the party should have a full discussion of the meaning of Pabloism and the 1953 split. Along with the remainder of the ICFI, they argued that Cuba's revolution did not prove that the Fourth International was no longer necessary in the colonial countries. However, differences inside the Revolutionary Tendency developed. In 1964, with Wohlforth laying the evidentiary basis for claims of "party disloyalty" against Robertson, the tendency was expelled from the party. In the opinion of Robertson's group, Wohlforth conspired with the SWP leadership to get Robertson's group expelled.

The ICFI unsuccessfully repeated its appeal for a deep discussion with the reunified Fourth International ("United Secretariat") at the end of 1963, and on later occasions. Its 1966 conference called for a Fourth International Conference. The ICFI approached the secretariat again in 1970, requesting "a mutual discussion that might open the way to the Socialist Labour League and its French sister organisation, the Organisation Communiste Internationaliste, reunifying with the Fourth International". Similar approaches were rejected in 1973.

A further departure was registered in 1964 when the only mass organisation within the International, the Lanka Sama Samaja Party of Ceylon, was expelled after entering a coalition government in that country. The ISFI had sharply criticised the LSSP's parliamentary tactics in 1960, and the LSSP had been absent from the 1961 congress, but was represented at the 1963 congress by Edmund Samarakkody.

By 1964 the LSSP's leadership abandoned the party's longstanding opposition to the Sri Lanka Freedom Party (SLFP), completing a political turn it had attempted in 1960, until the Sixth World Congress condemned the LSSP for offering support to the SLFP. In 1964, the International also opposed the entrance of the LSSP into a coalition government, with Pierre Frank addressing the LSSP's June 1964 conference to explain the United Secretariat's views. The International severed relations with the LSSP; it supported a split at the LSSP conference, supported by around a quarter of its membership and led by Bala Tampoe, a trade union leader, and 14 members of the LSSP's central committee. Tampoe and other LSSP dissidents organised the Lanka Sama Samaja Party (Revolutionary), which became the Ceylonese section of the International.

=== Eighth World Congress: Anti-imperialist focus ===
At the Eighth World Congress, held in the Taunus Mountains in Germany during December 1965, Samarakkody was also the delegate of a new section in Ceylon, the LSSP (R), formed by an 'orthodox' tendency in the LSSP. Sixty delegates attended the congress, which witnessed a growth in international radicalisation of students and youth. The main resolution on The International Situation and the Tasks of Revolutionary Marxists focussed the sections on solidarity for anti-imperialist struggles, such as that in Vietnam, and intervening into the youth radicalisation and the crisis in international Communism. Other major resolutions were adopted on Africa, Western Europe and the deepening Sino-Soviet split. That congress recognised two sympathising groups in Britain. One, the Revolutionary Socialist League, better known as the Militant tendency, objected to what it regarded as the uncritical way in which the International supported anti-colonial liberation movements and regarded the International's decision to give official recognition to a second, rival group as undemocratic. Its views had deep roots, and the RSL left the International soon after, leaving the International Group as the British section.

In 1965, the International Revolutionary Marxist Tendency (led by Michel Pablo) split from FI; it rejoined in 1992.

=== Ninth World Congress: Vietnam solidarity ===
The International grew substantially in the 1960s, alongside most other left-wing groups. The April 1969 Ninth World Congress in Italy gathered 100 delegates and observers from 30 countries including new sections in Ireland, Luxembourg and Sweden and rebuilt ones in France, Mexico, Spain and Switzerland. It adopted a major resolution on the deepening youth radicalisation. Over the following years its sections continued to grow principally through campaigns in opposition to the war in Vietnam, though the student and youth radicalisation.

In 1964 the current around Argentine Trotskyist Nahuel Moreno fused his followers into the reunified Fourth International, bringing in hundreds of new members from throughout Latin America.

Unification was discussed between the International and the French group Lutte Ouvrière. In 1970, Lutte Ouvrière initiated fusion discussions with the French section, the LCR. After extensive discussions, the two organisations agreed the basis for a fused organisation, but the fusion was not completed. In 1976 discussions between the LCR and Lutte Ouvrière progressed again. The two organisations started to produce a common weekly supplement to their newspapers, common electoral work and other common campaigning.

After the Lambert's current left the ICFI in 1971, its Organising Committee for the Reconstruction of the Fourth International (OCRFI) opened discussion with the International. In May 1973, Lambert's tendency unsuccessfully requested to take part in the discussions for the 1974 congress, but the United Secretariat did not take the letter at face value and asked for clarification. In September 1973 the OCRFI responded positively and the United Secretariat agreed a positive reply. However, in the rush of preparations for the world congress the United Secretariat's letter was not sent, leading Lambert's group to repeat its request in September 1974 through an approach to the US SWP. The following month the secretariat organised a meeting with the OCRFI. However, discussions decelerated after Lambert's Internationalist Communist Organisation made an attack on Ernest Mandel, which it later acknowledged as an error. In 1976 new approaches by the OCRFI met with success, when it wrote with the aim "to strengthen the force of the Fourth International as a single international organisation". However, these discussions decelerated again in 1977 after the Internationalist Communist Organisation leaders stated that it had members inside the Revolutionary Communist League, the International's French section.

The period from 1969 to 1976 was the stormiest because of a faction struggle over the centrality of guerrilla warfare in Latin America and elsewhere. The 1969 congress had adopted a sympathetic approach to the tactics of guerrilla warfare; only one of the International's leaders opposed this approach at that time, Peng Shuzi.

=== Tenth World Congress: Guerrilla debate ===
The Leninist Trotskyist Tendency successfully worked to convince the international majority that it had previously supported guerrilla struggles with a mistaken orientation. In February 1974, votes at the Tenth World Congress divided 45:55 on the question of armed struggle, with a large minority opposing the generalised use of guerrilla tactics in Latin America.

The 1974 congress registered further growth, with organizations from 41 countries. According to Pierre Frank, "About 250 delegates and fraternal delegates participated, representing 48 sections and sympathising organisations from 41 countries. Compared to the previous congress the numerical strength of the Fourth International had increased some tenfold." By the time the eleventh congress arrived, a new level of unity seemed to have developed in the International.

=== Eleventh World Congress: Declining factionalism ===
The years prior to the Eleventh World Congress reflected declining factional heat in the International: no international factions have been declared since then. Michel Pablo's tendency raised the question of unity in 1976, with an ambitious proposal that it and the International could eventually unify in a new organisation comprising tendencies that were, or were evolving towards, revolutionary Marxism. The secretariat felt unable to move ahead with the proposal. Pablo's tendency finally rejoined in 1995.

Two currents with roots in Gerry Healy's ICFI also came towards the International at this time: the Workers' Socialist League in Britain and the Socialist League in Australia both opened discussions in 1976. Both currents would eventually merge with the sections of the International in their countries; the Socialist League merging in 1977, while the majority of the Workers' Socialist League became the Socialist Group, which was to attend the ninth world congress and eventually join in 1987.

Resolutions on the world situation, Latin America, women's liberation and Western Europe were adopted by overwhelming percentages. The world congress agreed that the sections should execute a turn to industry. The Eleventh World Congress, held in November 1979, gathered 200 delegates from 48 countries. It registered further growth above all in Spain, Mexico, Colombia and in France. The congress also opened a discussion on the place of pluralism in Socialist Democracy, which was to continue until 1985. It also invited contributions from the Workers' Socialist League in Britain, developing a relationship which led to WSL's successor organisation joining the International in 1987.

The most contested debate at the congress was on the Nicaraguan revolution. Two views developed inside the United Secretariat, but both supported the FSLN and argued for the building of a section of the International inside the FSLN. This approach was disputed by the tendency of Nahuel Moreno.

Moreno and supporters split from USEC in 1979. They initially wanted to merge with the Organising Committee for the Reconstruction of the Fourth International led by Pierre Lambert, before creating the International Workers League – Fourth International after negotiations failed.

=== Later Congresses ===
Since 1979, the Fourth International has held seven world congresses.

- 12th Congress: 1985
- 13th Congress: February 1991
- 14th Congress: June 1995
- 15th Congress: February 2003 in Belgium
- 16th Congress: February 2010 in West Flanders
  - The sixteenth World Congress was the subject of a one-hour documentary by Julien Terrie. The film include interviews with participants from the NPA (France), Latit (Mauritius), the MST (Argentina), Dosta (Bosnia and Herzegovina), the PSOL (Brasil), the Labour Party (Pakistan), Kokkino (Greece) and elsewhere.
- 17th Congress: February 2018
- 18th Congress: 23 to 28 February 2025 in Belgium.

== Impact ==
The International today supports several activities which support the work of progressive activists and organizations around the world. Many of them trace their roots to the 1981-1983 period when the Pathfinder tendency broke with Trotskyism.

- The International Institute for Research and Education was founded in June 1981, opening the following year in Amsterdam. According to a book reviewing the first 30 years of the Institute. "It fulfilled a plan by Jacob Moneta, the editor-in-chief of the important big German trade union journal Metall, the Belgian Marxist economist Ernest Mandel, the Swiss economist Charles-André Udry and the philologist Jan Philipp Reemtsma." No.41 Living our Internationalism: The first 30 years of the IIRE | IIRE
- The International Viewpoint magazine was established in January 1982 to replace Intercontinental Press, which for a brief period had been the common English-language publication of the Fourth International having merged with the English-language Inprecor of the 1970s.
- The first International Revolutionary Youth Camp was held in July 1983, celebrating its 25th anniversary in the youth camp of Fourth International (2008). On average, around 600 activists gather for a self-managed camp organised by national delegations of anti-capitalist youth organisations. The camp has been held in several Schengen Area countries, including Belgium, Denmark, France, Germany, Greece, Italy, Portugal, Spain, and Sweden.

== Participants ==
The Fourth International includes the participating organisations below.

| Country | Party/Organization | Ref |
|---|---|---|
| Algeria | Parti socialiste des travailleurs | |
| Argentina | Democracia Socialista | |
| Argentina | Marabunta | |
| Austria | Sozialistische Alternative (SOAL) | |
| Bangladesh | Communist Party of Bangladesh (Marxist–Leninist) | |
| Belgium | Gauche anticapitaliste/SAP Antikapitalisten | |
| Brazil | Ação Popular Socialista | |
| Brazil | Centelhas | |
| Brazil | Ecossocialiastas - Brazil | |
| Brazil | Movimento Esquerda Socialista | |
| Brazil | Subverta | |
| (United Kingdom) Britain | Anti*Capitalist Resistance (ACR) | |
| (United Kingdom) Britain | ecosocialist.scot | |
| Canada | Gauche Socialiste | |
| Canada | New Socialist Group | |
| Colombia | Movimiento Ecosocialista | |
| Corsica | A Manca | |
| Croatia | Radnička borba | |
| Denmark | Socialist Workers Party, part of Red–Green Alliance | |
| Ecuador | Red Feminista Ecosocialista | |
| France | Ensemble! | |
| France | Gauche Ecosocialiste | |
| France | Nouveau Parti Anticapitaliste - l'Anticapitaliste | |
| France | Nouveau Parti Anticapitaliste - Révolutionnaires | |
| Germany | International Socialist Organisation | |
| Greece | TPT - Fourth International Programmatic Tendency | |
| Greece | Organization of Communist Internationalists of Greece–Spartacus | |
| Hong Kong | Pioneer | |
| India | Revolutionary Communist Party of India | |
| Indonesia | Perempuan Mahardhika | |
| Ireland | Revolutionary Internationalist Socialist Environmentalist | |
| Italy | Communia Network | |
| Italy | Rete Quarta | |
| Italy | Sinistra Anticapitalista | |
| Japan | Japan Revolutionary Communist League | |
| Japan | National Council of Internationalist Workers | |
| Kashmir | Jammu Kashmir Awami (Peoples Worker Party) | |
| Kashmir | Jammu Kashmir Awami Workers' Party | |
| Mexico | Coordinadora Socialista Revolucionaria | |
| Mexico | Indomitas | |
| Mexico | Movimiento Socialista del Poder Popular | |
| Mexico | Workers' Revolutionary Party | |
| Morocco | al Mounadila socialiste | |
| Netherlands | Socialist Alternative Politics | |
| Netherlands Antilles | Groupe révolution socialiste | |
| Norway | Forbundet Internasjonalen | |
| Pakistan | Pakistan Section of Fourth International | |
| Panama | Movimiento Alternativa Socialista | |
| Peru | Corrente Súmate | |
| Philippines | Rebulosyonaryong Partido Ng Manggagawa – Mindanao (RPM-M) | |
| Portugal | Left Bloc | |
| Portugal | Rede Anticapitalista | |
| Portugal | Toupeira Vermelha | |
| Puerto Rico | Democracia Socialista | |
| Russia | Russian Socialist Movement | |
| Spain | Anticapitalistas | |
| Catalonia | Anticapitalistas | |
| Sri Lanka | Socialist People Forum | |
| South Africa | Amandla! | |
| Sweden | Socialist Politics | |
| Switzerland | Movement for Socialism | |
| Switzerland | Solidarity | |
| Turkey | Sosyalist Demokrasi için Yeniyol | |
| Ukraine | Sotsialnyi Rukh | |
| United States | Reform & Revolution | |
| United States | Solidarity | |
| United States | Tempest | |
| Venezuela | Luchas | |

== See also ==
- International Viewpoint
- Inprecor
- List of Trotskyist internationals
- List of Trotskyist organizations by country
