= Hassan Hanafi =

Egyptian professor of philosophy (1935–2021)

Hassan Hanafi (Arabic: حسن حنفي; 23 February 1935 – 21 October 2021) was a professor and chaired the philosophy department at Cairo University. He was a leading authority on modern Islam.

As a young man motivated by a revolutionary political activism, Hanafi associated with the Muslim Brotherhood. Later Hanafi studied at the Sorbonne in Paris. From 1967, he was a professor of philosophy in Cairo, as well as a visiting professor at universities in France, the United States, Belgium, Kuwait and Germany. He has been categorized as among "the big names" of the post-1967 Arab intellectual tradition.

== Early life ==
Hanafi was born into an artistic family in Cairo, Egypt. In his youth he studied the violin, which he continued to play later in his life.

== Career ==
Hanafi was a professor of religion at Temple University in the early 1970s. During this time, he was also a contributor to the Philadelphia-based Arabic newspaper 'Arrayh' founded in 1974.

== Philosophy ==
Hanafi was a disciple of the phenomenologist Osman Amin, and published a trilogy in which he used Husserl's methods to reconstruct classic Islamic philosophy and to critique the sources and development of European consciousness.

Hanafi's interpretation of Islam has been described as socialist and he elaborated on the concept of an "Islamic Left", interpreting Islam in a socialist manner, or else a "third way." He promoted an interpretation of Islam supporting the development of a global ethics. In his later works Hanafi argued that Islam needed to be understood in way that facilitates human freedom and progress. As summarized by scholar Mohammed Hashas:

"...some of the renowned defenders of socialism for Arab nationhood would become leading scholars of what has come to be known as the 'Islamic left', a concept that first appeared in the first issue of the Islamic Left Magazine, 1981, by the philosopher Hassan Hanafi (b. 1935), as part of his project 'the third way' of reading the tradition and modernity, a way that is neither fully Euro-modern nor fully Islamico-traditionalist; it is implicitly secular-mundane, since it reads the sacred in the light of the sociopolitical needs of people; it is creed revolutionized to be lived (mina-lʻaqīda ilā thawra), as one of the volumes of the project is entitled" (2018, 271).

Hanafi acted as an adviser to the InterAction Council, a coalition of 26 former prime ministers and presidents. He was also a member of the Association for Intercultural Philosophy, which encourages a dialogue among philosophers from all over the world. He was one of the original signatories of A Common Word Between Us and You, an open letter by Islamic scholars to Christian leaders, calling for peace and understanding.

Hanafi is also remembered for his published scholarly debates with contemporary philosopher Mohammed Abed al-Jabri.

He won a number of academic awards during his lifetime.

== Controversy over his apostasy ==
Hanafi's book "An Invitation for Dialogue" was accused by conservative Islamic scholars as heresy and apostasy.

His liberal opinions about Islam infuriated conservative Islamic scholars and the staff of the al-Azhar University. For example, he stated that the name of God should be changed to "Transcendence". Conservative scholars from al-Azhar refuted that Hanafi was distorting Islam. A fatwa was issued that condemned Hanafi as an apostate. This raised controversy in Egypt, as many liberals disagreed with the charge that Hanafi was an apostate.

== Legacy ==
In an Egyptian magazine he declared that his main disciples in Egypt are Nasr Abu Zayd, Ali Mabrouk, and Kareem Essayyad.

The scholar Carool Kersten notes that Hanafi's intellectual influence extends beyond majority Arabic-speaking countries and includes Indonesia, where among the local intelligentsia, Hanafi represented "a particular brand of Arab intellectuals known as turāthiyyūn—‘heritage thinkers’."

== Death ==
Hannafi died on 21 October 2021, aged 86.

== Select bibliography ==
- al-yasār al-islāmī wal-waḥda l-wataniyya [The Islamic Left and National Unity] (Cairo: N.H., 1981).
- al-yamīn wal-yasār fī al- fiqr addīnī [The Right and the Left in Religious Thought] (Damascus: ḍar allaa addin, 1996).
- Contemporary issues, (Cairo, 1977)
- Religious dialogue and revolution (Cairo, 1977).
- Tradition and modernism, Arab Center for Research and Publication, (Cairo: Arab Center for Research and Publication, 1977)
- "The relevance of the Islamic alternative in Egypt" Arab Studies Quarterly 4, 54–74. 1982.
- Qadhāyā Mu'āshirat Fi'Fikrina Al-Mu'āshir (Beirut: Dārut-Tanwīr lith-Thibā'atin-Nasyr, 1983).
- Ad-Dîn Wat-Tsaurah Fi Mishr, 1952-1981 (Cairo, 1987).
- Min Al-'Aqīdah Ilā Al-Thawrah: Al-Muqaddimāt Al-Nazariyyah [From Dogma to revolution] (Cairo, 1989).
- Theosophy and phenomenology: Islamic studies (Cairo, 1989).
- East-West dialogue (with Al-Jabiri) (Cairo, 1991).
- Generations dialogue, (Cairo: Dar Keba, 1998)
- From transfer to creativity (Cairo: Dar Keba, 2001).
- "From Orientalism to Occidentalism', Encounters in Language and Literature 1(2), 7-16. 2012.
- "'As-Salafiyyāt Wa Al-'Ilmāniyyāt Fi Fikrina Al-Mu'āshir', Al-Azminat 3(15), 15–47. 2016.

== See also ==
- Mahmoud Mohammed Taha
- Nasr Hamid Abu Zayd
- Mohammed Abed al-Jabri
- Mohammed Arkoun
