= Islamo-leftism =

Supposed proximity between left-wing politics and Islamism

Islamo-leftism is a neologism designating a supposed proximity and laxity of certain left-wing ideologies, personalities or parties towards political Islam or militant Islamism. It was coined by Pierre-André Taguieff in 2002, before being subsequently taken up by various media, intellectual, academic or political personalities. The relevance of the term is contested in particular by its instrumentalization and its stigmatizing aspect similar to "Judeo-Bolshevism". Several scholars have described it as a feature of French right-wing media rhetoric that seeks to link leftist academics with militant Islamist movements.

== History ==
=== Origins ===
Essays in Libération and France 24 on the history of this term do not claim to find the definitive origin of this term. Rather, both publications trace the term to Pierre-Andre Taguieff's 2002 book entitled New Judeophobia. Taguieff describes Islamo-fascism as a type of anti-Zionism popular among the new third-worldist, neo-communist and neo-leftist configuration, better known as the 'anti-globalization movement'. Interviewed in 2016 by Liberation journalists Sonya Faure and Frantz Durupt, Taguieff was uncertain whether he coined it or had heard it used, and points out that the phrases "Islamo-progressives" and, in the 1980s, "Palestino-progressives" were used as self-descriptions by the French left. It is a neologism applied by individuals to the political alliance between leftists and Islamists.

According to Alain Badiou and Éric Hazan, Islamo-leftists was coined by French police for reasons of simple utility. Al Jazeera claims that the term Islamo-leftism was coined by Marine Le Pen, who uses it to describe what she considers an unhealthy alliance between Islamist fanatics and the French Left.

French philosopher Pascal Bruckner has said that Islamo-leftism was chiefly conceived by British Trotskyites of the Socialist Workers Party (SWP). Understanding the term as the fusion between the atheist Far Left and religious radicalism, Bruckner posited that because those Trotskyites perceive Islam's potential for fomenting societal unrest, they promote tactical, temporary alliances with reactionary Muslim parties. According to Bruckner, leftist adherents of Third-Worldism hope to use Islamism as a battering-ram to bring about the downfall of free-market capitalism and see the sacrifice of individual rights, in particular of women's rights, as an acceptable trade-off in service of the greater goal of destroying capitalism. Bruckner contends that Islamists, for their part, pretend to join the left in its opposition to racism, neocolonialism and globalization as a tactical and temporary means to achieve their true goal of imposing the totalitarian theocracy of Islamist government. The Libération essay on the origins of the term said that several commentators linked the origins of the term to former SWP Central Committee member Chris Harman and to the foundation of the Respect Party and George Galloway.

A similar term, "Islamo-Marxists" was used by the regime of the Shah of Iran in 1978, which claimed that an alliance supposedly existed between the network of exiled cleric Ruhollah Khomeini and the Communist Tudeh Party of Iran. Most notoriously, the Shah's regime had initially blamed Islamic Marxists for the December 1978 Cinema Rex Fire in Tehran, one of the causes of the 1979 Iranian Revolution.

=== Growth ===
The term first began entering mainstream discourse in France in the debate over the French law on secularity and conspicuous religious symbols in schools in 2003 and 2004. Le Monde used the term for the first time in print in September 2004.

According to research led by David Chavalarias of the French National Centre for Scientific Research, the term was used in 0,032% of Twitter posts about French politics between 2017 and 2020, with a significant spike beginning in 2019, after ministers in the Castex government began using the term in official statements. The research found that term was most often used in hostilities between political communities and was often associated with terms such as "traitor," "enemy of the Republic," and "shame". The research further found that the term was particularly aimed against left-wing groups in France and was most often used by accounts associated with the far-right and by accounts that had been suspended by Twitter.

==== 2021 proposed Vidal inquiry ====
In February 2021, French Minister of Higher Education, Research and Innovation Frédérique Vidal stated that Islamo-leftism was plaguing society and announced that she would formally ask the National Centre for Scientific Research (CNRS) to lead an inquiry to examine whether it and post-colonialism were interfering with academic research in France.

Vidal's announcement was met with significant controversy. The Conférence des présidents d'université called the term a "pseudo-notion" lacking a rigorous definition and stated it was shocked at "the launch of another sterile debate." Over 600 academic professors and researchers signed an open letter in Le Monde denouncing the inquiry, saying that Vidal was "defaming a profession and a community which, as Minister for Higher Education, she is supposed to be protecting" and saying that inquiry was reminiscent of the "anti-gender movement" and other attempts to suppress research into colonialism and racism, such as in Poland, Hungary, and Brazil. In an editorial, Le Monde accused the government of "attacking academic freedom and of trying to create a distraction from its handling of the COVID-19 pandemic in France". The CNRS itself said that the concept "does not correspond to any scientific reality" and denounced "those would use it to attack academic freedom."

Within the French cabinet, opinions were divided, with government spokesperson Gabriel Attal saying that if the phenomenon exists, it's "extremely marginal," and with coalition partner François Bayrou saying that "in the universities that I know, that's not what's happening." On the other hand, Minister of National Education Jean-Michel Blanquer said that it was an undeniable social fact and Minister of the Interior Gérald Darmanin said that it would disregarding the truth to pretend that universities, public services, and associations haven't been affected by Islamism backed by the left. Five days after making the announcement, Vidal said that "of course, the term doesn't have a scientific definition, but it corresponds to what a lot of our fellow citizens are feeling and to a certain number of facts," and defended the inquiry, saying that there is a need to take stock of the situation in the country.

=== Islamo-leftism in Iran ===
Shireen Hunter credits Mahmoud Taleghani's reinterpretation of Islam in the light of Marxist theory in the 1970s with inspiring the group Organization of Struggle for the Emancipation of the Working Class. The result she says was the radicalization of Islamic discourse and the emergence of what she describes as a 'Leftist Islam'. According to Olivier Roy, the three major Iranian political groups—leftist, Islamist and Islamo-leftist—active in the 1970s had revolutionary rather than liberal democratic ideologies.

Since the Iranian Revolution, the Islamic Left and the Islamic Right have been the main political factions of the Islamic Republic of Iran. Many figures within the Islamic Left have become Islamic liberal Reformists since the 1990s; some refer to Reformists as Islamic Left.

== Usage ==
French New Philosopher Bernard-Henri Lévy has described Islamo-leftism as a "grand new alliance between the reds, greens and the new browns".

Writing in 2010 for the thinktank of the European People's Party, Maurice Fraser of LSE's European Institute, listed "what is dubbed in the UK 'Islamo-leftism'" as a "curious ideological bedfellow... spawned by" the recent abdication of the Enlightenment project of human rights, freedom, secularism, science and progress on the part of much of the non-mainstream left.

According to Mark Silinsky of the United States Army War College, Islamo-leftism is alliance of Islamists and leftists in opposition to Western values that can also be referred to as the red-green-brown axis. Silinsky characterizes the black-green alliance between Black Lives Matter and the Council on American–Islamic Relations as an example of Islamo-leftism.

Alvin Hirsch Rosenfeld describes Islamo-leftism as the hope, entertained by a revolutionary fringe, of seeing Islam become the spearhead of a new insurrection, engaged in a jihad against global capitalism.

According to Robert S. Wistrich, "[a] poisonous anti-Jewish legacy can be found in Marx, Fourier, and Proudhon, extending through the orthodox Communists and non-conformist Trotskyists to the Islamo-Leftist hybrids of today who systematically vilify the so-called racist essence of the Jewish State".

Writing in 2022 for the Hudson Institute, Lorenzo G. Vidino argues that the alliance between some Islamists and some on the left (exemplified by the UK's Stop the War Coalition) is built upon their shared commitment to anti-colonialism, anti-Americanism and anti-Zionism.

== Analysis ==
Writing for the Berkley Center for Religion, Peace, and World Affairs, human rights lawyer Yasser Louati called the term "a testimony to how the center of gravity of French politics has shifted toward the far-right" and that the "controversy around Islamo-leftism and the subsequent witch hunt express another not so admissible opinion: that universities are there to legitimize the status quo, not to question it." Sébastien Ledoux of Paris 1 Panthéon-Sorbonne University has said that the term has been "hijacked by right-wing journalists and intellectuals to denounce a part of the left that, in their eyes, had fallen into the trap of multiculturalism by questioning national unity and national values." Political sociologist Audrey Célistine of the University of Lille has called the term "a form of McCarthyism."

University College London professor of French politics Philippe Marlière compared the term to the antisemitic canard Jewish Bolshevism, stating that "no one has ever been able to define exactly what an 'islamo-leftist' is" and that research on intersectionality was "unpalatable to the government which upholds the view that there is no structural sexism and racism in France, or nothing to discuss about France's colonial past." Anthropologist Didier Fassin has said that use of the term "revealed an improbable convergence between Macron's En Marche and Le Pen's Rassemblement National, on the one hand, and a reactionary segment of France's intellectual world on the other" and that "a remarkable feature of this movement is its disregard for the international literature nourishing these new ideas. Instead of understanding them, it appears more interested in caricaturing them."

French sociologist and philosopher Raphael Liogier has said that "left-wing intellectuals have long deserted this fascination [of alliances with Islamist]" and that "paradoxically, it is at the moment when this doesn't fascinate anyone on the left, in academia or elsewhere that they are accused of Islamo-leftism. This is suspect, bizarre and incoherent." Reza Zia-Ebrahimi of King's College London has said that understanding the origins of the concept "is crucial in highlighting the deep resonance of Islamophobia denial with the New Philosophers' decades-old offensive against the left" and "that the New Philosophers have thrown their weight behind Islamophobia denial is significant in light of the jaw-dropping extent of their air time on radio and television, the sheer number of publications they author, their enormous influence on the French political and media elite and (not to be underestimated) their international standing."

Russell P. Johnson of the University of Chicago Divinity School has said that "as many Americans' perspectives shifted in the 1990s from seeing communism as the United States' main antagonist to seeing militant Islamism (and often, by extension, Islam) as the United States' main antagonist, some people interpreted have Islam on analogy with communism, refusing to acknowledge evidence to the contrary." He also described it as "a bogeyman of French right-wing media talk" that seeks to link leftist academics with militant Islamist movements.

== See also ==
- Islamic left (disambiguation)
- Jewish Bolshevism
- Islamofascism
- New antisemitism
- Political religion
- Red-green-brown alliance
- Regressive left
- RESIST (electoral list)
- Progressive Muslim vote
