= Carool Kersten =

Dutch scholar of Islam (born 1964)

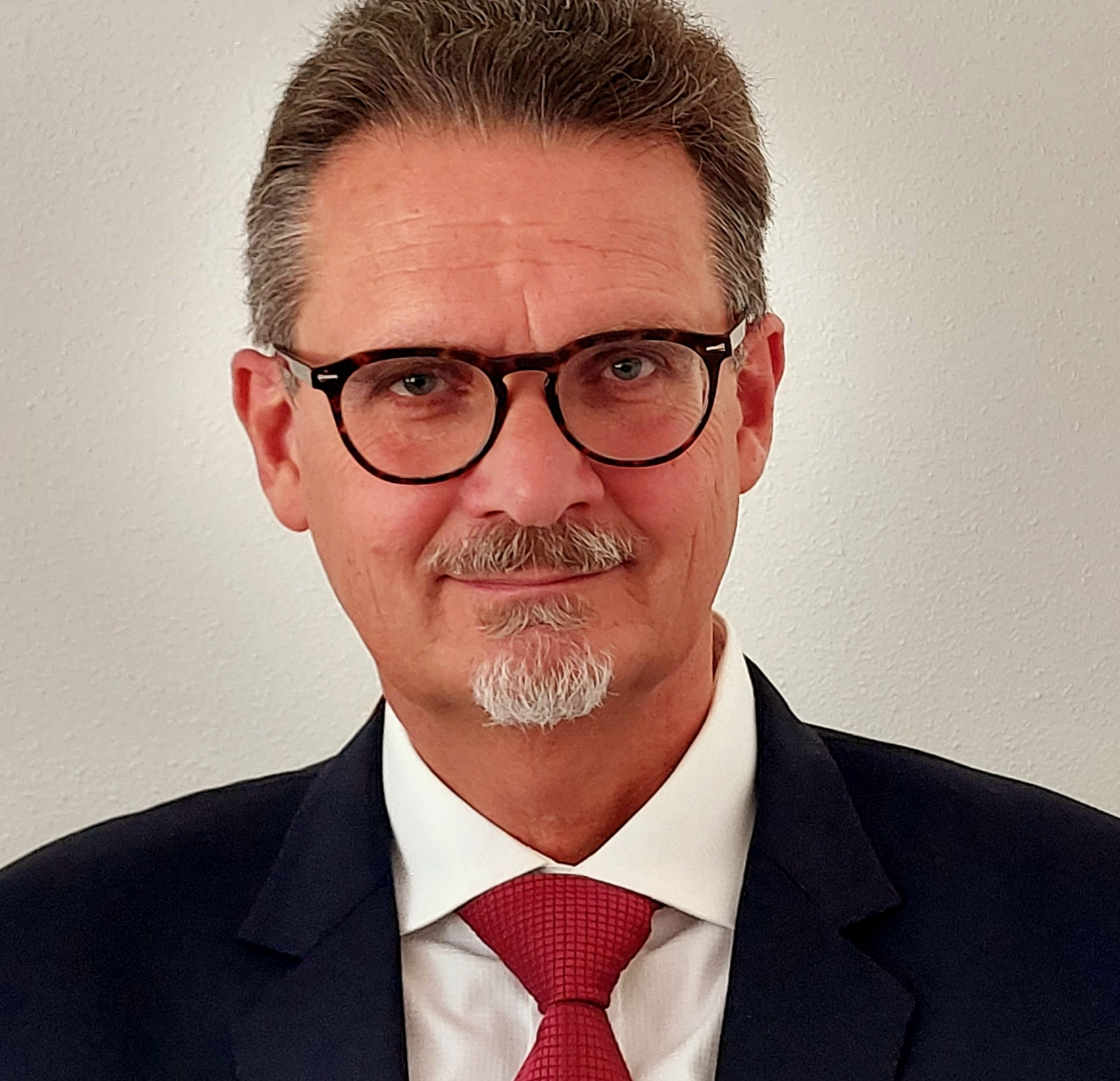

Carool Kersten (Haelen, 28 June 1964) is a Dutch scholar of Islam. Trained as an Arabist, Southeast Asianist and scholar of Religions, he currently is Professor of Islamic Studies at the Catholic University Leuven in Belgium and Emeritus Reader in the Study of Islam & the Muslim World at King's College London. In addition, he is also a Senior Research Fellow at the Institute for Philosophical and Religious Studies of the Science & Research Center in Koper (Slovenia). His research interests focus on the modern and contemporary Muslim world, in particular intellectual and political developments in both regional and global contexts, as well as on theory and method in the study of Islam as a field of scholarly inquiry.

== Education ==
Carool Kersten studied Arabic and Middle Eastern Studies at the then still existing Institute for Languages and Cultures of the Middle East at Radboud University Nijmegen in the Netherlands. He specialized in modern Middle Eastern and Islamic studies, with minors in International Law, International Relations and Indonesian. Upon completion of a dissertation on the theory and practice of the Islamic law of treaties, in 1987, he was awarded the academic title of doctorandus (equivalent to an MA) in Arabic Language and Culture with cum laude distinction. He then went to Egypt, where he attended the International Language Institute in Cairo. In 1988, he was admitted as a Sworn Translator by the Netherlands District Court in Arnhem. He returned to Nijmegen during a sabbatical (1995-1996) to do graduate work in philosophy. Taking another sabbatical year in 2001, he studied at Payap University in Chiang Mai, Thailand, where he obtained a Certificate in Thai and Southeast Asian studies. In 2005, he moved to England in order to conduct postgraduate research at the School of Oriental and African Studies (SOAS) and was awarded a PhD in the Study of Religions in 2009. In his thesis, written under the supervision of Professor Christopher Shackle and entitled 'Occupants of the Third Space: New Muslim Intellectuals and the Study of Islam', he dealt with the work of three contemporary Muslim scholars, (Nurcholish Madjid, Hasan Hanafi, Mohammed Arkoun).

== Career ==
Except for a sabbatical pretty year (1995–96), from 1988 until 2003, Carool Kersten worked for the Dutch construction and engineering company Ballast Nedam Group. In 1989 he was transferred to the Kingdom of Saudi Arabia to provide support for the company's operations in the Middle East, where he held a number of staff and project positions, including that of personnel and general services manager for the company's Middle East operations (1996–2000). After leaving Saudi Arabia in late 2000, he was retained as a consultant and translator until 2003. From 2002 until 2007, Kersten taught Asian history and religions at the Center for International and Graduate Studies (now known as the Institute of South East Asian Studies, SEAIGS) of Payap University in Chiang Mai, Thailand. Subsequently, he held appointments in the Department of Theology & Religious Studies and the Institute of Middle Eastern Studies at King's College London (2007-2022) as Lecturer, Senior Lecturer and Reader (Associate Professor) in the Study of Islam & the Muslim World. In July 2022, he was appointed Research Professor (BOFZAP) in Islamic Studies at the Faculty of Theology & Religious Studies of the Catholic University of Leuven (KULeuven). In recognition and appreciation of his services to the university and to his academic field, effective 2 July 2022, King's College London conferred on him the title of Emeritus Reader in the Study of Islam and the Muslim world.

== Other activities ==
Carool Kersten is the founding editor of the book series Contemporary Thought in the Islamic World, which was published by Routledge ever since 2011, and also a Fellow of the Higher Education Academy (HEA). He also is a founding member of the British Association for Islamic Studies, serving as a BRAIS Council Member from 2014 to 2020 and sitting on its advisory board (2014-2024). In October 2014, he was elected as a Research Associate of the Institute for Philosophical and Religious Studies at the Science & Research Centre Koper in Slovenia, and promoted to Senior Research Associate in November 2020. In that same year he also joined the Scholarly Network for Philosophy in the Modern Islamic World, hosted by the Free University Berlin. Kersten makes regular media appearances as an analyst and commentator on developments in the Muslim world. For this he was awarded the King's Award for Media Personality of the Year 2015.

== Publications ==
- Islam and Contemporary European Literature (Edinburgh University Press, 2025)
- Contemporary Thought in the Muslim World: Trends, Themes, and Issues (Routledge, 2019)
- The Fatwa As an Islamic Legal Instrument: Concept, Historical Role, Contemporary Relevance (Gerlach Press, 2018)
- The Poesis of Peace: Narratives, Cultures and Philosophies (Routledge, 2017), with Klaus-Gerd Giesen and Lenart Skof
- A History of Islam in Indonesia: Unity in Diversity (Edinburgh University Press, 2017). Indonesian translation: Mengislamkan Indonesia: Sejarah Peradaban Islam di Nusantara (Penerbit Baca, 2018)
- Islam in Indonesia: The Contest for Society, Ideas and Values (Hurst and Oxford University Press, 2015). Indonesian Translation: Berebut Wacana: Pergulatan Wacana Umat Islam Indonesia Era Reformasi (Mizan, 2018).
- The Caliphate and Islamic Statehood (Gerlach Press, 2015)
- Alternative Islamic Discourses and Religious Authority (Routledge, 2013), with Susanne Olsson
- Demystifying the Caliphate (Hurst and Oxford University Press, 2013), with Madawi al-Rasheed and Marat Shterin
- Cosmopolitans and Heretics (Hurst and Oxford University Press, 2011)
- Dr Muller's Asian-Journey: Thailand, Cambodia, Vietnam and Yunnan (White Lotus Press 2004)
- Strange Events in the Kingdoms of Cambodia and Laos(White Lotus Press, 2003)

Kersten also has contributed dozens of chapters, articles and reviews to edited volumes and academic journals. Between 2008 and 2020 he maintained a blog on alternative Islamic discourses under the title Critical Muslims, and used to contribute book and music reviews for the 'Rambles.net' website.
