= Center for Religious Studies in the name of Hieromartyr Irenaeus of Lyons =

Russian anticult organization

- Native name: Центр религиоведческих исследований во имя священномученика Иринея Лионского
- Type: NGO
- Founded: 1993
- Founder: Alexander Dvorkin
- Website: https://iriney.ru/

The Center for Religious Studies in the name of Hieromartyr Irenaeus of Lyons is a Russian non-profit nongovernmental anti-sectarian organization engaged in research and information and consulting work on the activities of new religious movements and sects of a destructive and totalitarian nature. The Center was established in 1993 with the blessing of Patriarch Alexy II of Moscow and All Russia and has been headed by Alexander Dvorkin since its founding. The Center is the nucleus of the Russian Association of Centers for the Study of Religions and Sects (RACIRS).

== History ==
The organization was founded by A. L. Dvorkin in 1993 with the blessing of Holy Patriarch of Moscow and all Russia Alexy II in 1993 as the Information and Consulting Center named after the Holy Martyr Irenaeus, Bishop of Lyon for the purpose of collecting, processing and disseminating generalized reliable information about the teachings and activities of new religious movements Totalitarian and destructive oriented.

Since 2003, the Center has had its current name.

In 2006, the Center became the umbrella organization of the Russian Association of Centers for the Study of Religions and Sects..

The Center is also a member of European Federation of Centres of Research and Information on Sectarianism.

On October 9, 2009, the Center celebrated its 15th anniversary during the Second St. Irenei Readings, receiving congratulations from hierarchs and figures of the Russian Orthodox Church.

On October 28, 2011, the Center received a state grant of 2.5 million rubles to help people affected by totalitarian sects.

== Activities ==
The Center is engaged in research, information and consulting, lecturing and publishing activities. The Center maintains contact with media and state law enforcement agencies and Christian anti-sectarian organizations in Russia and abroad.

In 1995, the Center published a brochure by Alexander Dvorkin entitled "Ten Questions for the Compulsive Stranger, or a Manual for Those Who Don't Want to Be Recruited," which became the subject of a lawsuit in the Khoroshyov Inter-Municipal District Court of the Northwestern District of Moscow..

Until 2006, the center published an informational and educational magazine, Przrenie, which covered the activities of totalitarian sects and destructive cults.

- compilations of analytical and informational materials on sectarianism in general, as well as on the recent activities of sects;
- Narratives-witness accounts of former sect members;
- details about the actions of sect apologists in Russia and other countries;
- important interviews with theologians, doctors, journalists, pastors, politicians, and scientists.

The Center's website has an entire section devoted to the activities of psychosects and the harm they cause.

== Reviews ==
=== Positives ===
In 2000 candidate of historical sciences, researcher of Institute of Ethnology and Anthropology of RAS A. A. Ozhiganova noted:

But at present Russia lacks large interdisciplinary information and analytical centers for the study of new religious movements that exist in all Western countries, such as INFORM (UK), Dialog Center International (Denmark), CESNUR (Italy) and others. Attempts to create such centers are undertaken in Russia within the framework of the Russian Orthodox Church: it is the Center of St. Irenei Lyonsky led by A. Dvorkin in Moscow, the Orthodox Institute of Missiology, Ecumenism and New Religious Movements at Russian Christian Humanitarian Academy in St. Petersburg.

In 2009, V. N. Chaikin, a candidate of sociological sciences, classified the center's activity as "preventive-educational, which consists of providing information about sects and cults" and noted that "the main task of the Information and Consulting Center of St. Irenei of Lyons is to spread reliable information about the teaching and activity of totalitarian sects and destructive cults" and also noted that "for this purpose, according to the official information on the center's website, the staff are engaged in research, conscientious objectionable and unbiased work..

=== Critical ===
In 1998 the librarian F. Rekovskaya in the abstract journal "Social Sciences and Humanities. Отечественная и зарубежная литература» характеризует Центр Иринея Лионского в качестве «ведущего российского подразделения международной антикультистской сети (официального подразделения Московского Патриархата)».

In 2000 the sociologist of religion Marat Shterin, formerly as an expert witness for the plaintiffs in the trial against A.L. Dvorkin, noted that the Information and Consultative Center of the Holy Martyr Irenaeus of Lyons (ICCIL) is an "anti-cult group" that significantly influenced "the formation of both the ideology of the ACD and the type of ideas about NRD that the Russian public received". In his opinion, the connection of the ICCIL with the ROC and some Western anti-cult groups (Dialogue Center in Orhus (Denmark) and Berlin) were the reasons that "facilitated the legitimization" of Dvorkin's approach, which is "extremely negative and overgeneralized". According to Shterin, in the course of its activities, the ICCIL received from the Dialogue Center "selectively selected negative material about 'sects'".

In 2006, the religious scholar Igor Kanterov wrote a scriptum for students of Religious Studies "New religious movements: (introduction to basic concepts and terms)" that "In 2005, the Information and Consulting Center of St. Irenei Lyonsky changes its name and becomes the Institute for Religious Studies Research. The appearance of this "Institute" is nothing more than a simple change of signboard for a well-known sect-fighting institution. As time has shown, the views of the head and staff of the Institute have nothing to do with religious studies; as before, they work in the field of sectarianism.

In 2007 lawyer, co-chairman of the Slavic Legal Center Vladimir Ryakhovsky in a publicist article on Portal-Credo.ru, recalling conflict with Ecclesiastes and Golden Ring, wrote that the Center for Religious Studies of St. Irenaeus of Lyons "in essence ... is an extremely destructive sect, which, based on lies, promotes enmity to a number of officially law-abiding religious associations operating in Russia."

In 2008, the religious scholar D. A. Golovushkin wrote in his textbook for students of pedagogical colleges "Religious Studies" that

The center sees its task as "disseminating reliable information about the teachings and activities of totalitarian sects and destructive cults. To this end, employees of the center are engaged in research, consulting, lecturing and publishing activities, as well as liaising with state structures and mass media". However, these activities are often of an emotionally offensive nature, accompanied by high-profile court proceedings.

== Notable Employees ==
- Alexander Dvorkin (President) - Doctor of Philosophy in history, Candidate of Theology, Professor of the Department of Missiology Missionary faculty of PSTGU Chairman Expert Council for the State Religious Expertise under the Ministry of Justice of the Russian Federation
- protoiereus Lev Semyonov (executive secretary) - candidate of historical sciences, Docent of the theory and history of culture department of the historical faculty of Tver State University, senior researcher of the research laboratory for comprehensive study of Romanticism Tver State University Member of the Russian Association of Anticology under Russian Academy of Sciences, member of the Expert Council for conducting the state religious expertise under the Ministry of Justice of the Russian Federation.
- Priest Mikhail Plotnikov (vice president) - candidate of Theology, associate professor at the Department of Religious Studies of the Missionary Faculty of PTSU.
- Eugene Mukhtarov - Journalist, member of the Expert Council for State Religious Expertise under the Ministry of Justice of the Russian Federation.
- Alexander Kuzmin - religious scholar, candidate of Philosophy, member of the Expert Council for State Religious Expertise under the Ministry of Justice of the Russian Federation.

== See also ==
- Criticism of modern paganism
