= Islamic left =

The Islamic left is a combination of Islam and left-wing politics, and may refer to:

- Islamic liberalism
- Islamic socialism
- Islamo-leftism
- Khomeinist Left, called "Islamic Left" in Iran
- Progressive Muslim vote

== See also ==
- Iranian reformists – Islamic left political faction
- Christian left
- Regressive left
