= Anarchism: From Theory to Practice =

1965 French-language political tract by Daniel Guérin

- First edition (publ. Gallimard)
- Author: Daniel Guérin
- Original title: L'Anarchisme : de la doctrine à l'action
- Subject: Anarchism
- Genre: Philosophy, Politics
- Published: 1965
- Publisher: Monthly Review Press
- English publication date: 1970
- Pages: 166 pages, paperback
- ISBN: 0-85345-175-3

Anarchism: From Theory to Practice is a book by Daniel Guérin noted as a "definitional tract in the 'ABCs' of anarchism". First published in French in 1965, the 1970 English translation is Guérin's best-known work, describing the intellectual substance and actual practice of anarchism. The English translation by Mary Klopper includes a foreword by Noam Chomsky, who describes it as an attempt "to extract from the history of libertarian thought a living, evolving tradition".
