= Alexander Dvorkin =

Russian professor and religious activist

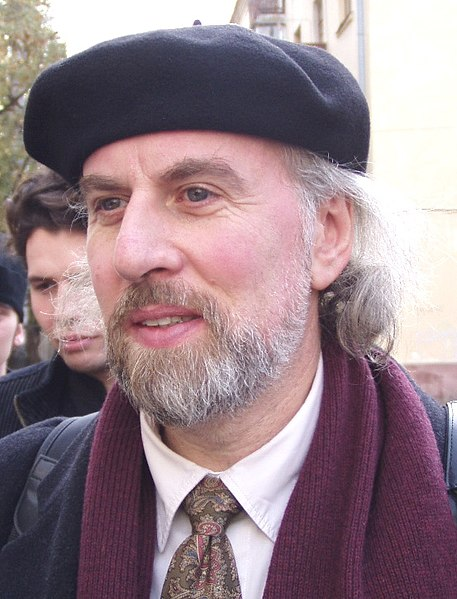
- Born: 20 August 1955 (age 71); Moscow, USSR
- Education: Hunter College BA Russian literature (1980); Saint Vladimir's Orthodox Theological Seminary M.Div. Theology (1983); Fordham University Ph.D. Medieval studies (1988)

Alexander Leonidovich Dvorkin (Russian: Алекса́ндр Леони́дович Дво́ркин; born 20 August 1955 in Moscow) is a Russian anti-cult activist. From 1999 to 2012 he was professor and head of the department of the study of new religious movements (cults) at Saint Tikhon's Orthodox University. He is currently professor of department of missiology at that university.

== Education ==
Dvorkin received his secondary education at schools No. 25, 91 and 112 in Moscow. After graduation from school grade 10, in 1972, he became a student in the Faculty of Russian Language and Literature of Moscow Pedagogical Institute. During his studies he joined the hippy movement. Dvorkin sets out two completely different versions of why he never graduated from the institute.

- According to Dvorkin's book Teachers and Lessons: Memories, Stories, Reflections (Russian: "Учителя и уроки: воспоминания, рассказы, размышления"), together with the like-minded people, he prepared a work that was demonstrated on 20 September 1975 at an exhibition of avant-garde artists in one of the pavilions of the VDNKh; about this work and its authors – a group of hippies called "Hair", to which Dvorkin was close – American magazine Time responded positively. Consequently, in Fall 1975, Dvorkin was expelled from the third year of the institute "for believers incompatible with those that should be in the future Soviet teacher".
- According to Dvorkin's book My America (Russian: "Моя Америка"), he was not admitted to the fifth examination session and was expelled from the institute for poor academic performance and non-attendance in early 1975. Remembering the exhibitions, he does not name them among the reasons for exclusion.

On 6 March 1977 Dvorkin emigrated from the USSR on an Israeli visa. He did not go to Israel, but went to the United States. He worked as a courier, waiter, copyist.

In 1978, Dvorkin became a student at Hunter College, where he continued to study Russian literature. Dvorkin was baptized on 19 January 1980 in Christ the Savior Church, a New York parish of the Orthodox Church in America. Dvorkin graduated with a Bachelor of Arts in Russian Literature from Hunter College in 1980. The same year, he became a student of Saint Vladimir's Orthodox Theological Seminary in Crestwood, New York, graduating with a Master of Divinity in theology in 1983 with thesis titled "Life, personality and ideas of Sergius Stragorodsky, Bishop of Yamburgh and Archbishop of Vyborgh and Finland (later patriarch of Moscow and all Russia) before 1917". In 1984, Dvorkin received American citizenship. In 1984, he enrolled in doctoral studies at the Department of Medieval History at the Jesuit-affiliated independent school – Fordham University. Dvorkin graduated with a Ph.D. in Medieval studies in 1988 with a dissertation titled "Ivan the Terrible as a Religious Type". His mentor was John Meyendorff.

== Early career ==
In late 1988, Dvorkin moved to Washington, D.C., where he worked at the bureau of the Voice of America radio station. At the same time, he became the subdeacon and altar server of Bishop Vasily Rodzianko in the Washington St. Nicholas Cathedral. In 1991, Dvorkin moved to Germany and started working as an editor for Radio Liberty in Munich. Dvorkin's time in America, as well as his reasons for leaving and returning to Russia, are not fully accounted for, fueling rumors about Dvorkin's true allegiances.

== Anti-cult activism ==
Dvorkin returned to Russia on 31 December 1991. In March 1992, he started working in the Synodal Department of Religious Education and Catechesis. At this work Dvorkin encountered some new religious movements, primarily the "Mother of God center", a homegrown Russian sect. In 1993, Dvorkin coined the term "totalitarian sect," which would become the catch-all label for new religious movements. The term "totalitarian" played on fears of return to Soviet-era repressions. Dvorkin called Hitler along with Lenin "founders of the most evil totalitarian sects".

In 1993, Dvorkin founded the first Russian anti-cult organization: Saint Irenaeus of Lyons Information and Advisory Center (Информационно-консультационный центр св. Иринея Лионского) with the blessing of the Patriarch of Moscow, Patriarch Alexy II and became its head. Through this center, Dvorkin adapted the Western anti-cult movement to the Russian situation, making his target small organizations, few of whom had any serious presence in Soviet times, and which were easy to marginalize. Many of these organizations have already become targets for Western anti-cultists. Until the Russian Orthodox Church dropped into the opposition with the more mainstream Christian denominations, center personnel tried to cooperate with them. Despite the fact that the center was created under the umbrella of the Russian Orthodox Church, it portrayed superficial secularism, which allowed it to influence both the orthodox and secular audiences. Through the center conferences were organized, brochures were published, and a website was maintained. Dvorkin himself gave lectures and numerous interviews to various media. His role was so great that the anti-cult movement in Russia had been largely defined by him; he was called "the enemy number one of religious extremists". In 2003, the center was renamed the Saint Irenaeus of Lyons Center for Religious Studies (Центр религиоведческих исследований во имя священномученика Иринея Лионского), with Dvorkin as its president. The center works with Christian countercult organizations in Russia and abroad, being the head center of the Russian Association of Centers for the Study of Religions and Sects. From 2009 to 2021, Dvorkin was vice-president of the European Federation of Centres of Research and Information on Sectarianism (FECRIS), an umbrella organization for anti-cult groups in Europe. After being kicked out from FECRIS he stated that it is "run by cowards and racists." Dvorkin was on the board of FECRIS. Dvorkin has been extremely active in opposing cults and new religious movements through his publications.

Between 1999 and 2012, he was professor and head of the department of the study of new religious movements (сектоведения) at Saint Tikhon's Orthodox University, Moscow, Russia. He is currently a professor in the department of missiology (миссиологии) at the same university.

Dvorkin is a critic of Scientology, which he regards as a dangerous cult. Church of Scientology-affiliated organizations describe him as an "anti-religious extremist", and compile negative information about him on their websites. In 1997, Scientology and several other new religious movements sued Dvorkin and the Russian Orthodox Church for defamation, but their case was dismissed. According to Yuri Savenko, the President of the Independent Psychiatric Association of Russia, Dvorkin has claimed that the followers of Nikolai Rerikh as well as Jehovah's Witnesses, Scientology, Hare Krishnas, Neo-Pagans, Neo-Pentecostals, and many others are "totalitarian cults". In May 2008, Dvorkin attended a Sino-Russian Forum on sect studies in Beijing, and in an interview with Xinhua he said that "Falun Gong practitioners feel they do not belong to any country and act entirely in accordance with Li [Hongzhi]'s will. The cult even gained support from other international cults and from the governments and parliaments of some western countries." And that cults "turn individuals into tools of cults, and destroy their families... Cults make no contribution to the society. But they kept absorbing human resources and wealth from it.... Like cancerous cells, they obtain nutrition from the healthy body of society until it collapses." He also attacked the "Bhagavad-Gita" as an “extremist” book and stated that "We won’t be mistaken if we say that, from the Orthodox viewpoint, Krishna is one of the demons." In addition, as for the prophet of Islam, Dvorkin claimed that "either Mohammed suffered from a disease and it was a delirium vision; or it was a demonic obsession; or, once again, the Byzantine fathers claim that he was a sort of fantasizer who made it all up and then, which he hadn’t expected, his relatives believed in it. But of course, the combinations of all the three are possible as well."

The 2009 annual report of the United States Commission on International Religious Freedom describes Dvorkin as "Russia‘s most prominent 'anti-cult' activist" who "lacks academic credentials as a religion specialist". The American government claimed in 2018 that "Dvorkin is one of a large network of radical Russian Orthodox activists who have grown considerably in influence over the last 10 years due to the Russian government's increasing patronage of the Russian Orthodox Church and the [Russian] government's Soviet-era paranoia about the subversive potential of independent religious groups."

On 12 April 2016, the University of Prešov awarded Dvorkin an honorary doctorate in theology partly in "appreciation of his work in the academic, religious, social, political and cultural fields, but also [as] an emphasis and concrete manifestation of scientific, social and cultural cooperation by the community of Prešov University in Prešov".

He has appeared numerous times on Russian television and many times on television in various Eastern-European countries.

He has written 15 books (on various cults, on church history as well as autobiographies) and was editor-compiler of a further four. He is the author of about 800 articles in 17 languages. He is the author of articles about new religious movements in Great Russian Encyclopedia and Orthodox Encyclopedia.

== Bibliography ==
=== Church history and theology ===
- Dvorkin A. Ivan the Terrible as a Religious Type: a study of the background, genesis and development of the theocratic idea of the first Russian tsar, and his attempts to establish "free autocracy" in Russia. — Erlangen: Erlangen University Press: Oikonomia:Lehrstuhl für Geschichte und Theologie des christlichen Ostens, 1992. — ISBN 3-923119-31-3. (in Russian: Дворкин А. Л. Иван Грозный как религиозный тип: ст. и материалы Archived 17 February 2008 at the Wayback Machine / пер. с англ. Ю. С. Терентьев, А. Л. Дворкин. — Н. Новгород: Изд-во Братства во имя Св. Александра Невского, 2005. — 343 с. — ISBN 5-88213-069-7.)
- Дворкин А. Л. Роль византийско-арагонского тайного союза в подготовке "сицилийской вечерни" [XIII в.] // Альфа и Омега. — М., 1994. — No. 2. — С. 83–100.
- Дворкин А. Л. Идея вселенской теократии в поздней Византии // Альфа и Омега. — М., 1994. — No. 1. — С. 57–72.
- Дворкин А. Л. Современные Православные Церкви (справка) // Альфа и Омега. — М., 1994. — No. 1. — С. 108–115.
- Дворкин А. Л. Роль византийско-арагонского тайного союза в подготовке «сицилийской вечерни» // Альфа и Омега. — М., 1994. — No. 2. — С. 83–100.
- Дворкин А. Л. Ветхий Завет как христианская книга в писаниях св. Иустина, Философа и Мученика // Альфа и Омега. — М., 1994. — No. 3. — С. 75–85.
- Дворкин А. Л. Об отце Глебе Каледе // Альфа и Омега. — М., 1995. — No. 4. — С. 126–134.
- Дворкин А. Л. Миссионер: (Жизнь, личность и взгляды Патриарха Сергия (Страгородского): Главы из канд. дис.) // Альфа и Омега. — М., 1995. — No. 5. — С. 139–156.
- Дворкин А. Л. Корни христианства (Из материалов к учебному курсу «История Церкви») // Альфа и Омега. — 1996. — No. 8. — С. 208–223.
- Дворкин А. Л. Из истории Вселенских Соборов: (Материалы к учебному курсу "История Церкви"): I Вселенский Собор в Никее; Арианские споры // Альфа и Омега. — М., 1996. — No. 2/03 (09/10). — С. 379–408.
- Дворкин А. Л. Из истории Вселенских Соборов: (Материалы к учебному курсу "История Церкви"): III Вселенский Собор; Разбойничий собор; Халкидонский собор // Альфа и Омега. — М., 1996. — No. 4 (11). — С. 240–275.
- Дворкин А. Л. Из истории Вселенских Соборов: (Материалы к учебному курсу "История Церкви"): Эпоха императора Юстиниана и V Вселенский Собор // Альфа и Омега. — М., 1997. — No. 1 (12). — С. 342–372.
- Дворкин А. Л. Из истории Вселенских Соборов: (Материалы к учебному курсу "История Церкви"): Моноэнергизм, монофелитизм и VI Вселенский Собор // Альфа и Омега. — М., 1997. — No. 2 (13). — С. 340–361.
- Дворкин А. Л. Из истории Вселенских Соборов: (Материалы к учебному курсу "История Церкви"): Юстиниан и Пято-Шестой Собор // Альфа и Омега. — М., 1997. — No. 3 (14). — С. 335–350.
- Дворкин А. Л. Размышления об историческом развитии христологической доктрины Армянской Церкви // Труды Ежегодной богословской конференция ПСТБИ. — М., 1997. — С. 16–22.
- Дворкин А. Л. Из истории Вселенских Соборов: (Материалы к учебному курсу "История Церкви"): Первый период иконоборчества и VII Вселенский Собор; Второй период иконоборчества // Альфа и Омега. — М., 1998. — No. 1 (15). — С. 346–375.
- Дворкин А. Л. Из истории Вселенских Соборов: (Материалы к учебному курсу "История Церкви"): Эпоха патриарха Фотия. Миссия святых Кирилла и Мефодия. Крещение Болгарии. Великий Собор примирения // Альфа и Омега. — М., 1998. — No. 3 (17). — С. 335–350.
- Дворкин А. Л. Памяти отца Иоанна Мейендорфа // Альфа и Омега. — 2002. — Вып. 34. — No. 4.
- Дворкин А. Л. Хиастическая структура Евангелия от Иоанна: гипотеза Герхарда и Эллиса // Труды ежегодной богословской конференция ПСТГУ. — М., 2005. — С. 135–139.
- Дворкин А. Л. Очерки по истории Вселенской Православной Церкви. Курс лекций. — Изд. 3-е, перераб. и доп. — Н. Новгород, 2006. — 936 с. — ISBN 5-88213-068-9.
- Дворкин А. Л. Булгаков и Достоевский: Некоторые соображения о генезисе образа Иешуа Га-Ноцри из "Мастера и Маргариты" // Труды ежегодной богословской конференция ПСТГУ. — М., 2007. — С. С.135-139.
- Дворкин А. Л., Малков П. Ю. Мейендорф Archived 5 November 2019 at the Wayback Machine // Большая Российская энциклопедия: в 30 т. / науч.-ред. совет: пред. Ю. С. Осипов и др.. — М.: Большая Российская энциклопедия, 2012. — Т. 19 Маниковский — Меотида. — С. 594–595. — 767 с. — 60 000 экз. — ISBN 978-5-85270-353-8.

=== NRM and cults ===
- Dvorkin, A. The Armageddon in Kiev: Tragedy or Farce? // Update and Dialog. — 1994. — Вып. May. — No. 4.
- Dvorkin, A. A Presentation on the Situation in Russia: Scientology in Russia. // Spirituality in East & West. — 1998. — No. 11.
- Дворкин А. Л. Введение в сектоведение. — Н. Новгород, 1998. — 457 с. — ISBN 5-88213-029-8.
- Дворкин А. Л. «Общество сознания Кришны» как ньюэйджевская секта: (На примере использования его идеологами христианских образов и концепций) // Труды ежегодной богословской конференция ПСТБИ. — М., 1999. — С. 47–56.
- Дворкин А. Л. «Общество сознания Кришны» как секта «Нью Эйдж» // Альфа и Омега. — М., 1999. — No. 20. — С. 251–261.
- Дворкин А. Л. О некоторых подходах к методологии православного сектоведения // Труды ежегодной богословской конференция ПСТБИ. — М., 2000. — С. 65–83.
- Дворкин А. Л. Сектоведение. Тоталитарные секты. Опыт систематического исследования. — Изд. 3-е, пераб. и доп. — Н. Новгород: «Христианская библиотека», 2007. — 813 с. — ISBN 5-88213-068-9.
- Дворкин А. Л. Международное общество сознания Кришны Archived 5 November 2019 at the Wayback Machine // Большая Российская энциклопедия: в 30 т. / науч.-ред. совет: пред. Ю. С. Осипов и др.. — М.: Большая Российская энциклопедия, 2012. — Т. 19 Маниковский — Меотида. — С. 541. — 767 с. — 60 000 экз. — ISBN 978-5-85270-353-8.
- Дворкин А. Л., Силантьев Р. А. Новые религиозные движения Archived 5 November 2019 at the Wayback Machine // Большая Российская энциклопедия: в 30 т. / науч.-ред. совет: пред. Ю. С. Осипов и др.. — М.: Большая Российская энциклопедия, 2013. — Т. 23: Николай Кузанский — Океан. — С. 244. — 766 с. — 26 000 экз. — ISBN 5-85270-320-6.
- Дворкин А. Л. «Белое братство» // Православная энциклопедия. — М. : Церковно-научный центр «Православная энциклопедия», 2002. — Т. IV. — С. 540–542. — 752 с. — 39 000 экз. — ISBN 5-89572-009-9.
- Дворкин А. Л. Богородичный центр // Православная энциклопедия. — М. : Церковно-научный центр «Православная энциклопедия», 2002. — Т. V. — С. 512–513. — 752 с. — 39 000 экз. — ISBN 5-89572-010-2.
- Семёнов Л. Е., Дворкин А. Л. Иеговы свидетели // Православная энциклопедия. — М. : Церковно-научный центр «Православная энциклопедия», 2009. — Т. XXI. — С. 186–188. — 752 с. — 39 000 экз. — ISBN 978-5-89572-038-7.

=== Translations ===
- Хопко Фома, прот. Основы православия. — Glen Cove: Religious Books for Russia, 1987, 1989; Минск: Полифакт, 1991. пер. А. Л. Дворкин
- Мейендорф Иоанн, протопр. Жизнь, достойная восхищения [Памяти протопр. А. Д. Шмемана] / пер.: Дворкин А. Л. // «Альфа и Омега», No. 3, 1994, с. 123–132.
