= René Lefeuvre =

French politician

René Lefeuvre (20 August 1902, Livré-sur-Changeon, Ille-et-Vilaine – 3 July 1988, Paris) was a French Luxemburgist.

As an anti-Stalinist Marxist influenced by Rosa Luxemburg, he joined the Democratic Communist Circle (Cercle Communiste Démocratique) led by Boris Souvarine. He later joined the "Revolutionary Left" tendency within the Section française de l'Internationale ouvrière. In 1938, the tendency was expelled and created the Workers and Peasants' Socialist Party.

He founded the Éditions Spartacus, and was an editor from 1936 until his death in 1988. He published works by Rosa Luxemburg, Victor Serge, Karl Marx, Anton Pannekoek, Daniel Guérin, Alain Guillerm, Paul Mattick, and others.
