= Marceau Pivert =

French trade unionist

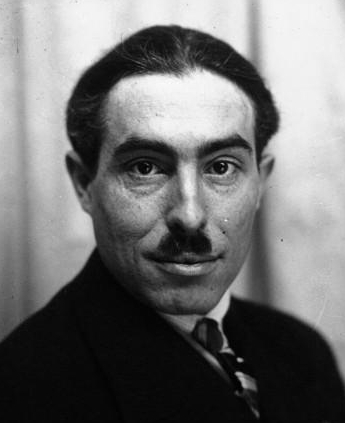
Marceau Pivert in 1933

Marceau Pivert (French: [maʁso pivɛʁ]; 2 October 1895, Montmachoux, Seine-et-Marne – 3 June 1958, Paris) was a French schoolteacher, trade unionist, socialist militant, and journalist. He was an alumnus of the École normale supérieure de Saint-Cloud.

== SFIO ==
Active in the Syndicat National des Instituteurs (SNI), a staunch supporter of laïcité and a pacifist after service in World War I, Pivert joined the faction of the French Section of the Workers' International (SFIO) led by Léon Blum, which opposed affiliation to the Comintern in 1920, as opposed to the new French Communist Party (PCF).

In the early 1930s, Pivert organised the most left-wing members of the SFIO in his Gauche Révolutionnaire ("Revolutionary Left") tendency of which Daniel Guérin was a member. The tendency opened itself to Trotskyism, initiating entryism as a tactic for the latter.

In 1936, when Blum formed the Popular Front government, he was pressured by Pivert to reject capitalism. With spontaneous strikes occurring around the country, Blum refused to allow for revolutionary conditions to arise. Pivert then wrote his best-known article, published on 27 May, headlined Tout est possible! ("Everything Is Possible"), alluding to a social revolution (but never to a socialist one). However, he was opposed by the communist press organ L'Humanité (the PCF was a backer of the Blum government). The communist editorial read: Non! Tout n'est pas possible! ("No! Everything Is Not Possible!"). In consequence, Pivert cut his links with the government, writing to Blum, "I will not accept capitulation in front of Capitalism and the banks".

== Workers and Peasants' Socialist Party ==
The Gauche révolutionnaire left the SFIO to establish the Workers and Peasants' Socialist Party (Parti Socialiste Ouvrier et Paysan or PSOP), awkwardly between socialists and Stalinism. In fact, its ideology fluctuated from Marxist orthodoxy to a radical version of reformism. The PSOP was part of the International Revolutionary Marxist Centre. In 1940, it was outlawed after the fall of France to Nazi Germany, on orders of Vichy French leader Philippe Pétain.

Pivert exiled himself to Mexico and supported the French Resistance. Back in France after World War II, he saw the PSOP divided between some, who joined the PCF, and others, like him, who joined the SFIO.

== Return to SFIO ==
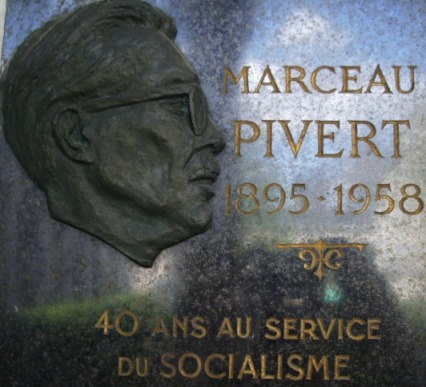
Funeral plaque of Marceau Pivert

He became more moderate inside the SFIO, and his audience was curtailed. Pivert was regularly elected to the party leadership but was for Algeria's independence and against the European Defence Community, both against the line taken by the majority of the party. He rebelled against the party further after taking part in a delegation that visited the Soviet Union and so was voted out of his position in the party leadership. According to some, Pivert would have joined the new Parti Socialiste Autonome (PSA) created by Édouard Depreux and Alain Savary, but he died before the new party split from the SFIO. However, most of his followers in the SFIO entered the PSA later in 1958.
