= Progressive Muslim vote =

Political demographic in the western world

The progressive Muslim vote refers to the support that the majority of Muslims make in the West for electoral options of the political left. Different demographic and statistical studies have shown a consistent tendency for Muslims in Western countries to vote for progressive parties, usually social democrats, socialists or social liberals. This is despite the fact that some Western Muslims tend to be socially conservative, and thus opposed to certain issues often supported by the left such as LGBT rights and abortion. This phenomenon has been analysed by different scholars and academics.

== Analysis ==
For some scholars, despite the differences on cultural and moral issues with the left, and the secularism normally associated with it, Muslims as voters are attracted to progressive parties for different reasons:

- In international politics; progressive governments tend to be closer to Muslim interests such as the Palestinian position in the Israeli–Palestinian conflict, and opposition to interventions in the Middle East such as the Iraq War.
- The left is often more critical to Zionism, with some left movements being openly anti-Zionist.
- Most Western Muslims have immigrant heritage, and left and centre-left parties tend to be friendlier to immigrants and support more permissive migration policies.
- The right-wing, especially the far-right but also in some cases the centre-right, have expressed anti-Islamic or Islamophobic positions, or are close to a base of ultra-conservative Christians hostile to Islam, which has alienated Muslim voters who do not have more choice than opting for parties opposed to them on the other side of the spectrum.
- The existence of Islamic socialism and that the ideas and principles of Islam are close to socialism or progressive socioeconomic positions, so many Muslims, whilst differing with the cultural liberalism of the left, agree with their economic ideas.

Rafaela Dancygier from Princeton University mentions that the majority of Muslims in Europe are small business owners and micro-entrepreneurs who would not necessarily agree with left-wing policies such as tax increases and the welfare state, so would normally be akin to conservative center-right parties; the fact that they are not demonstrates the failure of the center-right to attract the Muslim voter out of fear of alienating its Christian base.

Jonathan Lawrence of Boston College, on the other hand, argues that the left's association with Muslims is natural, since in the West, the majority of Muslims are working-class and of low socioeconomic status, and that workers' parties have recognised this.

Nevertheless, as Lawrence points out, this progressivism is paradoxical and does not extend to their views on politics in the Islamic world itself. Although the majority of voters in the Turkish and Tunisian diaspora supported progressive parties in their countries of residence when they cast their vote, in the elections in Turkey and Tunisia, they mostly supported conservative parties such as Recep Tayyip Erdoğan's Justice and Development Party in Turkey and the Tunisian Ennahda party respectively.

== By region ==
=== North America ===
==== United States ====
In the United States, the majority of Muslims vote for the Democratic Party. As of 2026, the only Muslim representatives in the United States Congress are from the Democratic Party. While Republican Mehmet Oz of Pennsylvania became the first Muslim Senate candidate to be nominated by either party in 2022, the first elected Muslim Senator is Democratic candidate Abdul El-Sayed of Michigan. As of 2026, notable Muslim U.S. representatives have included Keith Ellison, André Carson, Ilhan Omar, Rashida Tlaib, Lateefah Simon, Darializa Avila Chevalier, Adam Hamawy and Aisha Wahab. In 2025, Zohran Mamdani became the first South Asian and Muslim to be elected as Mayor of New York.

===== Shift towards the Democratic party, 2000–2020 =====
The distribution between Democrats and Republicans among the non-black Muslim community in the United States used to be more even, with 50% of Muslims defining themselves as conservative and 30% as liberals. According to the Council on American-Islamic Relations, or CAIR, 78 percent of Muslims who voted in the 2000 presidential election voted for George W. Bush. According to other surveys conducted after the 2000 US presidential election, more than 70 percent of Muslims voted for Bush, and most of the 50,000 Muslim votes in Florida went to the Republican candidate. Muslims were once seen as a "natural" Republican constituency.

This changed after the September 11 attacks, with the subsequent policies of George W. Bush in the "war on terror", particularly the Iraq War, being unpopular among Muslims, with only 7% of American Muslims voting for Bush in 2004. The majority of Muslims then voted for Barack Obama in 2008 and 2012, and for Hillary Clinton in 2016. By 2018 only 10% of Muslims voted for the Republican Party, despite the party being more socially conservative.

According to initial exit polls, around 69% of Muslims supported Democrat Joe Biden in 2020, although it was a slight decrease from the 82% who supported Hillary Clinton four years prior, despite the fact that many of President Donald Trump's measures were unpopular with Muslims, such as the ban on the entry of immigrants from seven Muslim-majority countries and the recognition of Jerusalem as the capital of Israel. According to a survey conducted by ISPU, most Muslims that voted for Trump identified as White (which until recently was what Arabs fell under in the United States census) and exhibited anti-Muslim sentiment as readily as non-Muslim Trump supporters. More extensive surveys later conducted by YouGov/CCES showed that nearly 84% of Muslims voted for Biden in 2020. Another survey conducted by Emgage/Muslim Public Affairs Council similarly showed a majority of Muslim voters (86%) backing Biden in the 2020 election.

===== Impact of the Gaza war on the 2024 elections =====
During the Gaza war, some leaders of the Muslim American and Arab American communities in Michigan including Abandon Biden Campaign chair Samraa Luqman and Listen to Michigan spokesperson Abbas Alawieh urged their communities to withhold their support for President Biden's re-election campaign during the 2024 Michigan Democratic presidential primary to protest the Biden Administration's perceived support for Israel and lack of support for a ceasefire in the Gaza Strip. Palestinian American Congresswoman Rashida Tlaib has endorsed the Listen to Michigan campaign. According to the 2020 United States Census, Middle Eastern and North African peoples make up 3.1% of Michigan's population. Michigan has one of the highest concentrations of Muslims in the United States. The Biden campaign has sought to build a broad coalition of support during the lead-up to the 2024 United States presidential election. Due to the efforts of the Listen to Michigan group, over 100,000 voters had voted uncommitted during the Michigan Democratic primary by 28 February 2024. In Dearborn (which has significant Muslim and Arab communities), uncommitted votes accounted for 57% of votes.

In mid-May 2024, a poll conducted by the Arab-American Anti-Discrimination Committee and The Truth Project found that 25% of Arab American voters planned to vote for Green Party of the United States presidential candidate Jill Stein, 23% were uncommitted, 20% for Cornel West, 7% for Biden, 2% for Trump and that 3% were not planning to vote. The Community Pulse poll surveyed 36,139 Arab American and allied voters. On October 7, 2024, the Abandon Harris campaign endorsed Stein in opposition to the Biden Administration's handling of the Gaza war.

In response to growing discontent within the Arab and Muslim communities, the Harris campaign and running mate Tim Walz have worked with Democratic Muslim voter group Emgage Action to engage with Arab and Muslim community leaders and disaffected voters. In addition, a group called Arab Americans for Harris-Walz was launched in early October 2024 following a meeting between the National Security Advisor to the Vice President Philip H. Gordon and Muslim, Arab and Palestinian community leaders. The Biden Administration also met with Lebanese American leaders to discuss evacuating US citizens from Lebanon following the 2024 Israeli invasion of Lebanon.

In 2024, ABC News and Voice of America reported that while polling showed that most Arab and Muslim American voters favored the Democratic Party, there was a slight increase in Arab and Muslim support for Trump and the Republicans between 2020 and 2024. These segments cited Trump's stewardship of the American economy during the COVID-19 pandemic, opposition to abortion, gay marriage and LGBTQ-inclusive policies as factors for supporting the Republican Party. Due to the Republican Party's pro-Israel stance during the Gaza war, this support had decreased. On October 26, Republican presidential candidate Trump courted Muslim voters while campaigning in Michigan by promising to end hostilities in the Middle East. Trump was accompanied by several Michigan Muslim leaders including Imam Belal Alzuhair, who described him as a "peace candidate" who would "end war in the Middle East and Ukraine." During his 2024 presidential campaign, Trump had previously courted Jewish American voters by criticizing the Biden Administration's alleged "inadequate" support for Israel and repeatedly urged to Israel “finish the job” and destroy Hamas.

===== 2025–2026 elections =====
During the 2025 New York mayoral election, Zohran Mamdani became the first South Asian and Muslim to be elected as Mayor of New York. The Democratic Socialists of America-affiliated (DSA) candidate also campaigned for the Democratic Party on a platform of affordability and expanding social services by taxing corporations and high-income earners. While Mamdani primarily attracted the support of Black Americans, public housing dwellers and lower-income residents in Bronx and Queens, a survey commissioned by the Council on American-Islamic Relations (CAIR) also found that 97% of Muslim voters in New York supported Mamdani. The same CAIR survey also found that Muslim American voters favored Democratic candidates in several 2025 electoral races including Lieutenant Governor of Virginia Ghazala Hashmi (95%), Governor of Virginia Abigail Spanberger (85%) and Governor of New Jersey Mikie Sherrill (85%). 76 Muslim candidates stood in various elections nationwide in 2025, with 38 being elected. According to CAIR, the survey showed that Muslim Americans were actively engaging in the civic process and that the Democratic Party was recovering the support of some Muslim voters who deserted the party during the 2024 US presidential election in response to Biden's support for Israel during the Gaza war.

In October 2026, a James Zogby Strategies poll commissioned by the Arab-American Institute found that 59% of Arab-American voters intended to vote for Democratic candidates, compared to 26% who intended to vote for Republican candidates at the 2026 United States midterm elections. The 2026 Zogby poll also found that 48% of Arab-American voters had a left-leaning ideology (democratic-socialist, progressive and liberal), compared to 17% who had a right-leaning ideology (MAGA Republican and conservative). The poll also found that 90% of Arab-American voters regarded Gaza as an important factor in determining their vote while 41% of Arab-American voters refused to support a Democrat who would not end unconditional support for Israel. The 2026 Zogby poll surveyed 500 likely Arab-American voters between October 16 and October 23, and had a margin of error of +/- 4.5%.

During the 2026 midterm elections, a record 126 Muslim candidates were elected at the federal, state and local levels including Abdul El-Sayed, who became the first Muslim to be elected to the US Senate. Other notable new-elected Muslim officeholders included Georgia State Senator-elect Ruwa Romman, New York State Senator-elect Aber Kawas, Illinois State Senator-elect Nabeela Syed, and Connecticut State Senator-elect Maryam Khan. In addition, other incumbent Muslim office holders including Congresswoman Ilhan Omar and Minnesota Attorney General Keith Ellison were re-elected. During the 2026 midterm campaign season, the second Trump Administration, Republican operatives and the pro-Israel lobby group American Israel Public Affairs Committee (AIPAC) campaigned against several Muslim candidates including El-Sayed and Omar, accusing the former of promoting anti-American, antisemitic and Islamist agendas and the latter of immigration fraud.

==== Canada ====
In Canada, the Muslim community votes overwhelmingly for the Liberal and New Democratic parties. In 2011 46% of Muslim Canadians had voted for the Liberals, with 38% for the NDP and only 12% for the Conservatives. This support plummeted to 2% in 2015 when 65% of Muslims voted for the Liberal Party and 10% for the NDP.

=== Europe ===
==== United Kingdom ====
A 2015 poll showed that 64% of British Muslims voted for the Labour Party, as opposed to 25% who voted Conservative. The Conservative Party has been accused of Islamophobia, an allegation faced especially by former Prime Minister Boris Johnson. In 2017, 85% of Muslims voted for the Labour Party and only 11% for the Conservatives. Notable figures in British politics who are Muslim include Sadiq Khan (Labour), Mayor of London, and Humza Yousaf (Scottish National Party), First Minister of Scotland.

During the Gaza war, the Labour Party faced criticism from British Muslim supporters after party leader Keir Starmer refused to support an immediate ceasefire in the Gaza Strip. In November 2023, eight Labour MPs including three British Muslims including Afzal Khan, Yasmin Qureshi, and Naz Shah resigned their frontbench positions in protest of the leadership's stance. 56 Labour MPs subsequently supported an unsuccessful Scottish National Party (SNP) amendment calling for a ceasefire to the conflict. That same month, a Savanta snapshot poll found that 41% of Muslim voters felt negative about Labour since the outbreak of the Israel-Gaza war.

In late January 2024, The Guardian reported that Starmer's office had begun polling and holding focus groups among British Muslim voters after senior party officials expressed concern that Labour was losing the support of Muslim constituents. In addition, a new website called "The Muslim Vote" was launched to mobilise British Muslim voters during the 2024 United Kingdom general election and encourage them to support MPs who supported an immediate ceasefire in Gaza during the November 2023 vote.

In February 2024, polling conducted by polling company Survation indicated that Labour's support among Muslim voters had declined by 26 points to 80%. The Survation poll also found that only 60% of British Muslim voters who had supported Labour during the 2019 United Kingdom general election were willing to vote for the party again at the next general election and that 85% of Muslim voters would vote for parties based on their position on the Israel Gaza war. The Labour Muslim Network condemned the party's response to the Israel-Gaza war and warned that Muslim voters "will not support any political party that does not fervently oppose the crimes committed against the people of Gaza." Several Muslim Labour councillors in Oxford, Burnley, Blackburn and Walsall resigned, threatening Labour control of several local councils. Labour also encountered challenges in several electorates with significant Muslim populations including Rochdale, Ilford North, and the London borough of Newham.

Former Labour MP and left-wing politician George Galloway has also appealed to Muslim voters in Rochdale by capitalising on their dissatisfaction with the party's Gaza stance. On 29 February 2024, Galloway won the 2024 Rochdale by-election with 40% of the vote. During his victory speech, Galloway accused Starmer of enabling the "catastrophe" in Gaza.

During the 2024 United Kingdom general election, the Green Party of England and Wales won four parliamentary seats and two million votes. Sky News reported that a significant number of British Muslims had switched their vote from Labour to the Greens due to their dissatisfaction with Labour's stance on the Gaza war. During election campaigning, senior Greens politicians including deputy leader Zack Polanski and co-leader Adrian Ramsay targeted Muslim voters by visiting mosques and campaigning for a halt to arms sales to Israel. A Muslim Greens group was also established by Fesl Reza-Khan to mobilise activists. During the 2024 UK election, the Greens' candidate Carla Denyer captured Bristol Central, which has a large British Somali community. The Greens also came second and third place in Sheffield Central, an area with a large Muslim population.

During the 2026 Gorton and Denton by-election on 27 February 2026, the Green Party appealed to British Muslim by distributing leaflets draped with the Palestinian flag at mosques, campaigning on Gaza and highlighting contentious comments by Prime Minister Keir Starmer that had upset the British Muslim community. The Greens' candidate Hannah Spencer ultimately won the election by a margin of 40.7%, with Reform UK and Labour coming second and third place respectively. In response to Spencer's victory, Stamer and Reform's candidate Matthew Goodwin accused the Greens of running a sectarian campaign, with Goodwin attributing the Green victory to a "coalition of Islamists and woke progressives." In addition, Reform UK leader Nigel Farage and the Conservative-linked election observer group Democratic Voters alleged that "family voting" had occurred among British Muslim voters. In response, Spencer and party leader Zach Polanski said that the Greens won because they had campaigned on cost of living issues, defending international law and human rights in Gaza and combating Reform UK.

==== France ====
86% of French Muslims supported Socialist Party candidate François Hollande in 2012. The Muslim support for both Hollande and later Benoît Hamon alongside left-wing candidate Jean-Luc Mélenchon is also in the majority with only 15% supporting right-wing candidates. In the first round of the 2022 French presidential election, around 69% of French Muslims voted for Mélenchon. Notably, Mélenchon was the only major presidential candidate to consistently denounce Islamophobia and discrimination against Muslims.

==== Germany ====
Among Muslims in Germany a 2016 study by the Experts Council on Immigration and Integration found that the majority of Turkish Germans were aligned with left-wing parties. The SPD had the backing of 41%, the CDU had 27%, the Greens 13%, The Left 13%, and others 7%. Among non-Turkish Muslims, support for the CDU/CSU was 40%, the Social Democrats 27%, the Greens 13%, the Left 9%, and others 9%.

==== The Netherlands ====
Muslims in the Netherlands tended to vote for the Labour Party until recently. When three Muslim Members of Parliament quit the Labour Party in 2015 and founded the party Denk, the Labour Party saw a reduction on its support.

==== Sweden ====
In Sweden, around 70-75% of Swedish Muslims are estimated to support the Social Democrats, whilst 10-15% support other parties of the red–green alliance.

=== Asia and Oceania ===
==== India ====
Indian Muslims tend to vote more frequently for the center-left Indian National Congress and its allies, with 43% of support as of 2019. The biggest support came from Assam with 99% of Muslims voting for the INC. Only 8% of Muslims voted for the right-wing Bharatiya Janata Party in 2019, though it was 1% more than in the last election.

==== Israel ====
In Israel, most Arab parties are classified as left-leaning. Of the Joint List, the major coalition of Arab parties, its members are classified as left-wing; Balad, Hadash and Ta'al with former member United Arab List being described as big tent, with some socially conservative and Islamist factions. In 2015, The Joint List received 82% of Arab Israeli support followed by social democratic Zionist Union with 22% and Likud with 15%.

==== Australia ====
In Australia, Muslims tend to vote for the centre-left Labor Party. Younger generations of Australian Muslims tend to also vote for the smaller left-wing parties, notable the Greens.

== See also ==
- Islamo-leftism
- Islamic socialism
- Christian left
- Jewish left
