= Workers and Peasants' Socialist Party =

Workers and Peasants' Socialist Party Parti socialiste ouvrier et paysan
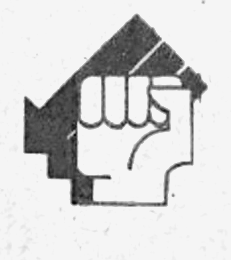
- Leader: Marceau Pivert
- Founded: 1938
- Dissolved: 1940
- Split from: SFIO
- Newspaper: Juin 36
- Membership: Between 8.000 and 10.000
- Ideology: Socialism; Marxism; Communism; Anti-Stalinism; Factions; Leninism; Luxemburgism; Trotskyism; Libertarian socialism
- Political position: Far-left
- International affiliation: IRMC
- Colors: Red

The Workers and Peasants' Socialist Party (Parti socialiste ouvrier et paysan, PSOP) was a socialist organisation in France, formed on June 8, 1938, by Marceau Pivert. Its youth wing was the Workers and Peasants' Socialist Youth (Jeunesses Socialistes Ouvrières et Paysannes – JSOP).

It developed out of a left-wing faction that was expelled from the Section Française de l'Internationale Ouvrière (SFIO), and named itself Gauche Révolutionnaire ("Revolutionary Left"). Alongside moderate Marxists, the party grouped Trotskyists (as an outcome of the French Turn) and Luxemburgists (such as René Lefeuvre). Another well-known leader beside Pivert was Daniel Guérin, a figure of Libertarian Socialism.

Internationally, PSOP was an affiliate of the London Bureau of left-wing socialist parties, which also included the British Independent Labour Party and the Spanish Workers' Party of Marxist Unification (POUM).

Appealing to a minority dissatisfied with both the SFIO and the French Communist Party (PCF), PSOP was a revolutionary socialist party, and had between 8,000 and 10,000 members. It edited the paper Juin 36, named in memory of the 1936 general strike that caused the split between Pivert and the Popular Front government.

In 1939 a small Trotskyist faction split away from the PSOP, establishing the Trotskyist Group, now known as Workers' Struggle (Lutte Ouvrière).

The PSOP collapsed at the beginning of World War II, when it was outlawed by the Vichy regime. Most of its former members joined the French Resistance, in groups affiliated with either the SFIO or the PCF or in L'Insurgé, an independent group around Lyon.
