= Daniel Guérin =

French anarcho-communist author and influential queer anarchist contributor

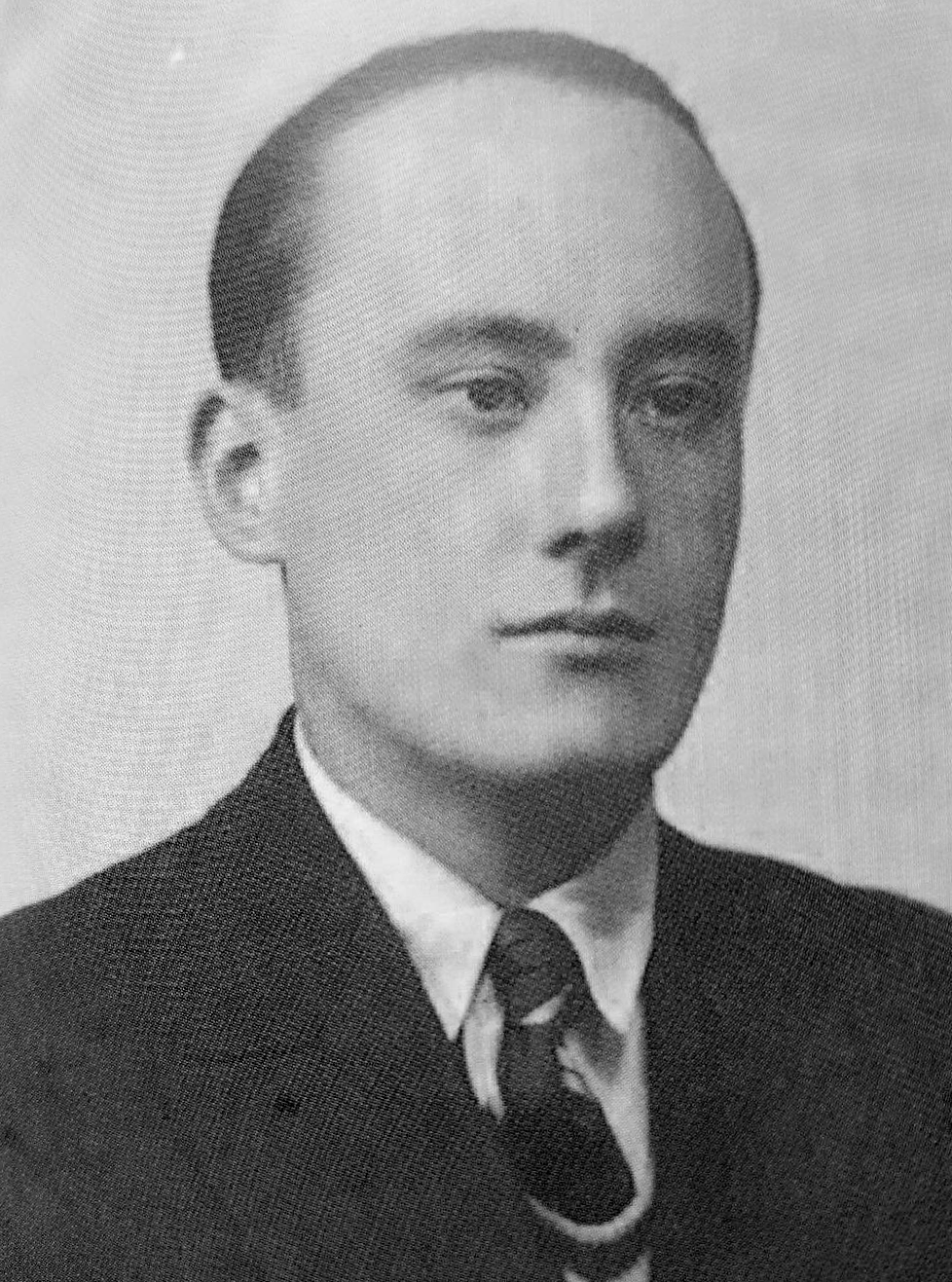
- Daniel Guérin in 1925
- Born: 19 May 1904; Paris, France
- Died: 14 April 1988 (aged 83); Suresnes, Hauts-de-Seine, France

Daniel Guérin (French: [danjɛl ɡeʁɛ̃]; 19 May 1904 – 14 April 1988) was a French libertarian-communist author, best known for his work Anarchism: From Theory to Practice, as well as his collection No Gods No Masters: An Anthology of Anarchism in which he collected writings on the idea and movement it inspired, from the first writings of Max Stirner in the mid-19th century through the first half of the 20th century. He is also known for his opposition to Nazism, fascism, capitalism, imperialism and colonialism, in addition to his support for the Confederación Nacional del Trabajo (CNT) during the Spanish Civil War. His revolutionary defense of free love and homosexuality influenced the development of queer anarchism. He sought to combine the ideology of Marxism and anarchism.

== Early life ==
Daniel Guérin was born in 1904 in Paris, France to a wealthy family. In 1921 he enrolled in The Institute of Political Sciences, or Sciences Po, an elite French university, although he quickly became dissatisfied with his experiences there and dropped out by 1925. He felt distinctly out of place among the throngs of ambitious young students and did not enjoy the academics; he wrote in his Autobiographie de jeunesse: D’une dissidence sexuelle au socialisme, "For me, studies are idiocies that make life hardly worth living." Despite his indifference for studying, he was a talented writer from a young age. Future Nobel Prize winner François Mauriac said that Guérin’s poetry, published in a short book, was evidence of an "exceptional gift." The novelist Colette Audry remarked that his work showed the "birth of a true poet."

Guérin was bisexual. Guérin recalled that he told his father he "preferred" boys shortly after a trip to Greece, to which his father responded by crying and saying to him, "So do I."

== Radicalism ==
As a student, Guérin encountered socialist ideology, but just reading it wasn't enough to engender a political conversion. Ultimately, Guérin's engagement with socialism first stemmed from sexual affairs with young Parisian workers. He said later in life, "It was in bed with them that I discovered the working class, much more than through Marxist writings." In his Eux et lui he also wrote:

"I did not deny, I did not desecrate my socialism when I exalted phallism. My socialism and my phallism, in fact, the more that I thought about it, were not in contradiction. To tell the truth, I didn’t have to choose between the two. Their deep synthesis had ended up forming the substance of my being... Because I had come to socialism through phallism. It was not pity, brotherhood overflowing from my heart, it was not the reading of theorists – undertaken much later, as enlightening as the removal of cataracts – it was no more than a social injustice felt in my very own flesh that had made me into a socialist."

Guérin became radicalized through his travels to many of the various French colonies. He described his journeys through in particular Lebanon, French Indochina, and northern Vietnam, noting the barbarity of European colonialism in great detail. In Autobiographie de jeunesse he described colonists as: "'such human garbage, doleful men, engaged in an endless card game, or slandering one another'; '[t]hese little white men [petits Blancs], prison guards, police officers, customs officers, manille [a card game] players and absinthe drinkers, pot-bellied slavedrivers of coolies'." During his travels he frequently engaged with and aided Communists and Trotskyists, who were fighting against French control. Upon returning to Paris, he claimed to have "more or less found [him]self." Guérin wrote in his Autobiographie de jeunesse:

"My move in the direction of socialism wasn’t objective, or of an intellectual order... It was more subjective, physical, coming from feeling and the heart. It wasn’t in books, it was in me, first of all, through years of sexual frustration, and it was through contact with young oppressed people that I learned to hate the established order. The carnal quest freed me from social segregation."

== Political activism ==
In 1933, Hitler rose to power. Guérin toured Germany by bicycle that summer, seeking to understand the German people’s motivations for supporting Hitler and find the "other" Germany, made up of oppositionist groups still assembling against Hitler; he collected leaflets produced illegally by oppositionist groups and smuggled them out of Germany in his bicycle frame. His experiences led him to produce a series of articles and two books, titled The Brown Plague and Fascism and Big Business. In these, he argued that fascism was “an instrument in the service of big capital” motivated by industry bosses, and that the only way to fight it was through socialism. Guérin allied with the small body of Trotskyists led by German Jewish exile Martin Monath.

In France in 1936, after a failed coup by fascists, the Popular Front alliance, a cumulation of France's communists and socialists, was elected. An extensive strike movement began in response, spanning the entire country and consisting of 2 million workers, who struck mainly in the workplace. Guérin was active in the organization of the strike movement. In Les Lilas, where he lived, Guérin was the secretary of the local committee for trade union propaganda. Guérin worked with the most radical faction of the Socialist Party, the Revolutionary Left tendency headed by Marceau Pivert. The Revolutionary Left tendency was ultimately removed from the SFIO in 1938, but Guérin was not finished. That same year he co-founded the Workers' and Peasants' Socialist Party, and the tendency's former members thronged to it. Guérin hoped that it would become a strong party, but it was too small and divided to last through the beginning of the Second World War and was outlawed by the Vichy regime in 1940.

In 1939, he moved to Oslo to work for the International Revolutionary Marxist Centre, a London-based group of small socialist parties. He was detained by Nazi troops in April 1940, but was released only a couple months later because of health reasons. In 1942, Germany ordered all French citizens to return home. He settled back in Paris and took up editing radical anti-war propaganda from both sides of the conflict. After 1945, Guérin was less supportive of Trotskyism, and he became more interested in anarchism. He began to research and write about the history of anarchism, and joined several anarchist organizations.

From 1946 to 1949, Guérin spent time traveling across America, meeting with political leaders and activists, including C. L. R. James and W. E. B. Du Bois. He expressed strong mistrust of the United States but empathized with those who experienced discrimination within it: "I have an unshakeable faith in the future of the American people. It must not be confused with a few monopolies which dishonour it in the eyes of the world." (His skepticism was noted; between 1950 and 1957 he was not allowed a visa to visit the U.S.) Guérin documented his experiences and new knowledge in a 2-volume collected called Où va le peuple américain? (Where Are the American People Going?), parts of which were later published in Décolonisation du Noir américain (Decolonisation of the Black American) in 1963, and Africains du Nouveau Monde (Africans of the New World) in 1984.

== Gay activism ==
Guérin remained closeted for most of his life. The French political left was known to be homophobic, and he knew that coming out would ruin his life and career. He described feeling trapped: "I felt myself cut in two, voicing out loud my new militant [political] beliefs and feeling myself by necessity obliged to hide my private [sexual] tendencies." However, he began advocating for sexual freedom and gay liberation in the early 1950s, and came out after the uprising of May 1968. Guérin soon joined the Front homosexuel d’action révolutionaire (Homosexual Front of Revolutionary Action), which was founded in 1971. Guérin found himself unhappy with the group, as he believed that it consisted of young gay liberationists who intended to "shock and provoke society instead of organizing effectively to change it." He considered its members to be "politically inept, ideologically naive, and 'often very stupid.'" Guérin, appealing to the bold audacity of FHAR, once stripped nude at a general assembly in order to make a point.

Guérin believed that reformist actions were not enough to eradicate prejudice against homosexuals. He argued that gay liberation would "be total and irreversible only if it is achieved within the context of social revolution."

His Autobiographie de jeunesse: D’une dissidence sexuelle au socialisme (Autobiography of Youth: From Sexual Dissidence to Socialism) was published in 1965. In it he discussed his sexuality in a way that was intended to strike against the homophobia that still riddled the revolutionary Left. He wrote, "My real intention... was to help the homophiles in their fight. To help them, this time, no longer as in some of my earlier books, through some developments that were of a scientific character, sociological, juridical, sexological, etcetera, but through the exposé of an individual case."

In Homosexualité et révolution, he wrote: "In order to omit nothing from my discourse of a whole life, that never, at no moment, in no manner whatsoever, has the intensity, the multiplicity, the frenetic nature of my homosexual affairs taken precedence over my militant activity which aims to change the world, nor has it disguised my determination, my revolutionary obstinacy. I say so not to glorify myself, but because it is the strict truth."

Pierre Hahn, a figurehead of the French gay liberation movement, wrote to Guérin in 1975, saying that: "More than to anyone else, homosexuals are grateful to you... for everything you have done for them. . . . The most valuable thing you have done is a life's work that is both political (in the traditional sense) and sexological: it's [your books like] The Brown Plague [on fascism] plus Kinsey [on the Kinsey Report]; it's Fourier [on the nineteenth-century radical thinker] and the texts against colonialism: finally it's you yourself."

== Late life ==
Guérin was said to be the grandfather of the French gay liberation movement by Frédéric Martel. He continued to have homosexual relationships up to the end of his life. His life was documented in a biographical film called "Combats dans le siécle."

Guérin died on 14 April 1988. He had many political titles and associations, but he died a libertarian Marxist, still seeking to connect the working class with anarchist ideology

== Works ==
- Le livre de la dix-huitième année (poèmes), Paris, Albin Michel, 1922
- L'enchantement du Vendredi Saint (roman), Paris, Albin Michel, 1925
- La vie selon la chair (roman), Paris, Albin Michel, 1929
- Fascisme et grand capital. Italie-Allemagne, Paris, Éditions de la révolution prolétarienne, 1936
  - English translation by Einde O' Callaghan Fascism and Big Business.
- La lutte des classes sous la Première République, 1793-1797, Paris, Gallimard, 2 vol., 1946 (édition abrégée : Bourgeois et bras-nus, 1793-1795, 1968)
- Où va le peuple américain ?, Paris, Julliard, 2 vol., 1950-1951
- Au service des colonisés, Paris, Éditions de Minuit, 1954
- Kinsey et la sexualité, Paris, Julliard, 1955
- Les Antilles décolonisées, préface d'Aimé Césaire, Paris, Présence Africaine, 1956
- Trois problèmes de la Révolution, 1958 essay
  - English translation by Paul Sharkey: "Three Problems of the Revolution"
- Jeunesse du socialisme libertaire, Paris, Rivière, 1959
- Shakespeare et Gide en correctionnelle ?, Paris, Editions du Scorpion, 1959
- Le grain sous la neige, adaptation théâtrale d'après Ignazio Silone, Éditions Mondiales, 1961
- Vautrin, adaptation théâtrale d'après Honoré de Balzac, Paris, La Plume d'or, 1962
- Eux et lui, illustré par André Masson, Monaco, Editions du Rocher, 1962
- Essai sur la révolution sexuelle après Reich et Kinsey, Paris, Belfond, 1963
- Front Populaire, révolution manquée ?, Paris, Julliard, 1963
- Décolonisation du noir américain, Paris, Présence Africaine, 1963
- L'Algérie qui se cherche, Paris, Présence Africaine, 1964
- Un jeune homme excentrique. Essai d'autobiographie, Paris, Julliard, 1965
- Sur le fascisme : I- La peste brune; II- Fascisme et grand capital, Paris, Maspero, 1965 (réédition). English translation of La peste brune by Robert Schwartzwald: The Brown Plague. Travels in Late Weimar and Early Nazi Germany, Durham (NC), Duke UP, 1994.
- L'anarchisme. De la doctrine à l'action, Paris, Gallimard, 1965
  - English translation by Mary Klopper: Anarchism: From Theory to Practice, with an introduction by Noam Chomsky, New York: Monthly Review Press, 1970
- Ni Dieu ni maître. Histoire et anthologie de l'anarchie, Paris, Éditions de Delphes, 1965
- Pour un marxisme libertaire, Paris, Laffont, 1969
- Rosa Luxembourg et la spontanéité révolutionnaire, Paris, Flammarion, 1971
- Autobiographie de jeunesse. D'une dissidence sexuelle au socialisme, Paris, Belfond, 1972
- De l'Oncle Tom aux Panthères Noires, Paris, UGE, 1973 (réédition : Les Bons Caractères, 2010)
- Les assassins de Ben Barka. Dix ans d'enquête, Paris, Guy Authier, 1975
- La Révolution française et nous, Paris, Maspero, 1976
- Proudhon oui et non, Paris, Gallimard, 1978
- Homosexualité et révolution, Paris, Le vent du ch'min, 1983
