= Marat Shterin =

Marat Shterin is an author, doctor and researcher of cults and new religious movements. He is also a lecturer in Sociology of Religion at King's College London, United Kingdom.

== Early life ==
Marat Shterin was born and grew up in Moscow, Russia. As a youth, he showed promise as an athlete and gymnast, but chose instead to pursue his academic interests. He studied History at Moscow University before moving to London to continue his studies and began studying Sociology.

== Recent Activity ==
Marat Shterin has been researching new religious movements and is a board member of the Non Governmental Organisation INFORM that provides information about such groups. He has also written many books on the subject. His particular area of expertise is the sociology of religion and new religious movements in former Soviet countries in eastern Europe. Shterin is currently the leader of the Religion in Contemporary Society Master of Arts programme at King's College London.

Regarding new religious movements in Russia, he has said "some feel that the official Church does not live up to its salvationist mission and they get attracted to new prophecies and prophets."

He has also worked for the American International Development Agency.

== Bibliography ==
- Shterin, Marat (2002). 'Cult controveries [sic]' in contemporary England and Russia : a sociological comparison (PhD thesis). University of London. OCLC 59317333.
- Al-Rasheed, Madawi; Shterin, Marat (2009). Dying for Faith: Religiously Motivated Violence in the Contemporary World. Bloomsbury Academic. ISBN 978-1-84511-687-3.
- Shterin, Marat (2001). "New Religions in the New Russia". Nova Religio. 4 (2): 310–321. doi:10.1525/nr.2001.4.2.310. JSTOR 10.1525/nr.2001.4.2.310.
