= Jenny Fitzpatrick =

English actress

Jennifer Fitzpatrick (born 1983) is an English actress who is best known for her performances in musicals in the West End and on tour in the UK. She has also performed in Europe and appeared on television, and she co-wrote the screenplay for the 2012 film Payback Season.

== Early life ==
Fitzpatrick was born in Essex in 1983 and appeared as a child in two local theatre companies, Youngstars and The Essex Group. Fitzpatrick completed a BTEC Extended Diploma in performing arts at Barking and Dagenham College, and she then studied at the Mountview Academy of Theatre Arts.

== Theatre ==
In 2004 at Regent's Park Open Air Theatre, Fitzpatrick had her first professional roles in Henry IV, Part 1, A Midsummer Night's Dream (as Flock) and Camelot. Her other stage roles include Jill Goose in Mother Goose at the Watford Palace Theatre (2004), Nala in The Legend of the Lion King at Disneyland Paris (2006).

She first appeared in the West End as Ronette in 2007 in Little Shop of Horrors. The production began at the Menier Chocolate Factory in 2006 and then transferred to the Duke of York's Theatre. In 2008, Fitzpatrick played Billie in the UK tour of "Our House", directed by Matthew Warchus. She also played Angie in the musical's 10 year anniversary concert at the Savoy Theatre in 2012 and Mimi in a West End gala performance of Rent at the Garrick Theatre. In 2008–2009 Fitzpatrick appeared as the Rose Seller in the revival of the musical Oliver! at the Theatre Royal, Drury Lane. She played Alice Fitzwarren in Dick Whittington at the Nottingham Playhouse in 2008 and the Princess in Aladdin at the West Yorkshire Playhouse (2010).

Fitzpatrick originated the role of Louise in Ghost the musical (2011) at London's Piccadilly Theatre, after a tryout at the Manchester Opera House. Lizzie Loveridge, reviewing the show for CurtainUp, wrote: "The best comedy is from Sharon D Clarke and her pair of charlatan spiritualists, Clara and Louise (Lisa Davina Phillip and Jenny Fitzpatrick)". Fitzpatrick began working with the company Complicité in 2014 performing in a workshop for the stage adaptation of Pink Floyd's The Wall, directed by Simon McBurney. She played the role of Diva in Peter Pan at the Manchester Opera House in 2013, and a Bluette in European tours of the Blues Brothers musical (2014 and 2016). Fitzpatrick returned to the West End, playing Dr Lacey in the musical A Pacifist's Guide to the War on Cancer, by Bryony Kimmings and Brian Lobel at the National Theatre in 2016.

In 2013 Fitzpatrick played the lead role of Tina Turner in the musical Soul Sister in the UK tour. The following year, Fitzpatrick starred in the musical Sister Act as Deloris Van Cartier at Aberystwyth Arts Centre. In the 2017 UK tour of Thoroughly Modern Millie she played the role of Muzzy Van Hossmere to glowing reviews: "Fitzpatrick's Muzzy is outstanding. With great characterization and powerful vocals she really steals the show." Later that year, she played Lucius in a stage adaptation of the Boudica story by Tristan Bernays at Shakespeare's Globe in London.

She returned to the West End and again portrayed Tina Turner from 2018 to 2019 in Tina: The Tina Turner Musical at the Aldwych Theatre, alternating in the role with Adrienne Warren. Rob Russo, reviewing her performance in Stage Left, wrote: "Fitzpatrick … was excellent, and in the finale concert eerily became Tina Turner."

In 2023, Fitzpatrick played the character of Nancy in the musical Oliver! at Leeds Playhouse. Fitzpatrick won best performer in a musical for her performance of Nancy in the UK Theatre Awards in 2024.

== TV/ Film ==
Fitzpatrick has appeared in the television shows Silent Witness as a prison guard (2 episodes in 2005), EastEnders as Leanne (2 episodes in 2005) and M.I. High as the Grey Ninja (2011). In 2012 she played the character of Malevolent in the online comedy drama The Bloody Mary Show.

In 2011 Fitzpatrick co-wrote the screenplay of a feature film, Payback Season, which was released in UK cinemas in 2012.

Fitzpatrick will also be the voice of Clarabel in the Thomas & Friends reboot, Thomas & Friends: Railway Stories.
