= McBurney (surname) =

McBurney is a Scottish surname. Notable people with the surname include:

- Andrew McBurney (1817–1894), American politician
- Charles McBurney (archaeologist) (1914–1979), American archaeologist
- Charles McBurney (politician) (born 1957), American politician
- Charles McBurney (surgeon) (1845–1913), American surgeon
- Gerard McBurney (born 1954), English composer and radio presenter
- Jim McBurney (1933–2019), Canadian ice hockey player
- John F. McBurney III (born 1950), American politician
- Judy McBurney (1948–2018), Australian actress
- Larry McBurney, American politician
- Margaret McBurney (1931–2018), Canadian writer
- Mona McBurney (1862–1932), British pianist and composer
- Simon McBurney (born 1957), English actor
- Stephen McBurney (born 1967), Australian rules football umpire
- Waldo McBurney (1902–2009), American beekeeper and autobiographer
- William B. McBurney (died 1892), Irish poet
