= Complicité =

Theatre company

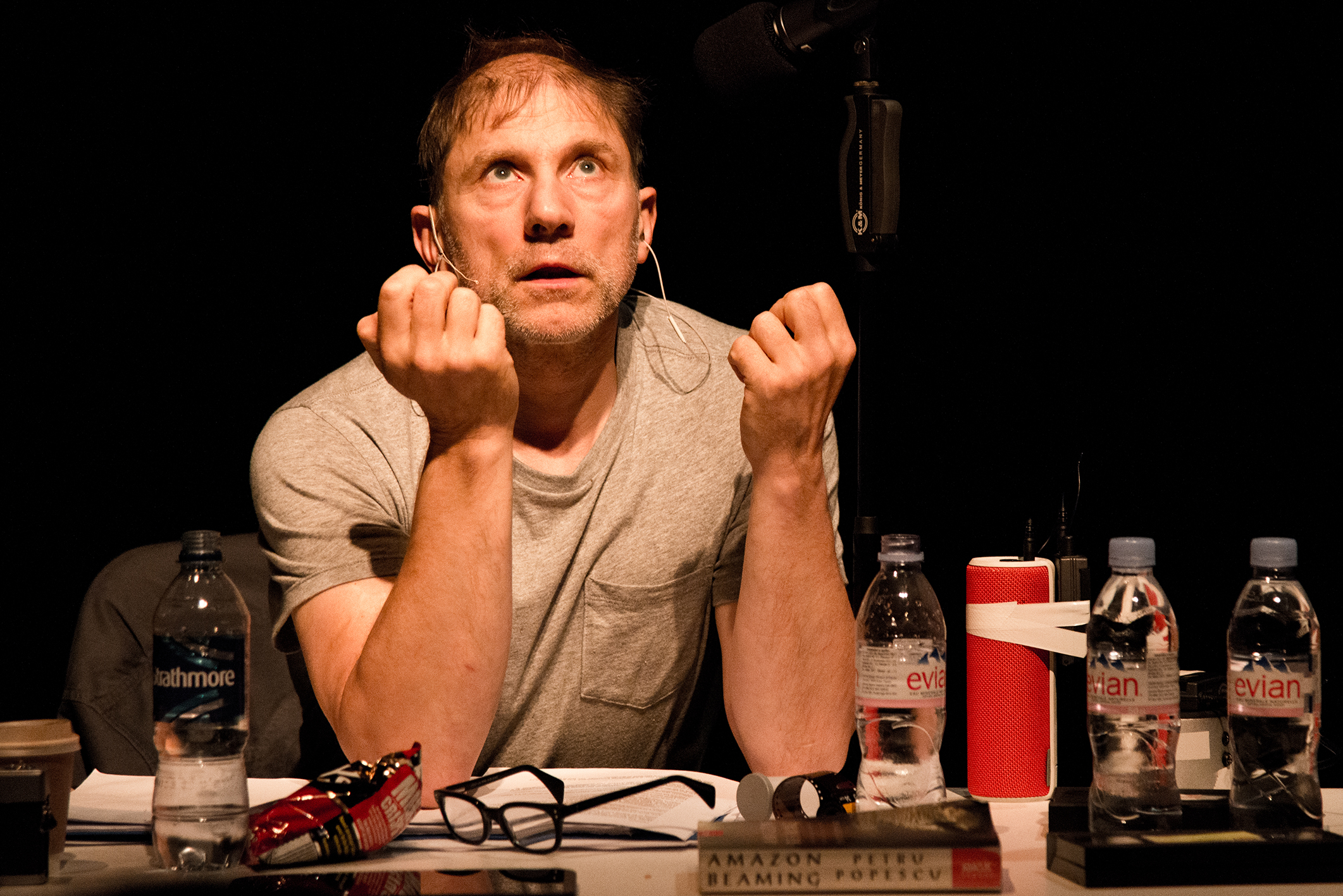
- Simon McBurney in The Encounter (2015)
- Formation: 1983
- Type: Theatre group
- Location: United Kingdom
- Website: complicite.org

Complicité is a British theatre company founded in 1983 by Simon McBurney, Annabel Arden, Marcello Magni, and Fiona Gordon. Its original name was Théâtre de Complicité. The company is based in London and uses extreme movement to represent their work, with surrealist imagery. Its work has been influenced by Jacques Lecoq, Philippe Gaulier, and Monika Pagneux. The company produced their first performance in 1983, and in 1985 they won the Perrier Comedy Award at the Edinburgh Fringe Festival. Complicité has gone on to receive multiple Olivier Awards and Evening Standard Awards, the Europe Theatre Prize, as well as multiple Tony Award and Drama Desk Award nominations. Their productions often involve technology such as projection and cameras, and cover serious themes.

They describe the main principles of their work as "seeing what is most alive, integrating text, music, image and action to create surprising, disruptive theatre".

The company's lineup changes frequently, though McBurney continues to be the artistic director. Complicité is currently more active as an international touring company than within the United Kingdom. The Company is based in London but tours the UK and internationally.

== Major productions ==
Major productions include The Encounter (2015), The Master and Margarita (2011/12), A Dog's Heart (2010) with De Nederlandse Opera and English National Opera, Endgame (2009), Shun-kin (2008), A Disappearing Number (2007), Measure for Measure (2004), The Elephant Vanishes (2003, 2004) (performed in Japanese, adapted from the work of the writer Haruki Murakami), The Noise of Time (2000) (about the Russian composer Dimitri Shostakovich, title from the 1925 memoir and collected essays by the poet Osip Mandelstam, published in English in 1993); Mnemonic (1999); and The Street of Crocodiles (1992) (inspired by the life and works of Bruno Schulz).

The Master and Margarita, an adaptation of Mikhail Bulgakov’s novel, sold out its run at The Barbican, London in March/April 2012 and toured Europe in 2012. In 2010 A Disappearing Number (2010, 2008, 2007) which played at the Novello Theatre, Barbican Theatre and Theatre Royal, Plymouth, is a play about the mathematicians Ramanujan and G. H. Hardy, the study of pure mathematics, the concepts of infinity and string theory. It focuses on our "relentless compulsion to understand". The music was written by Nitin Sawhney and the dramaturge was Ben Power. The play won many awards, including the Laurence Olivier Award 2008 for Best New Play. It was produced at the Lincoln Center Festival in New York City in 2010 and toured to Mumbai and Hyderabad. In 2010 it was broadcast to over 300 cinema screens worldwide as part of NT Live.

Shun-kin (2008), performed in Japanese, was adapted from Junichiro Tanizaki. It was first performed in Tokyo (February 2008) and then toured to London. It was revived in Tokyo in March 2009 and in London, Paris, Tokyo and Taipei in 2010.

In 2022, they produced The Dark is Rising, a 12 episode radio dramatisation of Susan Cooper’s novel. It was directed and adapted by Simon McBurney with co-adaptor Robert Macfarlane. It was broadcast on the BBC World Service on December 22nd, 2022, and a 4 episode adaption was broadcast on BBC Radio 4. It featured original music by Johnny Flynn and Josh Sneesby, with sound design by Gareth Fry.

== Europe Theatre Prize ==
In 1997, the Théâtre de Complicité and its artistic director Simon McBurney were awarded the III Europe Prize Theatrical Realities, with the following motivation:

Théâtre de Complicité, which is one of the most original and inventive British theatre companies, was founded in 1983. It was created by four young people whose aim was to bring the physical disciplines they had learned at the Jacques Lecoq Mime School in Paris to the largely text-based British theatre. But over the last thirteen years the company has not only acquired an international reputation, it has also grown organically. It now combines a strong mimetic skill with the exploration of complex literary texts. It has forged its own uniquely brilliant style which makes it a worthy winner of the Europe Prize Theatrical Realities. Its founder members were Simon McBurney, Marcello Magno, Fiona Gordon who had all studied together in Paris and Annabel Arden who was a contemporary of Simon at Cambridge University. The first production, Put It On Your Head, was a darkly hilarious examination of an English seaside resort and attracted modest attention. There followed a series of shows dealing with such subjects as our attitudes to death, food, Christmas and office-life. Gradually built up a following for its original vision, grotesque comedy and dazzling mime. But the breakthrough came in 1988 when it presented a 15-weeks season of its work at London's Almeida Theatre including its first ever production of an existing text: a version of Durrenmatt's The visit which contained a prize winning performance by Kathryn Hunter as the vengeful plutocrat and which used mime to recreate the atmosphere of a small, run-down European town. Peter Brook, who saw the production, rated it as superior to his own version in the late '50s. Since then Complicité has become one of the most sought-after companies on the international touring circuit and has been adapted literally from texts to the stage including Bruno Schulz's Street of Crocodiles, John Berger' s The Three Lives of Lucie Cabrol and J.M. Coetzee's Foe. But it has expanded its range and style without sacrifing its experimental instinct or physical discipline. Above all, it shows an astonishing ability to re-create whole communities such as that of a small Polish town in Street of Crocodiles and a peasant village in the Hautes-Alpes in Lucie Cabrol. Complicité are currently working on a co-production of Brecht's The Caucasian Chalk Circle with the National Theatre of Great Britain. But it remains one of the most audacious and genuinely experimental companies at work in European Theatre today.

== Funding ==
Other than revenue from ticket sales, Complicité receives funding from two sources: Arts Council England and private donations.

"Complicité creates inspirational physical-based theatre, which it tours both nationally and internationally to world-class venues and partners. The company also provides a programme of professional workshops and educational initiatives. Our funding supports core costs." Complicité received £370,021 in 2008/2009, £380,012 in 2009/2010 and £390,272 in 2010/2011 from the Council.

== Productions index ==
Year	Production	Director	Writer/ Adapter	Design	Cast	Awards
1983	Put it on Your Head	"The Company"	"The Company"	-	Annabel Arden, Fiona Gordon, Marcello Magni, Simon McBurney	
1984	A Minute too Late	Simon McBurney	Jozef Houben, Simon McBurney, and Marcello Magni, with Annabel Arden		Jozef Houben, Simon McBurney and Marcello Magni	
1985	More Bigger Snacks Now	Neil Bartlett	"The Company"	-	Tim Barlow, Jos Houben, Marcello Magni, Simon McBurney	1985 Perrier Award, 1986 Time Out Fringe Award for Best Touring Production
1986	Foodstuff	Simon McBurney	"The Company"	Lucy Weller, Dougie Laing, Laura McLoughlin	Mario Aguerre, Annabel Arden, David Backler, Tim Barlow, Michael Barnfather, Ian Cooke, Coralene Chambers, Suzanne Dawson, Gay Gaynor, Gerard Flanagan, Marc Fremond, Celia Gore Booth, Phil Gunderson, Jozef Houben, Casper Hummel, Marcello Magni, Graziella Martinez, Hamish McColl, Pat Mitchell, Deobi Oparei, Linda Kerr Scott, Susan Todd, Micheline Vandepoel, Sue Westergaard	
1986	Please, Please, Please	Annabel Arden	"The Company"	Lucy Weller	Mick Barnfather, Celia Gore Booth, Linda Kerr Scott, Marcello Magni, Simon McBurney	
1987	Anything For A Quiet Life	Simon McBurney	"The Company"	Design: Jan Pienkowski Lighting, John Listrum	Annabel Arden, Celia Gore Booth, Kathryn Hunter, Marcello Magni, Myra McFadyen, Stefan Metz, Boris Ostan	
1989	The Lamentations of Thel	Annabel Arden	Dimitri Smirnov	Willow Winston	Jane W Davidson, Lore Lixemberg	
1989	Anything For A Quiet Life (TV)	Simon McBurney	"The Company"	Jan Pienkowski	Annabel Arden, Celia Gore Booth, Kathryn Hunter, Marcello Magni, Myra McFadyen, Stefan Metz, Boris Ostan	Adapted For Television for Channel 4
1989	The Visit	Annabel Arden and Simon McBurney	adapted by Maurice Valency after Friedrich Dürrenmatt	Design: Rae Smith, Lighting: Luke Sapsed, Sound: Nic Jones, Christopher Shutt	Mick Barnfather, Lilo Baur, Celia Gore Booth, Jasper Britton, Richard Hope, Kathryn Hunter, Simon McBurney, Marcello Magni, Eric Mallett, Julianne Mason, Clive Mendus	1990- Laurence Olivier Award, Best Actress, Kathryn Hunter. 1989 Time Out Theatre Award for Best Director, Annabel Arden
1990	Help! I'm Alive	Jozef Houben and Marcello Magni	"The Company", after Ruzzante		Marcello Magni, Kathryn Hunter, Clive Mendus, Lilo Baur, Toby Sedgwick	
1991	The Visit (revival)	Annabel Arden and Simon McBurney	adapted by Maurice Valency after Friedrich Dürrenmatt	Design: Rae Smith, Lighting: Luke Sapsed, Sound: Nic Jones, Christopher Shutt	Mick Barnfather, Lilo Baur, Celia Gore Booth, Jasper Britton, Richard Hope, Kathryn Hunter, Simon McBurney, Marcello Magni, Eric Mallett, Julianne Mason, Clive Mendus	
1992	The Winter's Tale	Annabel Arden with Annie Castledine	William Shakespeare	Design: Ariane Gastambide, Lighting: Ben Ormerod, Sound: Christopher Shutt	Lilo Baur, Kathryn Hunter, Mark Lewis Jones, Simon McBurney, Dhobi Oparei, Vicki Pepperdine, Gabrielle Reidy, Leo Wringer, Marcello Magni	
1992-93	The Street of Crocodiles	Simon McBurney	Adapted by Simon McBurney and Mark Wheatley from Bruno Schulz	Design: Rae Smith, Lighting: Paule Constable, Sound: Christopher Shutt	Annabel Arden, Lilo Baur, Hayley Carmichael, Antonio Gil Martinez, Joyce Henderson, Eric Mallett, Clive Mendus, Cesar Sarachu, Matthew Scurfield	1994 Dublin Theatre Festival Award for Best Touring Production, 1994 L'Academie Quebecoisedu Theatre Award for Best Foreign Production 1993 Manchester Evening Standard Award for Best Visiting Production, 1993 Barcelona Critics Award for Best Foreign Production
1994-95	Out of a house walked a man...	Simon McBurney	An adaptation by Jos Houben, Simon McBurney and Mark Wheatley from the writings of Daniil Kharms, Original score composed by Gerard McBurney	Design: Tim Hatley, Lighting: Paule Constable, Sound: Christopher Shutt	Sophie Grimmer, Paul Hamilton, Jos Houben, Kathryn Hunter, Toby Jones, Lore Lixenburg, Marcello Magni, Myra McFadyen, Charlotte Medcalf, Toby Sedgwick, Brian Shelley, Edward Woodall	
1994-97	The Three Lives of Lucie Cabrol	Simon McBurney	Simon McBurney & Mark Wheatley	Design: Tim Hatley, Lighting: Paule Constable, Sound: Christopher Shutt	Lilo Baur, Mick Barnfather, Hannes Flaschberger, Simon McBurney, Tim McMullan, Stefan Metz, Hélène Patarôt	1997 Toronto DORA Award Best Production of a Play, 1997 Toronto CORA Award Best Actress (Lilo Baur), 1996 Belgrade International Festival Grand Prix, 1996 Best Performance of the Belgrade International Festival voted by the audience, 1996 Belgrade Daily Newspaper Politika Prize for Best Director (Simon McBurney), 1995 The Age Newspaper Critic's Award for Creative Excellence at the Melbourne International Festival, 1995 Barcelona Critic's Award for Best Foreign Production, 1994 Manchester Evening News Award for Best Actress in a Visiting Production (Lilo Baur), 1994 Time Out Theatre Award, 1994 TMA/Martini Award for Best UK Touring Production
1996	Foe	Annie Castledine and Marcello Magni	Adapted by Mark Wheatley from the novel by J. M. Coetzee	Peter Mumford	Selma Alispahic, Hannes Flaschberger, Kathryn Hunter, Marcello Magni, Patrice Naiambara, Rob Pickavance	
1997	The Caucasian Chalk Circle	Simon McBurney	Bertolt Brecht Translated by Frank McGuinness	Design: Tim Hatley, Lighting: Paule Constable, Sound: Christopher Shutt, Projection: Kate Slater Jones	Selma Alispahic, Clive Bell, Peter Collins, Bronagh Gallagher, Kulvinder Ghir, Antonio Gil Martinez, Faroque Khan, Jeffrey Kissoon, Simon McBurney, Tim McMullan, Clive Mendus, Maggie O'Brien, Michael Ormiston, Hélène Patarôt, Robert Patterson, Nicholas Robinson, Edward Savage, Juliet Stevenson, Joe Townsend	1998 Laurence Olivier Award Simon McBurney, 1998 Liverpool Echo Best Actor Award Simon McBurney
1997-98	The Chairs	Simon McBurney	Eugène Ionesco in a new translation by Martin Crimp	Design: Brothers Quay, Lighting: Paul Anderson, Sound: Paul Arditti	Mick Barnfather, Sarah Baxter, Richard Briers, Geraldine McEwan	1998 Six Tony Nominations and six Drama Desk Nominations, 1998 Drama Desk Award for Best Design (Quay Brothers), 1998 Laurence Olivier Award Nomination for Lighting Design (Paul Anderson), 1998 Time Out Live Award (Geraldine McEwan), 1998 Barclays/TMA Theatre Award for Best Actress (Geraldine McEwan)
1997	To The Wedding	Simon McBurney	(For Radio) Based on the novel by John Berger, adapted by Simon McBurney, John Berger and Mark Wheatley	-	Lilo Baur, Kathryn Hunter, Simon McBurney, Katrin Cartlidge, Marcello Magni, Richard Hope, Tim McMullan, Sandro Mabellini, Hannes Flaschberger, Annabel Arden, Velibor Topic, Mick Barnfather, Susan Henry, Michael Mears	
1994-97	The Three Lives of Lucie Cabrol (Revival)	Simon McBurney	Simon McBurney & Mark Wheatley	Design: Tim Hatley, Lighting: Paule Constable, Sound: Christopher Shutt	Lilo Baur, Mick Barnfather, Hannes Flaschberger, Simon McBurney, Tim McMullan, Stefan Metz, Hélène Patarôt	
1998-99	The Street of Crocodiles (revival)	Simon McBurney	Adapted by Simon McBurney and Mark Wheatley from Bruno Schulz	Design: Rae Smith, Lighting: Paule Constable, Sound: Christopher Shutt	Annabel Arden, Bronagh Gallagher, Gregory Gudgeon, Marcello Magni, Eric Mallett, Antonio Gil Martinez, Charlotte Medcalf, Clive Mendus, Stefan Metz, Cesar Sarachu, Matthew Scurfield, Ásta Sighvats	
1999	The Vertical Line	Simon McBurney and John Berger	Simon McBurney and John Berger	-	-	
1999-01	Mnemonic	Simon McBurney	"The Company"	Design: Michael Levine, Lighting: Paul Anderson, Sound: Christopher Shutt, Costume: Christina Cunningham	Katrin Cartlidge, Richard Katz, Simon McBurney, Tim McMullan, Eric Mallett, Stefan Metz, Kostas Philippoglou, Catherine Schaub Abkarian, Daniel Wahl	2002, Golden Mask Critics' Award, Festival Mess, Sarajevo, 2001 Drama Desk Award for Unique Theatrical Experience, 2001 Drama Desk Award for Best Lighting Design (Paul Anderson), 2001 Drama Desk Award for Best Sound Design (Christopher Shutt), 2001 Lucille Lortel Award for Outstanding Achievement off Broadway for Unique Theatrical Experience, for Best Sound Design (Christopher Shutt) and for Best Lighting Design (Paul Anderson), 2001 Syndicat Professionnel de la Critique Dramatique et Musicale, Grand Prix de la Critique for Best Foreign Play, 2001 Time Out Live Award for Outstanding Achievement, 1999 The Critic's Circle Award for Best, New Play
2000	Light	Simon McBurney	Based on the book by Torgny Lindgren, adapted by Simon McBurney and Matthew Broughton	Design: Dick Bird, Lighting: Paul Anderson, Sound: Paul Arditti, Costume: Christina Cunningham	Joseph Alessi, Mick Barnfather, Lilo Baur, Bronagh Gallagher, Dermot Kerrigan, Tim McMullan, Tobias Menzies, Toby Sedgwick	
2000-02	The Noise of Time	Simon McBurney	"The Company"	Design: Joanna Parker, Lighting: Paul Anderson, Sound: Christopher Shutt with Gareth Fry, Costume: Christina Cunnigham Projections: Jan Hartley	Tim McMullan, Antonio Gil Martinez, Charlotte Medcalf, Richard Katz, Toby Sedgwick, Jan Knightley	
2002	The Resistible Rise of Arturo Ui	Simon McBurney	Bertolt Brecht	Robert Innes Hopkins	Al Pacino, Steve Buscemi, Dominic Chianese, Billy Crudup, Charles Durning, Paul Giamatti, John Goodman, Chazz Palminteri, Tony Randall, Linda Emond, Sterling K. Brown, Ajay Naidu, Lothaire Bluteau, Jacqueline McKenzie|, Robert Stanton, John Ventimiglia, William Sadler	
2002-03	Mnemonic (revival)	Simon McBurney	"The Company"	Design: Michael Levine, Lighting: Paul Anderson, Sound: Christopher Shutt, Costume: Christina Cunningham	Dan Fredenburgh, Susan Lynch, Simon McBurney, Tim McMullan, Stefan Metz, Kostas Philippoglou, Aurelia Petit	
2003	The Elephant Vanishes	Simon McBurney	"The Company" based on the book by Haruki Murakami	Design: Michael Levine, Lighting: Paul Anderson, Sound: Christopher Shutt, Costume: Christina Cunningham, Projection: Ruppert Bohle and Anne O'Connor	Mitsuru Fukikoshi, Yuko Miyamoto, Masato Sakai, Ryōko Tateishi, Keitoku Takada, Atsuko Takaizumi	2004 Kinokuniya Theatre Award for Best Actress (Ryōko Tateishi), 2003 Evening Standard Theatre Award Nomination for Best Director (Simon McBurney)
2004	Strange Poetry	Simon McBurney, Music by Gerard McBurney	Music by Gerard McBurney	Sound: Christopher Shutt and Gareth Fry, Lighting: Paul Anderson, Costume: Christina Cunningham, Projection and Video: Francis Laporte	Antonio Gil Martinez, John Flax, Tamzin Griffin, Sophie Grimmer, Richard Katz, Simon McBurney, Yasuyo Mochizuki, Robert Tannion, Tom Ward and The London Philharmonic Orchestra	
2004	Measure for Measure	Simon McBurney	William Shakespeare	Design: Tom Pye, Lighting: Paul Anderson, Sound: Christopher Shutt, Costume: Christina Cunningham, Projection: Sven Ortel	Simon McBurney, Mike Grady, Angus Wright, Paul Rhys, Ajay Naidu, Clive Mendus, Tamzin Griffin, Richard Katz, Ben Meyjes, Craig Parkinson, Steven Crossley, Naomi Frederick, Katie Jones, Kostas Philippoglou, Jamie Bradley, Anamaria Marinca and Hannes Flaschberger	2005 The Ian Charleson Award second place (Naomi Frederick), 2004 Critics' Circle Award for Best Performance in a Shakespearean Role (Paul Rhys)
2004	The Elephant Vanishes (revival)	Simon McBurney	"The Company" based on the book by Haruki Murakami	Design: Michael Levine, Lighting: Paul Anderson, Sound: Christopher Shutt, Costume: Christina Cunningham, Projection: Ruppert Bohle and Anne O'Connor	Mitsuru Fukikoshi, Yuko Miyamoto, Yasuyo Mochizuki, Keitoku Takada, Atsuko Takaizumi, Ryoko Tateish, Kentaro Mizuki	
2004	Pet Shop Boys meet Eisenstein	Simon McBurney	Original Score by the Pet Shop Boys	Art Direction: Simon McBurney, Projection: Sven Ortel	The Pet Shop Boys, Dresdner Sinfoniker, Simon McBurney, Tim McMullen, Charlotte Medcalf	
2005	A Minute Too Late (revival)	Simon McBurney	Jozef Houben, Simon McBurney, and Marcello Magni, with Annabel Arden	Design: Tom Pye with James Humphrey, Lighting: Paul Anderson, Sound: Christopher Shutt, Costume: Christina Cunningham, Projection: Sven Ortel	Jos Houben, Marcello Magni, Simon McBurney	
2005	The Noise of Time (revival)	Simon McBurney	"The Company"	Design: Joanna Parker, Lighting: Paul Anderson, Sound: Christopher Shutt with Gareth Fry, Costume: Christina Cunnigham	Geir Hytten, Liam Steel, Tom Ward, Ewan Wardrop	
2005	Vanishing Points	Simon McBurney	John Berger and Anne Michaels	Sound: Neil Alexander with Gareth Fry, Projection and Video: Sven Ortel and Lorna Heavey	John Berger, Susan Lynch, Meredith MacNeil, Simon McBurney, Clive Mendus, Anne Michaels, Paul Rhys, Juliet Stevenson	
2005-06	Measure for Measure (revival)	Simon McBurney	William Shakespeare	Design: Tom Pye, Lighting: Paul Anderson, Sound: Christopher Shutt, Costume: Christina Cunningham, Projection: Sven Ortel	Mike Grady, Angus Wright, Ajay Naidu, Clive Mendus, Tamzin Griffin, Richard Katz, Ben Meyjes, Craig Parkinson, Steven Crossley, Naomi Frederick, Kostas Philippoglou, Jamie Bradley, Katie Jones, Anamaria Marinca, Johannes Flaschberger	
2008	A Disappearing Number	Simon McBurney	"The Company'"	Design: Michael Levine, Lighting: Paul Anderson, Sound: Christopher Shutt, Costume: Christina Cunningham, Projection: Sven Ortel	David Annen, Firdous Bamji, Paul Bhattacharjee, Hiren Chate, Divya Kasturi, Chetna Pandya, Saskia Reeves and Shane Shambhu	2008 Best New Play - The Laurence Olivier Awards, 2007 Best Play - Evening Standard Awards, 2007 Best New Play - The Critics' Circle Theatre Awards
2008	Shun-kin 春琴	Simon McBurney	Based on the writings of Jun'ichiro Tanizaki, Script Edited by Jo Allan	Design: Merle Hensel and Rumi Matsui Lighting: Paul Anderson, Sound: Gareth Fry, Costume: Christina Cunningham, Projection: Finn Ross	Kaho Aso, Songha Cho, Eri Fukatsu, Honjoh Hidetaro, Kentaro Mizuki, Yasuyo Mochizuki, Yuko Miyamoto, Keitoku Takada, Ryoko Tateishi, Yoshi Oida	2009 Yomiuri Theatre Awards Grand Prize Award for Best Director (Simon McBurney), Nominated for Best Play and Best Female Actor (Eri Fukatsu)
2008	A Disappearing Number (revival)	Simon McBurney	"The Company"	Design: Michael Levine, Lighting: Paul Anderson, Sound: Christopher Shutt, Costume: Christina Cunningham, Projection: Sven Ortel	David Annen, Firdous Bamji, Paul Bhattacharjee, Hiren Chate, Divya Kasturi, Chetna Pandya, Saskia Reeves and Shane Shambhu	
2009	Shun-kin 春琴 (revival)	Simon McBurney	Based on the writings of Jun'ichiro Tanizaki, Script Edited by Jo Allan	Design: Merle Hensel and Rumi Matsui Lighting: Paul Anderson, Sound: Gareth Fry, Costume: Christina Cunningham, Projection: Finn Ross	Kaho Aso, Songha Cho, Eri Fukatsu, Honjoh Hidetaro, Kentaro Mizuki, Yasuyo Mochizuki, Nigoshichi Shimouma, Keitoku Takada, Ryoko Tateishi, Junko Uchida. Puppetry by Blind Summit	2009 Yomiuri Theatre Awards Grand Prize Award for Best Director (Simon McBurney), Nominated for Best Play and Best Female Actor (Eri Fukatsu)
2009	Endgame	Simon McBurney	Samuel Beckett	Design: Tim Hatley, Lighting: Paul Anderson, Sound: Gareth Fry, Costume: Christina Cunningham	Simon McBurney, Miriam Margolyes, Tom Hickey, Mark Rylance	2009 What's on Stage Awards, Best Supporting Actress in a Play (Miriam Margolyes)
2010	A Disappearing Number (revival)	Simon McBurney	"The Company"	Design: Michael Levine, Lighting: Paul Anderson, Sound: Christopher Shutt, Costume: Christina Cunningham, Projection: Sven Ortel	Firdous Bamji, Saskia Reeves, Paul Bhattacharjee, Hiren Chate, Shane Shambhu, Divya Kasturi, Chetna Pandya, David Annen	
2010	Shun-kin 春琴 (revival)	Simon McBurney	Based on the writings of Jun'ichiro Tanizaki, Script Edited by Jo Allan	Design: Merle Hensel and Rumi Matsui Lighting: Paul Anderson, Sound: Gareth Fry, Costume: Christina Cunningham, Projection: Finn Ross	Kaho Aso, Songha Cho, Eri Fukatsu, Honjoh Hidetaro, Kentaro Mizuki, Yasuyo Mochizuki, Yoshi Oida, Keitoku Takada, Ryoko Tateishi, Junko Uchida. Puppetry by Blind Summit	
2010	A Dog's Heart	Simon McBurney	Libretto by Cesare Mazzonis after the novel by Mikhail Bulgakov	Design: Michael Levine, Lighting: Paul Anderson, Costume: Christina Cunningham, Projection: Finn Ross	Produced with De Nederlandse Opera and ENO. Puppetry by Blind Summit	2010 Nominated, Best New Opera Production - The Laurence Olivier Awards
2011	The Master and Margarita	Simon McBurney	Based on the novel by Mikhail Bulgakov, text by Simon McBurney, the company and Edward Kemp	Set Design: Es Devlin, Lighting: Paul Anderson, Sound: Gareth Fry, Costume: Christina Cunningham, Video Design: Finn Ross, 3D Animation Luke Halls, Puppetry Blind Summit Theatre	David Annen, Thomas Arnold, Josie Daxter, Johannes Flaschberger, Tamzin Griffin, Amanda Hadingue, Richard Katz, Sinéad Matthews, Clive Mendus, Yasuyo Mochizuki, Tim McMullan, Ajay Naidu, Henry Pettigrew, Paul Rhys, Cesar Sarachu, Angus Wright	
2012	Die Zauberflöte	Simon McBurney	Mozart	Set Design: Michael Levine, Lighting: Jean Kalman, Sound: Gareth Fry, Costume: Nicky Gilibrand, Video: Finn Ross	Produced with De Nederlandse Opera and ENO.	
2013	Lionboy	Annabel Arden	From the novels by Zizou Corder, adapted by Marcelo Dos Santos with the company		Adetomiwa Edun, Victoria Gould, Rob Gilbert, Lisa Kerr, Femi Elufowoju Jr, Dan Milne, Clive Mendus, Stephen Hiscock	
2015	The Encounter	Simon McBurney and Kirsty Housley	Inspired by the book 'Amazon Beaming' by Petru Popescu	Design: Michael Levine, Sound: Gareth Fry with Pete Malkin, Lighting: Paul Anderson, Projection: Will Duke, Associate director: Jemima James	Simon McBurney, Richard Katz	
2015	Beware of Pity	Simon McBurney and James Yeatman	Based on the novel Ungeduld des Herzens (Beware of Pity) by Stefan Zweig.	Set design: Anna Fleischle, Costumes: Holly Waddington, Lighting: Paul Anderson, Sound: Pete Malkin, Sound associate: Benjamin Grant, Video: Will Duke, Dramaturg: Maja Zade	Robert Beyer, Marie Burchard, Johannes Flaschberger, Christoph Gawenda, Moritz Gottwald, Laurenz Laufenberg, Eva Meckbach A co-production with the Schaubühne.	
2016	A Pacifist's Guide to the War on Cancer	Bryony Kimmings	A new musical about cancer.	Book: Bryony Kimmings and Brian Lobel, Music: Tom Parkinson, Lyrics: Bryony Kimmings, Direction: Bryony Kimmings, Set: Lucy Osborne, Costume: Christina Cunningham, Choreography: Lizzi Gee, Music Director: Marc Tritschler, Lighting: Paul Anderson, Sound: Lewis Gibson, Assistant Director: Debbie Hannan	Company: Naana Agyei-Ampadu, Amy Booth-Steel, Jenny Fitzpatrick, Hal Fowler, Amanda Hadingue, Francesca Mills, Golda Rosheuvel, Max Runham, Rose Shalloo, Gareth Snook, Lottie Vallis, Gary Wood, Band: Oroh Angiama, Jon Gingell, Phil Gould, Marc Tritschler, Elizabeth Westcott	
2017	The Kid Stays in the Picture	Simon McBurney & James Yeatman	"The Company"	Anna Fleischle	Thomas Arnold, Heather Burns, Christian Camargo, Max Casella, Clint Dyer, Danny Huston, Ajay Naidu, Madeleine Potter	
2022	Drive Your Plow Over the Bones of the Dead	Simon McBurney & Kirsty Housley	Based on the novel by Olga Tokarczuk, translated to English by Antonia Lloyd-Jones	Set & Costume: Rae Smith, Lighting: Paule Constable, Sound: Christopher Shutt, Video: Dick Straker, Dramaturgy: Laurence Cook & Sian Ejiwunmi-Le Barre, Movement: Crystal Pite & Toby Sedwick, Music: Richard Skelton	Thomas Arnold, Johannes Flaschberger, Amanda Hadingue, Kathryn Hunter, Kiren Kebaili-Dwyer, Weronika Maria, Tim McMullan, Cesar Saraschu, Sophie Steer, Alexander Uzoka	
2024	Mnemonic (revival)	Simon McBurney	"The Company"	Design: Michael Levine, Lighting: Paul Anderson, Sound: Christopher Shutt, Costume: Christina Cunningham, Video: Roland Hovarth for rocafilm	Khalid Abdalla, Hisham Abdel Razek, Thomas Arnold, Richard Katz, Laurenz Laufenberg, Tim McMullan, Kostas Philippoglou, Sarah Slimani, Sophie Steer, Eileen Walsh, Arthur Wilson	
