= McBurnie =

McBurnie is a surname. Notable people with the surname include:

- Beryl McBurnie (1913–2000), Trinidadian dancer
- Oli McBurnie (born 1996), Scottish footballer
- Sophie McBurnie (born 1999), known as Piri, one half of Piri & Tommy

== See also ==
- McBurney (surname)
- McBurnie Coachcraft, an American bodywork company
