= McBurney =

McBurney may refer to:

- McBurney (surname)
- McBurney's point, medical sign
- McBurney School, defunct high school in New York City
