= Shunkinsho =

Shunkinsho is the name of:

- Shunkinshō (novella), by Jun'ichirō Tanizaki (谷崎潤一郎), concerning the lifelong love affair of a blind aristocratic musician and her retainer/pupil/partner in obsession husband. A classic Tanizaki exploration of obsession and lust, complete with sadomasochistic elements.
- Shunkinshō (film), a Japanese film based on the story
- Shunkinshō (opera), based on the story
