= Orango (Shostakovich) =

Unfinished opera by Dmitri Shostakovich

Orango is an unfinished satirical opera sketched in 1932 by Dmitri Shostakovich. The manuscript was found by Olga Digonskaya, a Russian musicologist, in the Glinka Museum, Moscow in 2004. The plan was for a prologue and three acts but only about a quarter of the Prologue was sketched.

The libretto was written by Aleksey Nikolayevich Tolstoy and Alexander Osipovich Starchakov. Since Orango is the protagonist of the opera, half-ape and half-man, one of the sources of inspiration for the libretto was the work of Russian biologist, Ilya Ivanovich Ivanov who attempted hybridization of humans and other primates. According to Gerard McBurney, the word suggests orangutan. Shostakovich had visited Ivanov's primate research station in Sukhumi and "recommended it as a sight worth seeing."

The Prologue was first performed in an orchestration by Gerard McBurney on 2 December 2011 in Los Angeles by the Los Angeles Philharmonic conducted by Esa-Pekka Salonen and staged by Peter Sellars.

The piece was also performed by the Philharmonia Orchestra on 24 August 2015 at the Royal Albert Hall as part of the 2015 BBC Proms, again conducted by Salonen. Irina Brown was stage director.

== 1932 commission ==
The Bolshoi Theatre commissioned the opera in 1932 intending it as a celebration of the 15th anniversary of the October Revolution. Alexei Tolstoy and Alexander Starchakov were engaged as librettists to work with Shostakovich and given the broad theme "'human growth during revolution and socialist construction.' Ultimately, the collaborators conceived their opera as 'a political lampoon against the bourgeois press,' adapting the plot from one of Starchakov's stories concerning a human-ape hybrid conceived in a medical experiment."

When the librettists failed to deliver on schedule, Shostakovich, who was busy in the midst of composing Lady Macbeth of the Mtsensk District, deferred and then abandoned the project, discarding his draft. Starchakov was arrested in 1936 and shot in 1937 during the Great Purge.

== 2004 discovery ==
Russian musicologist Olga Digonskaya was working with Irina Shostakovich, the composer's third wife and widow, on Shostakovich's catalogue. In December 2004, at the Glinka State Central Museum of Musical Culture, Moscow, Digonskaya discovered a cardboard file containing some "300 pages of musical sketches, pieces and scores" by the hand of Shostakovich. "A composer friend bribed Shostakovich's housemaid to regularly deliver the contents of Shostakovich's office waste bin to him, instead of taking it to the garbage. Some of those cast-offs eventually found their way into the Glinka. ... The Glinka archive 'contained a huge number of pieces and compositions which were completely unknown or could be traced quite indirectly,' Digonskaya said."

Among the discoveries were seven sheets, six written on both sides, which comprise the thirteen pages of Orango to survive: the Prologue, amounting to about forty minutes of music scored for piano with the vocal parts written above. The piano score was published in Moscow in 2010 with a scholarly introduction by Digonskaya.

== McBurney orchestration ==
Irina Shostakovich asked British composer Gerard McBurney to orchestrate a score from the piano sketches. This work was premiered by the Los Angeles Philharmonic on 2 December 2011.

Artist	Role	
Los Angeles Philharmonic		
Esa-Pekka Salonen		conductor
Peter Sellars		director
Ben Zamora		lighting designer
Eugene Brancoveanu	Orango	baritone
Ryan McKinny	Veselchak	bass-baritone
Jordan Bisch	Voice from the Crowd/Bass	bass
Michael Fabiano	Zoologist	tenor
Yulia Van Doren	Susanna	soprano
Timur Bekbosunov	Paul Mash	tenor
Los Angeles Master Chorale; Grant Gershon		music director
