= South Tyrol Museum of Archaeology =

Coordinates: 46°29′59.53″N 11°20′58.31″E

- Südtiroler Archäologiemuseum
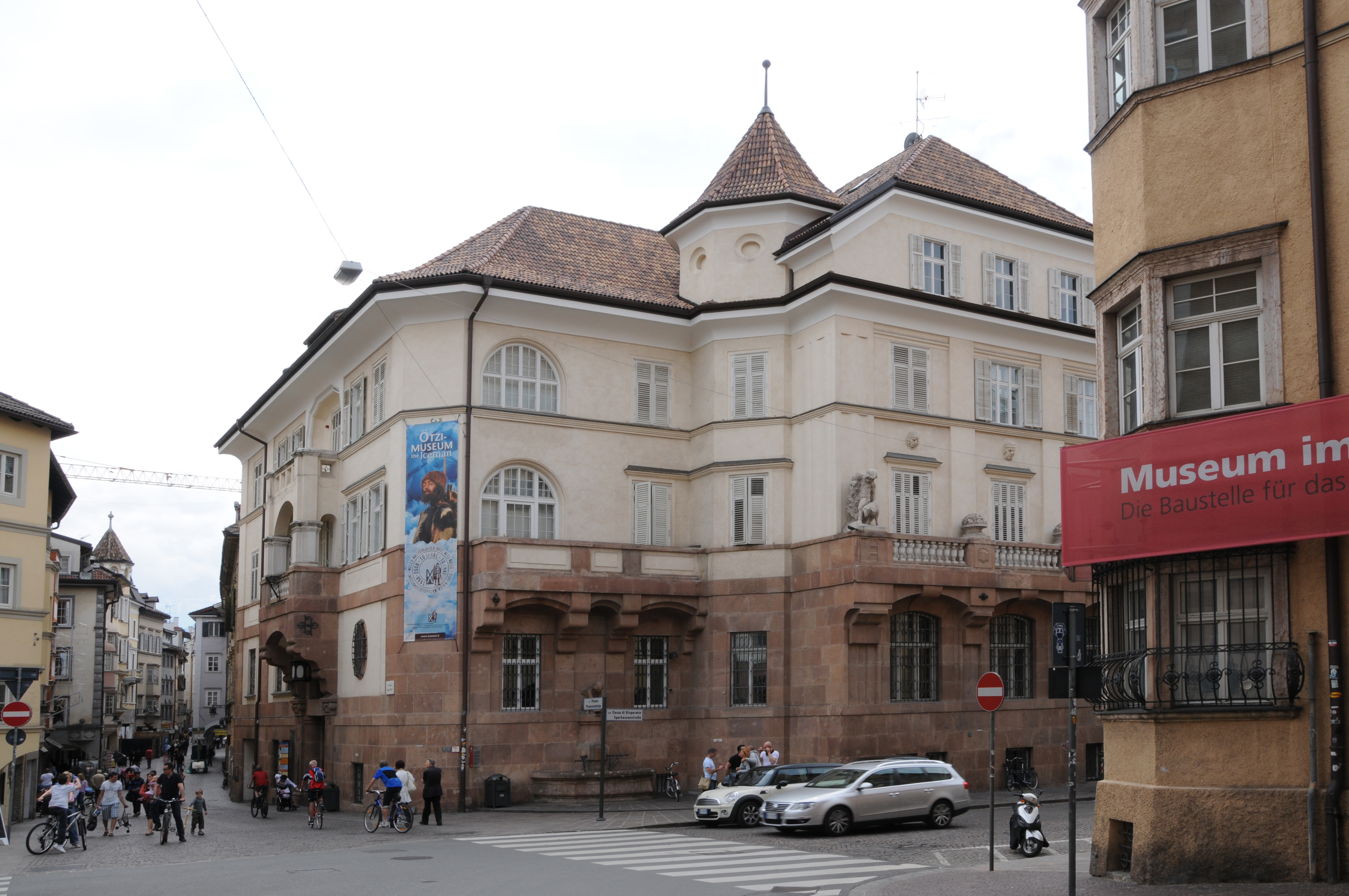
- South Tyrol Museum of Archaeology
- Established: 1998
- Location: Bolzano, South Tyrol, Italy
- Type: Archaeological museum
- Website: Official Website

South Tyrol Museum of Archaeology (German: Südtiroler Archäologiemuseum; Italian: Museo archeologico dell'Alto Adige) is an archaeological museum in the city of Bolzano, South Tyrol, Italy. It is the home of the preserved body of Ötzi the Iceman.

== History ==
The museum was specifically established in 1998 to house "Ötzi", a well-preserved natural mummy of a man from about 3300 BC (53 centuries ago). This is the world's oldest natural human mummy, a wet mummy, as opposed to mummies preserved by dry conditions in a desert environment. It has offered an unprecedented view of Chalcolithic (Copper Age) European culture. The world's oldest complete copper age axe was found among his extensive equipment, which also comprised a rather complex fire-lighting kit and a quiver loaded with 12 arrows, only two of which were finished, clothing, and a flint knife complete with its sheath.

The body is held in a climate-controlled chamber within the museum at a temperature of -6 °Celsius and 98% humidity, replicating glacier conditions in which it was found. Along with original finds, models, reconstructions, and multimedia presentations show Ötzi in the context of the early history of the southern Alpine region.

Converted from the former branch building of the Austro-Hungarian Bank, the museum covers the history and archaeology of the southern Alpine region from the Palaeolithic and Mesolithic (15,000 BC) up to 800 AD. In 2006, the museum hosted an exhibition on the mummies of the Chachapoyas culture.
