= Klaus Oeggl =

Austrian botanist

- Born: Innsbruck, Austria
- Known for: Studies on "Oetzi"
- Scientific career
- Fields: Archaeobotany
- Workplaces: University of Innsbruck

Klaus Oeggl (born 1955) is a retired Austrian botanist, and deals with palaeoecology and archaeobotany. He is well known for his studies on the life-circumstances and on the environment of the Neolithic glacier mummy "Ötzi".

== Life ==
Klaus Oeggl studied biology and Earth sciences at the University of Innsbruck, where he graduated in 1981. In 1987 he obtained his doctorate in botany. Between 1982 and 1983 Klaus Oeggl taught at secondary schools. In 1983 he changed to Innsbruck University, where he started as lector at the Institute of Botany first. Then followed employments as university assistant of Sigmar Bortenschlager at this institute. In 1997 he became associate professor. Since 2011 he was holding a professorship of palynology and archaeobotany, leading the research group of the same name at the Institute of Botany. He retired in 2020. In the context of his teaching activities he was guest lecturer at the University of Bergen, guest professor at the Suranaree University of Technology in Thailand and at the Free University of Bozen-Bolzano.

== Scientific contribution ==
Oeggl is engaged in the interaction between man and plants in the past. His studies range from the dispersal of crops, the diet and agriculture of prehistoric men, the reconstruction of the vegetation and environment in the surroundings of prehistoric settlements to the emergence of the recent cultural landscape in the Alps. In his work Oeggl pursues a multi- and interdisciplinary research approach with archaeological and scientific disciplines, because the genesis of cultural landscapes and the development of the recent vegetation cover is subject to multifactorial abiotic and biotic processes. His preferred applied methods are pollen analyses, plant macro-remain analysis and geochemistry providing the basis for hypothesis-tests and model-validation. He is known for his studies on the life-circumstances of the Neolithic Iceman "Ötzi". More recently he scrutinized the paleoecological and socio-economic impact of ancient mining in the Alps in the research center HiMAT of Innsbruck University. Oeggl expedited his studies in 45 research projects supported by the EU, Austrian Science Foundation, museums and communities.

== Publications ==
- Oeggl K. & U. Eicher 1989: Pollen- and oxygen-isotope analyses of late- and postglacial sediments from the Schwemm raised bog near Walchsee in Tirol, Austria. Boreas, 18: 245 - 253
- Oeggl K. 1992: Sediment- und Makrofossilanalysen aus dem Lanser See in Tirol (Austria): Ein Beitrag zur spätglazialen Bio- und Chronostratigraphie der Ostalpen. Flora, 186: 43 - 62.
- Oeggl K. & N. Wahlmüller 1994: The Environment of a High Alpine Mesolithic Camp Site in Austria. American Association of Stratigraphic Palynologists, Contribution Series, 29:147 - 160
- Oeggl K. 1998: Palynologische Untersuchungen aus dem Bereich des römischen Bohlenweges bei Lermoos, Tirol. In: Walde E. (ed): Via Claudia. Neue Forschungen. Institut für Klassische Archäologie der Leopold-Franzens-Universität Innsbruck: 147 – 171
- Dickson J.H., Oeggl K., Holden T. G., Handley L. L., O´Connell T. C. & Preston T. 2000: The Omnivorous Tyrolean Iceman: Colon Contents (Meat, Cereals, Pollen, Moss and Whipworm) and Stable Isotope Analyses. Phil. Trans. R. Society London B 355: 1843–1849
- Oeggl K. & Unterfrauner S. 2000: Die Pflanzengroßreste des Riss/Würm-Interglazials und des Würmglazials von Mondsee. Mitteilungen der Kommission für Quartärfoschung 12: 93 – 121
- Schmidl A., Kofler W., Notburga Oeggl-Wahlmüller & Oeggl K. 2005: Land use in the Eastern Alps during the Bronze Age – An archaeobotanical case study of a hill-top settlement in the Montafon (Western Austria). Archaeometry, 47: 455 – 470
- Schmidl A. & Oeggl K. 2005: Subsistence strategies of two hilltop settlements in the Eastern Alps - Friaga/Bartholomäberg (Vorarlberg, Austria) and Ganglegg/Schluderns (South Tyrol, Italy). Vegetation History & Archaeobotany, 14: 303 - 312
- Schmidl A., Jacomet S., Oeggl K. (2007): Distribution patterns of cultivated plants in the Eastern Alps (Central Europe) during Iron Age. - Journal of Archaeological Science, 34, 243-254
- Oeggl K., Kofler W., Schmidl A., Dickson J.H., Egarter-Vigl E., Gaber O. 2007: The reconstruction of the last itinerary of "Ötzi", the Neolithic Iceman, by pollen analyses from sequentially sampled gut extracts. Quaternary Science Reviews 26: 853 - 861
- Oeggl K. (2009): The significance of the Tyrolean Iceman for the Archaeobotany of Central Europe. Vegetation History & Archaeobotany, 18: 1 - 11. DOI: 10.1007/s00334-008-0186-2
- Heiss A. & Oeggl K. (2009): The plant remains from the Iceman´s find spot – new results on the glacier mummy´s environment. Vegetation History & Archaeobotany, 18: 23 - 35.
- Oeggl K., Schmidl A., Kolfer W., (2009): Origin and seasonality of subfossil dung from the Iceman´s discovery site (Eastern Alps). Vegetation History & Archaeobotany, 18: 37 - 46.
- Oeggl K. & Nicolussi K. 2009: Prähistorische Besiedlung von zentralen Alpentälern in Bezug zur Klimaentwicklung. in: Schmid R., Matulla C., Psenner R. (eds.): Klimawandel in Österreich. Die letzten 20 000 Jahre ….und ein Blick voraus. Innsbruck university press. alpine space – man and environment: vol. 6: 77 – 86
- Oeggl K. 2009: Die Paläoökologie des historischen und prähistorischen Bergbaus in den Ostalpen. Berichte der Reinhold Tüxen-Gesellschaft, 21: 241 – 252
- Breitenlechner, E.; Hilber, M.; Lutz, J.; Kathrein, Y.; Unterkircher, A.; Oeggl, K. 2010: The impact of mining activities on the environment reflected by pollen, charcoal and geochemical analyses. Journal of Archaeological Science 37: 1458–1467
- Festi D., Tecchiat U., Steiner H., Oeggl K. 2011: The Late Neolithic settlement of Latsch, northern Italy: subsistence of a settlement contemporary with the Alpine Iceman, and located in his valley of origin. Vegetation History & Archaeobotany 20: 367 – 379
- Schibler J., Breitenlechner E., Deschler-Erb S., Goldenberg G., Hanke K., Hiebel G., Hüster Plogmann H., Nicolussi K., Marti-Grädel E., Pichler S., Schmidl A., Schwarz S., Stopp B. & Oeggl K. 2011: Miners and mining in the Late Bronze Age: a multidisciplinary study from Austria. Antiquity 85: 1259–1278
- Schwarz A. S., Krause R. Oeggl K. 2013: Anthracological analysis from a mining site in the Eastern Alps to evaluate woodland uses during the Bronze Age. BAR International Series 2486: 241 – 250
- Breitenlechner E., Goldenberg G., Lutz J., Oeggl K. 2013: The impact of prehistoric mining activities on the environment: a multidisciplinary study at the fen Schwarzenbergmoos (Brixlegg, Tyrol, Austria). Vegetation History & Archaeobotany. 22: 351 - 366
- Behre K.-E. & Oeggl K. 1996 (eds.): Early Farming in the Old World. Recent Advances in Archaeobotanical Research. Special Volume of Vegetation History & Archaeobotany. Springer Berlin Heidelberg
- Bortenschlager S. & Oeggl K. (eds.) 2000: The Iceman and his natural environment. The Man in the Ice Vol. 4. Springer Verlag, Wien - New York
- Anreiter, P.; Goldenberg, G.; Hanke, K.; Krause, R.; Leitner, W.; Mathis, F.; Nicolussi, K.; Oeggl, K.; Pernicka, E.; Prast, M.; Schibler, J.; Schneider, I.; Stadler, H.; Stöllner, T.; Tomedi, G.; Tropper, P. (eds) 2010: Mining in European History and its Impact on Environment and Human Societies. Proceedings for the 1st Mining in European History-Conference of the SFB HiMAT (12.-15.11.2009, Innsbruck). innsbruck university press.
- Goldenberg G., Töchterle U., Oeggl K. & Krenn-Leeb A. (eds) 2011: Forschungsprogramm HiMAT. Neues zur Bergbaugeschichte der Ostalpen. Archäologie Österreichs Spezial 4
