= A Disappearing Number =

Play by Simon McBurney

- Original language: English
- Written by: Simon McBurney
- Subject: Two very smart guys ponder 1 + 2 + 3 + ...
- Genre: Drama
- Setting: 1910s and current era

Premiere
- Date: March 2007
- Place: Theatre Royal, Plymouth England
- www.complicite.org/work/a-disappearing-number/

A Disappearing Number is a 2007 play co-written and devised by the Théâtre de Complicité company and directed and conceived by English playwright Simon McBurney. It was inspired by the collaboration during the 1910s between the pure mathematicians Srinivasa Ramanujan from India, and the Cambridge University don G.H. Hardy.

It was a co-production between the UK-based theatre company Complicite and Theatre Royal, Plymouth, and Ruhrfestspiele, Wiener Festwochen, and the Holland Festival. A Disappearing Number premiered in Plymouth in March 2007, toured internationally, and played at The Barbican Centre in Autumn 2007 and 2008 and at Lincoln Center in July 2010. It was directed by Simon McBurney with music by Nitin Sawhney. The production is 110 minutes with no intermission.

The piece was co-devised and written by the cast and company. The cast in order of appearance: Firdous Bamji, Saskia Reeves, David Annen, Paul Bhattacharjee, Shane Shambu, Divya Kasturi and Chetna Pandya.

== Plot ==
Ramanujan first attracted Hardy's attention by writing him a letter in which he proved that

$$1+2+3+\cdots = -\frac{1}{12}\ (\Re)$$

where the notation $(\Re)$ indicates a Ramanujan summation.

Hardy realised that this confusing presentation of the series 1 + 2 + 3 + 4 + ⋯ was an application of the Riemann zeta function $\zeta(s)$ with $s=-1$. Ramanujan's work became one of the foundations of bosonic string theory, a precursor of modern string theory.

The play includes live tabla playing, which "morphs seductively into pure mathematics", as the Financial Times review put it, "especially when ... its rhythms shade into chants of number sequences reminiscent of the libretto to Philip Glass's Einstein on the Beach. One can hear the beauty of the sequences without grasping the rules that govern them."

The play has two strands of narrative and presents strong visual and physical theatre. It interweaves the passionate intellectual relationship between Hardy and the more intuitive Ramanujan, with the present-day story of Ruth, an English maths lecturer, and her husband, Al Cooper, a globe-trotting Indian-American businessman "to illuminate the beauty and the patterns – the mystery – of mathematics." It also explores the nature and spirituality of infinity, and explores several aspects of the Indian diaspora.

Ruth travels to India in Ramanujan's footsteps and eventually dies. Al follows, to get closer to her ghost. Meanwhile, 100 years previously, Ramanujan is travelling in the opposite direction, making the trip to England, where he works with Hardy on maths and contracts tuberculosis. Partition (as a maths concept) is explored, and diverging and converging series in mathematics become a metaphor for the Indian diaspora.

== Awards and nominations ==
- 2007 Critics' Circle Theatre Award for Best New Play
- 2007 Evening Standard Award for Best Play
- 2007 Laurence Olivier Award for Best New Play
