= Konrad Spindler =

German archaeologist and prehistorian (1939-2005)

- Born: June 6, 1939; Leipzig, Germany
- Died: April 17, 2005 (aged 65)
- Education: University of Münster, University of Freiburg
- Known for: Study of Ötzi the Iceman
- Notable work: Der Mann im Eis (The Man in the Ice)
- Scientific career
- Fields: Archaeology, Prehistory
- Workplaces: University of Innsbruck

In his later years, Spindler continued to work on prehistoric studies and wrote several books on archaeology. His book Der Mann im Eis (The Man in the Ice) became a widely referenced work on the Ötzi discovery. He remained active in the field until his passing in 2005.

Spindler's role in the Ötzi research was later referenced in popular culture, including in the play Mnemonic.

== Selected works ==
- Spindler, Konrad. Der Mann im Eis. München: C. Bertelsmann, 1993. ISBN 9783570006272.
- Spindler, Konrad. The Man in the Ice: The Discovery of a 5,000-Year-Old Body Reveals the Secrets of the Stone Age. London: Weidenfeld & Nicolson, 1994. ISBN 9780297814445.
- Spindler, Konrad. Ötzi: Der Mann aus dem Eis. München: Piper Verlag, 2001. ISBN 9783492235371.
