= Mnemonic (play) =

1999 play written by Complicité

- Original language: English
- Written by: Complicité
- Subject: Memory
- Genre: Postmodern
- Setting: Various locations across Europe

Premiere
- Date: July 1999, revived in revised versions, 2001, 2002 and 2024
- Place: Lawrence Batley Theatre, Huddersfield (first version); Royal National Theatre, London (2001 revival); Bosnian National Theatre, Sarajevo (2002 revival); Royal National Theatre, London (2024 revival)

Mnemonic is a play created by the British theatre company Complicité. It uses several interrelated stories to explore the subject of memory.

== Synopsis ==
Mnemonic opens with a meta-theatrical lecture inviting the audience to reflect on memory. It then tells two parallel stories: in one, a man named Virgil tries to find his girlfriend, Alice, who has run away to Europe to hunt for her long-lost father; the other relates the discovery of Ötzi the Iceman, a 5,000-year-old mummified corpse. Through recurring images and situations the play draws parallels between these stories, focusing on the theme of the role of the imagination in recapturing the past.

== Characters ==
- Simon/Virgil/Ötzi: Initially appears as “Simon”, the play’s self-aware director figure, but after an introductory monologue, takes on the role of Virgil. Virgil is a British man grappling with the sudden disappearance of his girlfriend, Alice. As the play unfolds, he sets out across Europe to search for and reconnect with her. At times, Virgil’s character visually or symbolically mirrors the ancient Iceman Ötzi from the parallel storyline.
- Alice: Virgil’s girlfriend, who has left him and is travelling through Europe to search for her long-lost father. Her journey becomes both personal and archaeological, linking her to themes of memory, identity, and ancestry.
- Spindler: Based on real-life archaeologist Konrad Spindler, this is the main professor conducting research into the recently discovered ice-man.
- Simonides: Named after the creator of mnemonics, Simonides of Ceos, he is a migrant taxi-driver who throughout the play talks about the never-ending economic migration in Europe.
- BBC Man: A BBC journalist Alice meets on a train during her travels. He introduces her to Jewish history and culture, and suggests that her father may have had Jewish ancestry. It is implied they may form a brief romantic connection, though this is left ambiguous and may reflect Virgil’s imagination rather than objective reality.
