= Bryony Kimmings =

British live artist

- Born: 30 March 1981 (age 45)
- Education: Brunel University
- Known for: Performance art

Bryony Kimmings (born 30 March 1981) is a British live artist based in London and Cambridgeshire. She is an associate artist of the Soho Theatre, and, in 2016, was commissioned to write The Pacifist's Guide to the War on Cancer for Complicité Associates.

She creates multi-platform art works to provoke change. Her work centres mostly around "social experiments", which in the past have included the artist retracing a sexually transmitted infection to its source, spending seven days in a controlled environment in a constant state of intoxication and becoming a pop star invented by a nine-year-old.

== Early career ==
Kimmings graduated with a degree in Modern Drama from Brunel University in 2003. In a 2011 interview she said of her time at Brunel: "It was Live Art and the history of performance artists that excited me the most", and so immediately afterwards she established the company 'Glass Eyed' with friends. 'Glass Eyed' created work for two years before being dissolved.

In 2006 she began Celebrityville a soap cabaret following the lives of forgotten celebrities living in a fictional town. A new episode was created every month between 2006 and 2008. Describing working on Celebrityville Kimmings said "this gave me a baptism of fire really, making such a large volume of work, learning about how to run a night, what to do if things broke half way through, making costumes, doing marketing - everything." When Celebrityville ended, Kimmings began to explore a solo live art career with autobiographical themes.

== Shows ==
=== Select performance work ===
- I'm a Phoenix, Bitch (2018). Premiered at the Battersea Arts Centre. This piece can be viewed as a subversive feminist musical piece, with elements of a pop-video, horror film, art installation and therapy session.
- Fake it ‘til you Make it (2015). Premiered at the Traverse Theatre, Edinburgh. This piece centres around the story of Bryony's then fiancé, Tim Grayburn, and his battle with his chronic depression. The performance is also highlighting the taboo of mental health and what is not spoken about within society.
- That Catherine Bennett Show (2014). Premiered at the Southbank Centre, London.
- Credible Likeable Superstar Role Model (2013). Premiered at the Pleasance Dome, Edinburgh. This show explores Kimmings personal relationship with sex and alcohol.
- Heartache.Heartbreak. (2012).
- Kablooey! (2012). Premiered at Battersea Arts Centre, London. This performance is a ten-minute piece that was made for people at a time, both adults and children.
- Mummy Time (2011). Premiered at The Junction, Cambridge. This is a ten-minute piece that has been described as a high octane, funny and ultimately moving 1-to-1 experience for festivals.
- 7 Day Drunk (2011). This performance has a two-part song and dance routine which is about Kimmings and her rocky relationship with alcohol while investigating the historical links between artists and mind enhancing drugs.
- Sex Idiot (2010) Awards: Best Emerging Artist, Total Theatre Award 2010, The West Australian Arts Editor Award 2015, Best Comedy, Adelaide Fringe Weekly Award 2015, Best Comedy Award, The Advertiser Adelaide 2015.
- A Pacifist's Guide to the War on Cancer (2016). This is a musical performed as a whistle-stop tour through five unconventional stories about cancer.

=== As playwright ===
- A Pacifist's Guide to the War on Cancer (2016). Book by Bryony Kimmings and Brian Lobel. Lyrics by Kimmings. Co-Produced by Approach Complicité Associates and National Theatre.
- The Boys Project (2017). A performance created by Kimmings which engaged young men from council estates all over the UK, including Leeds, Cardiff, Peterborough, Birmingham, Manchester and London. It was a long term art and activism project which exploded media stereotypes and the political marginalisation of the young.

=== As screenwriter ===
- Last Christmas (2019). Co-screenwriter with Emma Thompson. A romantic comedy film directed by Paul Feig, inspired by the Wham! song "Last Christmas".
- The Rapture (2026). Co-written with Rebecca Manley; adapted from the book of the same name by Liz Jensen. A five-part apocalyptic psychological thriller broadcast on BBC One.

== Approach ==
Known primarily for creating autobiographical work, Kimmings achieved notoriety with her 2010 piece Sex Idiot. In it, she revealed her sexual and her romantic history after discovering she had contracted an STI and told of the quest to find out which of her former partners had given it on to her. She toured this show until 2015. In her 2011 piece 7 Day Drunk Kimmings collaborated with a team of scientists to analyse the impact of alcohol on her creativity.

In an interview in March 2011, speaking of the drivers behind her work Kimmings said: "I guess in a way it is an artist's duty to say and explore the things that are untouchable, or hard to talk about."

In a 2012 interview for Pulse Fringe Festival, Kimmings introduces herself as "an artist who makes autobiographical work" she continues to say her work "always follows a kind of autobiographical experiment that I go on." Her profile on the British Council of Drama and Dance website says: "Bryony works autobiographically and begins the development of her work with a social experiment. She is inspired by the taboos and anomalies of British culture and her work promotes the airing of her own dirty laundry to oil conversations on seemingly difficult subjects."

== Personal life ==
Kimmings was born in Huntingdon and grew up in St Ives, Cambridgeshire, attending St Ivo School. She has an older sister, whose then 9-year-old daughter inspired her to develop her 2013 show Credible Likeable Superstar Role Model.

In November 2015, Kimmings gave birth to her son Frank. The boy's father was her fiancé at the time, Tim Grayburn. Frank was diagnosed with West Syndrome, a form of epilepsy, soon after he was born. In her 2018 show I'm a Phoenix, Bitch, Kimmings processed how she experienced post-natal depression, had a severely ill infant and went through a break-up all in one year.

== Awards ==
=== Sex Idiot ===
- Total Theatre Award 2010
- Listed in Time Out magazine's Best of the Year (2010) – off-West End and Fringe Theatre category
- West Australian Arts Editor Award 2015
- The Advertiser Best Comedy Award, Adelaide Fringe Festival 2015

=== Fake it ‘til you Make it ===
- Best Theatre Award, Fringe World Perth 2015
- Best Theatre Award, Adelaide Fringe Festival 2015
- Herald Angel Award, Edinburgh Fringe Festivatl 2015
- Short-listed for the Amnesty Freedom of Expression Award, Edinburgh Fringe Festival 2015
