= Charles McBurney (archaeologist) =

American archaeologist

Charles Brian Montagu McBurney (18 June 1914 – 14 December 1979) was a British-American archaeologist who spent most of his working life in England.

== Early life and education ==
McBurney was born in Stockbridge, Massachusetts, the son of Dorothy Lillian (Rundall) and Henry McBurney, and the grandson of Charles McBurney, the American surgeon (known to subsequent generations of surgeons for defining McBurney's point). His mother was English, the daughter and granddaughter of British Army officers; his father was an American engineer. He spent his childhood in the USA until he was eleven, then his parents took him to London, and then to Switzerland, and France. Young McBurney was home schooled.

In 1933, he entered King's College, Cambridge, reading French and German, and then archaeology and anthropology. He studied archaeology under Miles Burkett and Dorothy Garrod, who greatly influenced his career. Graduate studies were interrupted by war service in the Royal Air Force Volunteer Reserve. But during World War II he was stationed in North Africa and undertook archaeological surveys in the Western Desert, finding numerous archaeological sites he would later excavate. He completed his PhD in 1948. His PhD dissertation was one of the first comparative studies of the late Middle Palaeolithic of Europe.

== Career ==
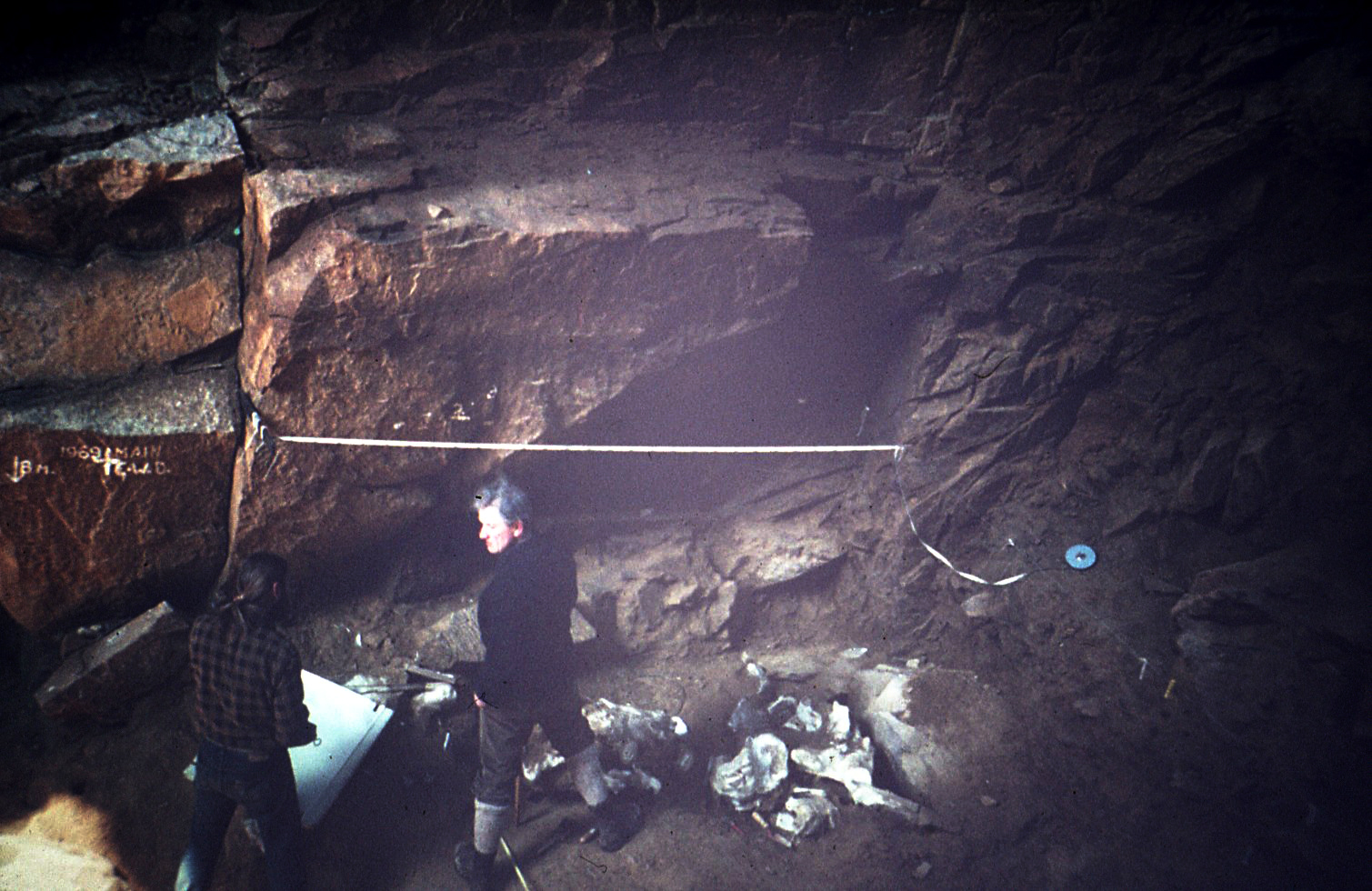
Charles McBurney mapping Layer 3 bone bed at La Cotte de St Brelade in 1976.

In 1952, he started as a lecturer in archaeology at Cambridge, and later Reader and finally Professor of Quaternary Prehistory at Corpus Christi College, Cambridge. His work included studies of the Upper Palaeolithic in Britain, important excavations at La Cotte de St Brelade in the Channel Islands, an influential synthesis of the Palaeolithic of North Africa, extensive excavations in Libya (at the Haua Fteah cave) and, in later years, excavations in Iran and Afghanistan. He also published on French prehistory, archaeological work in the Soviet Union, and on cave art. His continuing influence is felt in the work of his many pupils who include King Charles III and Queen Margrethe II of Denmark.

== Personal life ==
In 1950, he became a British citizen.

He was the father of the composer and writer Gerard McBurney and the actor and director Simon McBurney.
