= Gerard McBurney =

British composer

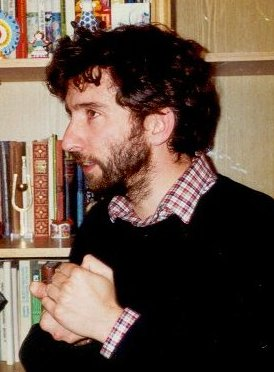
- In Moscow, 1989. Photo by Dmitri N. Smirnov
- Born: 20 June 1954 (age 72); Cambridge, UK
- Occupations: Composer, broadcaster, teacher and writer
- Father: Charles McBurney
- Relatives: Simon McBurney (brother); Charles McBurney (great-grandfather)

Gerard McBurney (born 20 June 1954) is a British composer, arranger, broadcaster, teacher and writer.

== Life ==
Born in Cambridge, England, he is the son of Charles McBurney, an American archaeologist, and Anne Francis Edmondstone (née Charles), who was a British secretary of English, Scots, and Irish ancestry. Gerard's younger brother is Simon McBurney, an English actor, writer and director.

Gerard was educated at Winchester College, Corpus Christi College, Cambridge – where he read English Literature – and at the Moscow Conservatory.

== Work ==
For many years he lived in London, teaching first at the London College of Music and later, for 12 years, at the Royal Academy of Music. He also worked as artistic advisor with various orchestras, performers and presenters including The Hallé, Complicité and Lincoln Center.

In September 2006, he was appointed Artistic Programming Advisor to the Chicago Symphony Orchestra and Creative Director of the CSO's multimedia series Beyond the Score:

- Bartók – The Miraculous Mandarin 2006
- Mozart – Piano Concerto No. 27 2007
- Tchaikovsky – Symphony No. 4 2008
- Shostakovich – Symphony No. 4 2008
- Holst – The Planets: suite 2008
- Vivaldi – The 4 Seasons 2008
- Mussorgsky/Ravel – Pictures from an Exhibition 2008
- Sibelius – Symphony No. 5 2010
- Dvořák – Symphony No. 9 (From the New World) 2010

McBurney's original compositions include orchestral works, a ballet, a chamber opera, songs and chamber music as well as many theater scores. He also is well known for his reconstructions of various lost and forgotten works by Dmitri Shostakovich. In 2008 McBurney collaborated with Scottish poet Iain Finlay Macleod, director Kath Burlinson and choreographer Struan Leslie on an adaptation of The Silver Bough by F. Marian McNeill. The resultant work was produced by British Youth Music Theatre at the Aberdeen International Youth Festival.

As a scholar, he has published mostly in the field of Russian and Soviet music. For 20 years, he created and presented many hundreds of programmes on BBC Radio 3 as well as occasional programmes for other radio stations in the U.K., Europe and the former Soviet Union.

McBurney has written, researched and presented more than two dozen documentary television films for British and German television channels, mostly working with the director Barrie Gavin.

His reconstruction of Shostakovich's rediscovered operatic fragment Orango was premiered by the Los Angeles Philharmonic in December 2011.

== Shostakovich reconstructions ==
- Hypothetically Murdered (1992)
- Orango (2011)
