= Charles McBurney (surgeon) =

American surgeon

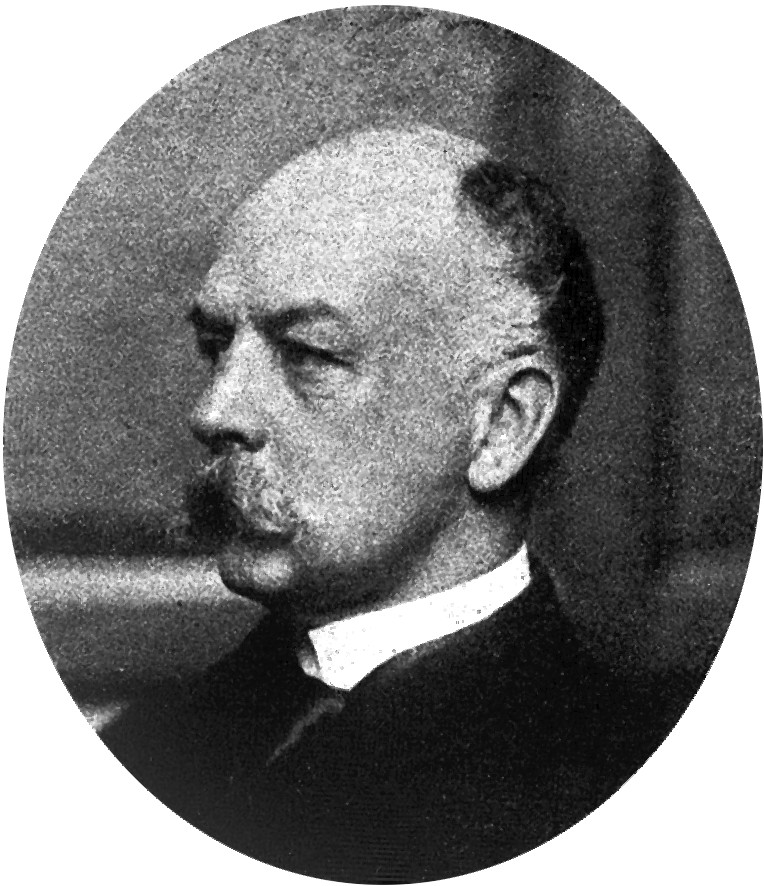
Charles McBurney

Charles Heber McBurney (17 February 1845 in Roxbury, Massachusetts – 7 November 1913 in Brookline, Massachusetts) was an American surgeon, well known for describing McBurney's point in appendicitis.

== Life and career ==
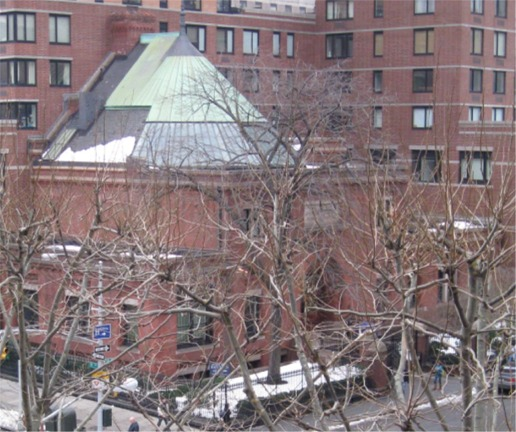
William J. Syms Operating Theater of Charles McBurney (surgeon) at Roosevelt Hospital

Charles McBurney was born in 1845. He graduated in the arts from Harvard College in 1866, and qualified in medicine at the College of Physicians and Surgeons of Columbia University in New York City with an M.D. in 1870. He trained further in Europe for 2 years, and started practice in New York in 1873. He became assistant surgeon to the Bellevue Hospital in 1880, and surgeon-in-chief of the Roosevelt Hospital (now Mount Sinai West) in 1888. Here he did his most famous work on appendicitis, presenting his report on operative management to the New York Surgical Society in 1889. He described the point of greatest tenderness in appendicitis, which is now known as McBurney's point. He was professor of surgery from 1889 to 1907, and thereafter became emeritus professor of surgery. He continued to advance the treatment of appendicitis, and in 1894 he described the incision that he used; although the incision had previously been described by Louis L. MacArthur, it became known as McBurney's incision. He was awarded an honorary fellowship by the Royal College of Surgeons of Edinburgh in 1905 during the college's 400th anniversary celebrations. The honorary fellowship was awarded to the 36 most well known surgeons of the time.

In addition to his work on appendicitis, McBurney also published papers on the treatment of pyloric stenosis, management of shoulder dislocation with fracture of the humerus, and gallstone disease. He also introduced the use of rubber gloves during his operations to improve aseptic technique, following the lead of William Halsted.

After U.S. President William McKinley was shot on September 6, 1901, McBurney led the medical team that oversaw his recovery after emergency surgery and announced to the press on September 10 that the President's condition was improving and that he was out of danger.

He was a keen hunter and fisherman, and died in 1913 on a hunting trip in Massachusetts.

His grandson was American archaeologist Charles McBurney and his great-grandsons are English actor, writer and director Simon McBurney, and English composer, arranger and broadcaster Gerard McBurney.

== External Sources ==
- Guide to the Charles McBurney Papers 1894 at the University of Chicago Special Collections Research Center
