= Ötzi =

Natural mummy of a Chalcolithic man from Europe

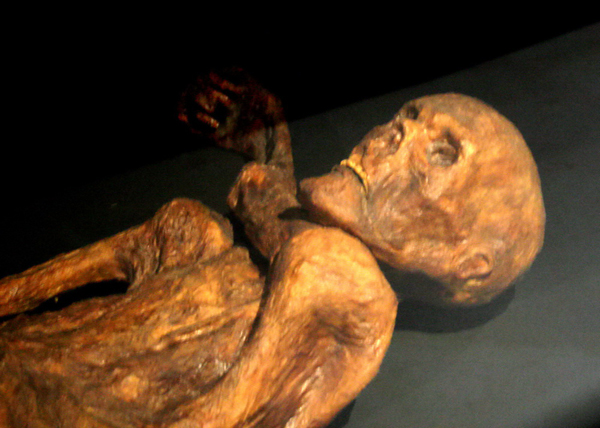
- The mummified remains of Ötzi on display at the South Tyrol Museum of Archaeology
- Pronunciation: German: [ˈœtsi]
- Born: c. 3275 BC; Near the present village of Feldthurns (Velturno), north of Bolzano, Italy
- Died: c. 3230 BC (aged c. 45); Ötztal Alps, near Tisenjoch on the border between Austria and Italy
- Resting place: South Tyrol Museum of Archaeology, South Tyrol, Italy
- Other names: Ötzi the Iceman; Similaun man; Tyrolean Iceman
- Known for: Oldest known natural mummy of a Chalcolithic European man
- Height: 160 cm (5 ft 3 in)

"Ötzi" (German: [œtsi]; c. 3275 BC – c. 3230 BC), also called the Iceman, Similaun man, or Tyrolean Iceman, is the natural mummy of a man who lived during the 4th millennium BC. Ötzi's remains were discovered on 19 September 1991, on the Italian side of the Ötztal Alps (hence the nickname "Ötzi"), merely 93 meters or 102 yards south of the Austria-Italy border. He is Europe's oldest known natural human mummy, showing an unprecedented view of Chalcolithic (Copper Age) Europeans.

Because of the presence of an arrowhead embedded in his left shoulder and various other wounds, researchers believe that Ötzi was killed by another person. The nature of his life and the circumstances of his death are the subject of much investigation and speculation. His remains and personal belongings are on exhibit at the South Tyrol Museum of Archaeology in Bolzano, South Tyrol, Italy.

== Discovery ==
Ötzi was discovered on 19 September 1991 by German tourists Helmut and Erika Simon near the Tisenjoch pass in the Ötztal Alps. At about 3,210 metres (10,530 ft) above sea level, they saw the upper part of his body protruding from the ice. Because the site was close to the Austria–Italy border, both Austrian police and the Italian Carabinieri were notified. At first, Ötzi was thought to be a mountaineer who had recently died.

Attempts to recover his body began the next day but were delayed by bad weather and continued until 23 September. During this time, mountaineers Reinhold Messner and Hans Kammerlander examined some of Ötzi's belongings, including leather clothing, birch bark containers and an axe. After seeing a drawing of the axe, Messner suggested that the remains might be much older than first thought.

Before Ötzi was recovered, several people visited the site. Fragile objects were stepped on and others were removed before their locations had been recorded, destroying some evidence about where his belongings had originally been lying. Researchers later interviewed visitors to reconstruct the locations of the finds.

Ötzi was finally removed from the ice on 23 September, four days after his discovery. No archaeologist was present. A dagger was found beside him, and a long wooden object nearby was later identified as a bow. His body was flown to Vent and then taken to the Institute of Forensic Medicine in Innsbruck for examination.

It was still unclear whether Ötzi had been found in Austria or Italy. The border established under the Treaty of Saint-Germain-en-Laye of 1919 was intended to follow the Alpine watershed, but snow and ice had made the area difficult to map accurately. On 2 October, thirteen days after Ötzi's discovery, an official survey placed the find site 92.56 metres (101.22 yd) inside Italy, in South Tyrol. South Tyrol claimed ownership of Ötzi, but agreed that his body could remain temporarily in Innsbruck while examinations continued.

== Condition ==
When Ötzi was recovered in September 1991, he was a wet mummy that had been naturally preserved in glacier ice. Although much of the fluid in his body had been lost through dehydration, he remained preserved almost in his entirety. His tissues, bones and internal organs were well preserved, and his mummified body measured about 1.54 m (5 ft 1 in) in length.

Other parts of Ötzi's body had disappeared during decomposition. His epidermis, or outer layer of skin, had been shed, and his body hair had been lost. His fingernails and toenails had also fallen off. Clumps of his dark hair were found around the body, while one fingernail and two toenails were recovered during later excavations.

Ötzi suffered further damage during his recovery and subsequent handling. A pneumatic drill damaged his hip, his left arm was broken during handling, and elements of his clothing were destroyed. His longbow was also broken during the recovery. His clothing had already been damaged by wind and weather after the surrounding ice melted and was further damaged during the recovery.

By 24 September 1991, the day after his recovery, Ötzi's body had begun to decompose. He was placed in a refrigerated cell at the Institute of Forensic Medicine in Innsbruck that simulated glacier conditions. Fungus also began growing on his skin while he was at the mortuary, and within days scientists began more rigorous efforts to stabilize the mummy.

== Clothing and associated items ==
=== Clothes ===
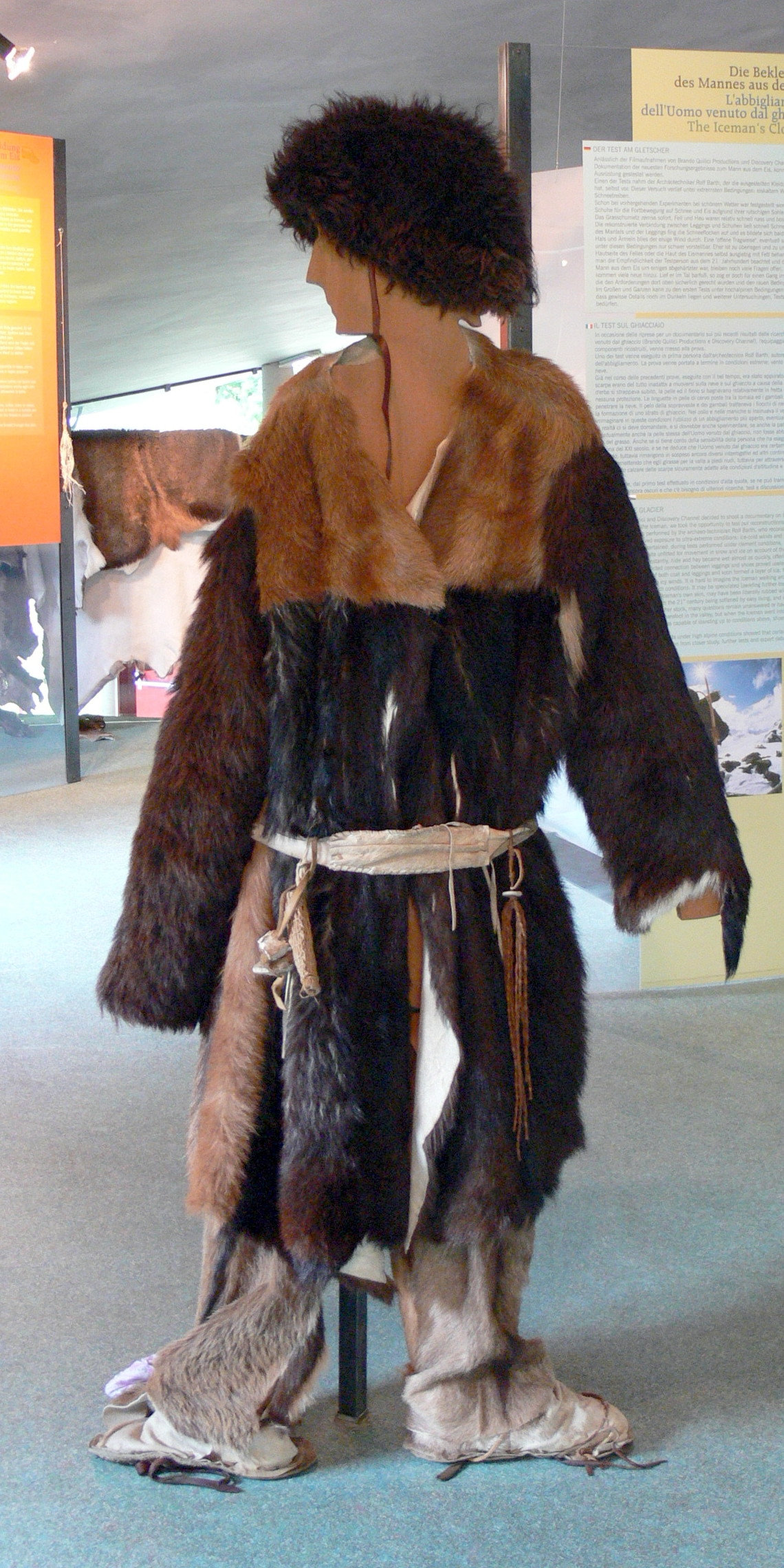
Reconstruction of the neolithic clothes worn by Ötzi at the Archeoparc Museum

Ötzi wore a cloak made of woven grass (Note: In the book Cookwise by Shirley Corriher, the point is made (in relation to cooking) that plant leaves have a waterproof, waxy cuticle which makes raindrops roll off, with the comment "it was interesting that the 5,000-year-old Alpine traveler ... had a grass raincoat".) and a coat, a belt, a pair of leggings, a loincloth, and shoes, all made of leather of different skins. He also wore a bearskin cap with a leather chin strap. The coat, belt, leggings and loincloth were constructed of vertical strips of leather sewn together with sinew. His belt had a pouch sewn to it that contained a cache of useful items: a scraper, a drill, a flint flake, a bone awl and a dried fungus (see § Tools and equipment below).

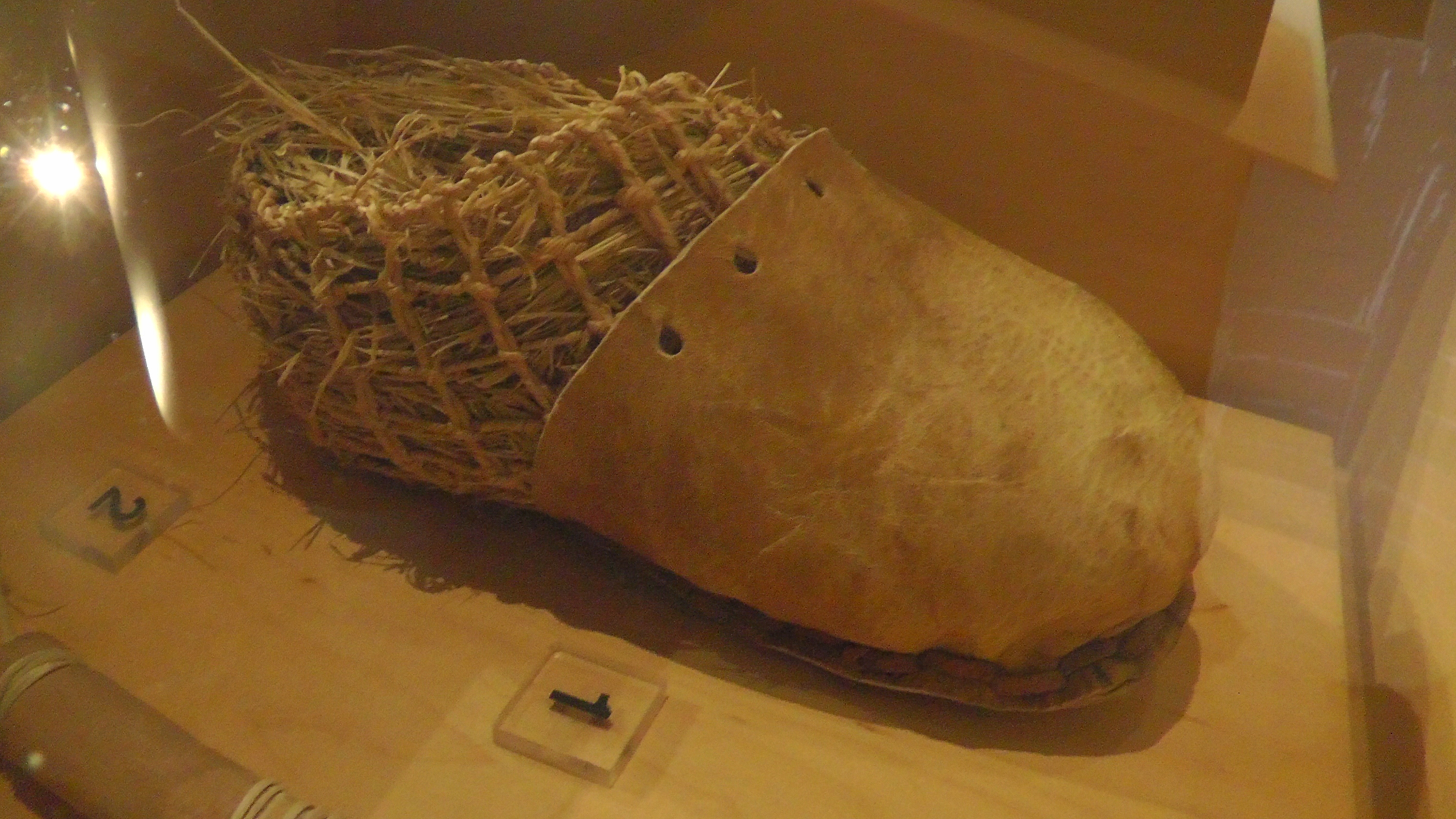
A replica of Ötzi's shoe at the Bata Shoe Museum

=== Shoes ===
The shoes were waterproof and wide, seemingly designed for walking across the snow. They were constructed using bearskin for the soles, deer hide for the top panels, and a netting made of tree bark. Soft grass went around the foot and in the shoe, functioning like modern socks.

The shoes have since been reproduced by a Czech academic, who said that "because the shoes are actually quite complex, I'm convinced that even 5,300 years ago, people had the equivalent of a cobbler who made shoes for other people". The reproductions were found to constitute such excellent footwear that a Czech company reportedly offered to purchase the rights to sell them. However, a more recent hypothesis by British archaeologist Jacqui Wood posits that Ötzi's shoes were actually the upper part of snowshoes. According to this theory, the item currently interpreted as part of a backpack is actually the wood frame and netting of one snowshoe and animal hide to cover the face.

=== Analysis ===
The leather loincloth and hide coat were made from sheepskin. Genetic analysis showed that the sheep species was nearer to modern domestic European sheep than to wild sheep; the items were made from the skins of at least four animals. Part of the coat was made from a domesticated goat belonging to a mitochondrial haplogroup (a common female ancestor) that inhabits central Europe today. The coat was made from several animals from two different species and was stitched together using hides. The leggings were made from domesticated goat leather. A similar set of 5,000-year-old leggings discovered in Schnidejoch, Switzerland, were made from goat leather as well.

Irish and Italian researchers were able to undertake an analysis of the mitochondrial DNA from six different items of the body's clothing and published their findings in the journal Scientific Reports. These showed that the shoelaces were made from the European genetic population of cattle. The quiver was made from wild roe deer, and the fur hat was made from a genetic lineage of brown bear which lives in the region today.

=== Tools and equipment ===
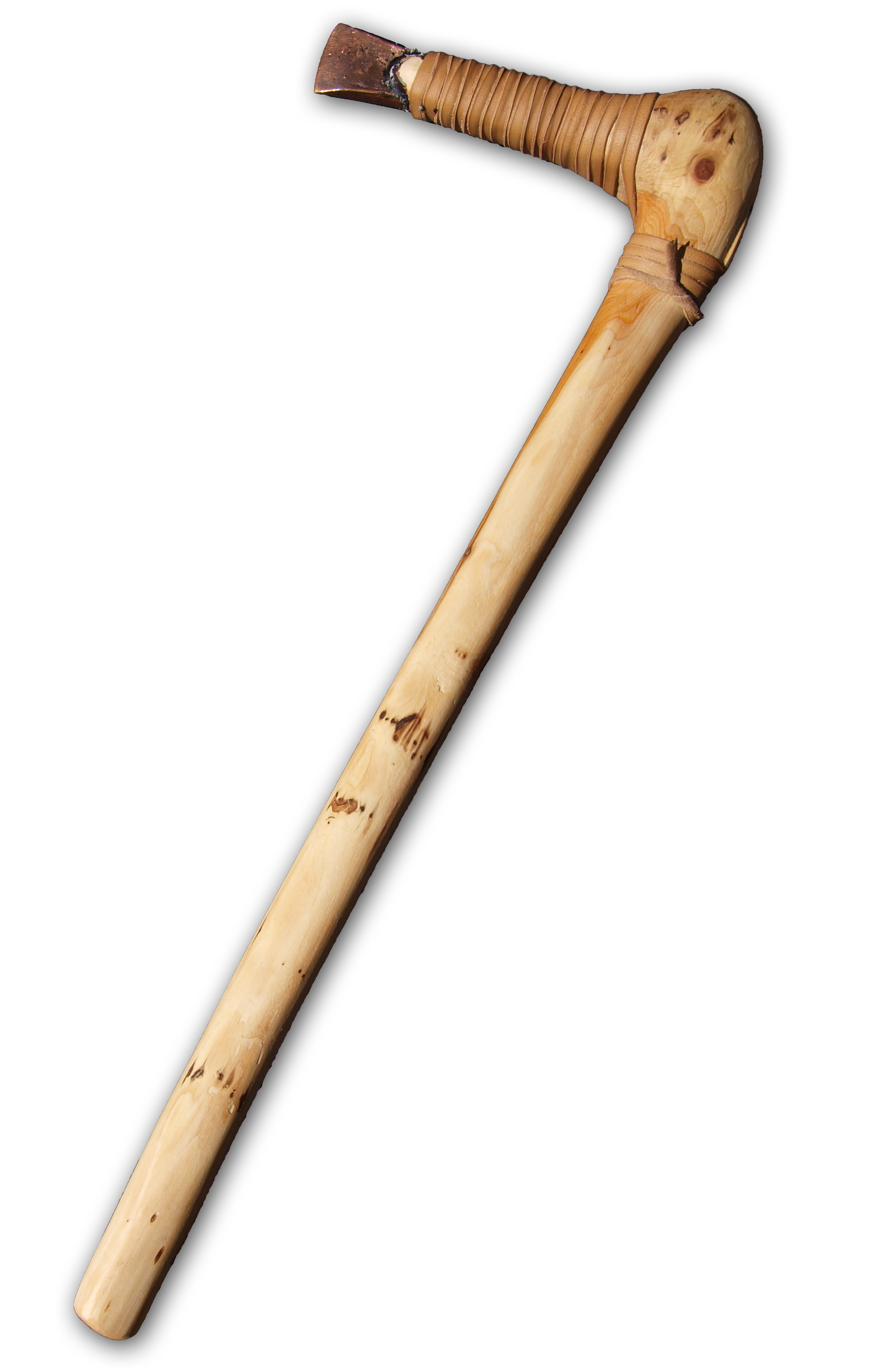
A replica of Ötzi's copper axe

Other items found with the Iceman were a copper axe with a yew handle, a chert-bladed knife with an ash handle and a quiver of 14 arrows with viburnum and dogwood shafts. Two of the arrows, which were broken, were tipped with flint and had fletching (stabilizing fins), while the other 12 were unfinished and untipped. The arrows were found in a quiver with what is presumed to be a bow string, an unidentified tool, and an antler tool which might have been used for sharpening arrow points. There was also an unfinished yew longbow that was 1.82 m (72 in) long.

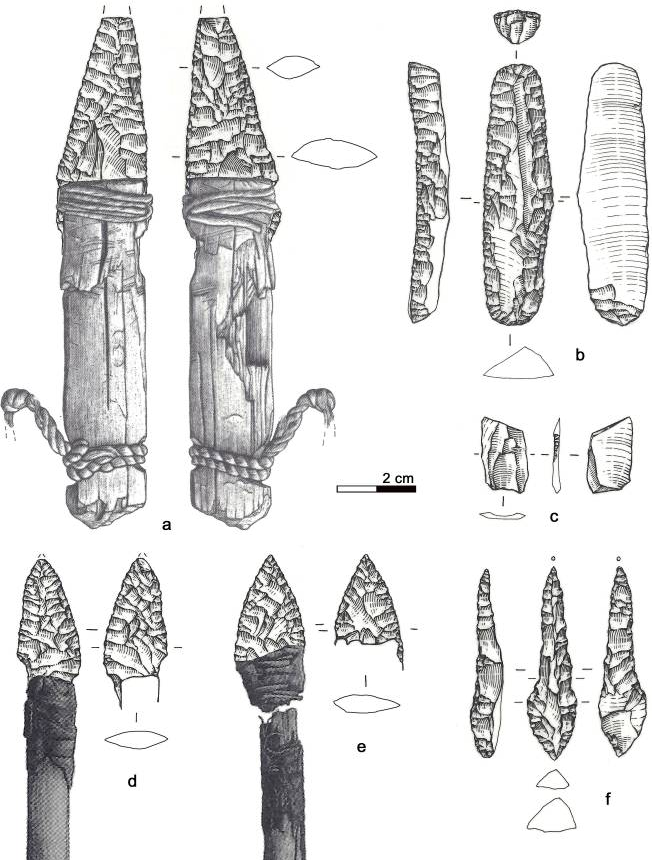
Lineup of Ötzi's lithic assemblage: 1. Dagger; 2. End scraper; 3. Small flake; 4. Arrowhead 14; 5. Arrowhead 12; 6. Borer

Among Ötzi's possessions were berries, two birch bark baskets, and two species of polypore mushrooms with leather strings through them. One of these, the birch fungus, is known to have anthelmintic properties, and was probably used for medicinal purposes. The other was a type of tinder fungus, included with part of what appeared to be a complex firelighting kit. The kit featured pieces of over a dozen different plants, in addition to flint and pyrite for creating sparks.

Ötzi's copper axe was of particular interest. His axe's haft is 60 cm (24 in) long and made from carefully worked yew with a right-angled crook at the shoulder, leading to the blade. The 9.5-centimetre-long (3.7 in) axe head is almost pure copper. It was produced through casting and did not undergo mechanical hardening. Though copper ore sources in the Alpines are known to have been exploited in Ötzi's time, a 2017 study indicated that the copper in the axe came from southern Tuscany. It was let into the forked end of the crook and fixed there using birch-tar and tight leather lashing. The blade part of the head extends out of the lashing and shows clear signs of having been used to chop and cut. Such an axe would have been a valuable possession, important both as a tool and as a status symbol.

== Initial analysis ==
The body was extracted on 22 September and salvaged the following day. It was transported to the office of the medical examiner in Innsbruck, together with other objects found nearby. On 24 September, the find was examined there by archaeologist Konrad Spindler of the University of Innsbruck. He dated the find to be "at least four thousand years old" on the basis of the typology of an axe among the retrieved objects. Tissue samples from the corpse and other accompanying materials were later analyzed at several scientific institutions and their results unequivocally concluded that the remains belonged to someone who had lived between 3359 and 3105 BC, or some 5,100 years prior. More specific estimates find that there was a 66% chance he died between 3239 and 3105 BC, a 33% chance he died between 3359 and 3294 BC, and a 1% chance he died between 3277 and 3268 BC.

== Scientific analyses ==
=== Physical condition ===
Ötzi frozen in the glacier, photographed by Helmut Simon upon discovery in September 1991

At the time of his death, around 3230 BCE, Ötzi was about 45 years old. His body measured about 160 cm (5 ft 3 in) tall, and his living weight has been estimated at about 50 kg (110 lb). A 2006 study using computed tomography (CT) scans of his skeleton produced somewhat different estimates of 158 cm (5 ft 2 in) and 61 kg (134 lb).

Ötzi's leg bones also provide evidence of his level of mobility. Analysis of his tibia, or shinbone, found structural adaptations associated with high mobility over rough terrain. Compared with most other Neolithic European men examined by the researchers, Ötzi appears to have had a more mobile lifestyle.

Examination of Ötzi's bones, joints and muscles found evidence of long-term damage sustained before his death. Medical imaging showed damage to his spine and arthritis and other abnormalities affecting his right knee and ankle. Researchers concluded that these conditions probably caused chronic pain in his back, right knee and right ankle during the later years of his life.

=== Health and disease ===
Ötzi had several health problems. He was infected with Trichuris trichiura (whipworm), an intestinal parasite. The severity of the infection is unknown.

By his mid-40s, his teeth were heavily worn and had several cavities, including one that reached the dental pulp. He also had periodontitis, with some loss of the bone supporting his teeth, and an injured upper front tooth. Researchers linked the cavities to dietary changes associated with the spread of agriculture during the Neolithic.

One surviving fingernail has three Beau's lines, grooves caused when illness interrupts nail growth. They indicate that Ötzi was ill three times during his final six months, most recently about two months before his death, when the illness lasted at least two weeks.

Ötzi was also infected with Helicobacter pylori. In 2016, researchers reconstructed the bacterium's 5,300-year-old genome from his digestive tract. It belonged to hpAsia2, an Asian-derived bacterial population that existed in prehistoric Europe before later mixing with African-derived strains.

DNA recovered from Ötzi also contained sequences belonging to the bacterial genus Borrelia. A 2012 study identified them as Borrelia burgdorferi, a cause of Lyme disease. A 2013 reanalysis found that most of the sequences could not be assigned to a particular species and that species-specific sequences matched several Borrelia species. The researchers concluded that the ancient strain was genetically distinct from known B. burgdorferi.

=== Provenance ===
Analysis of pollen, dust grains and the isotopic composition of his tooth enamel indicates that he spent his childhood near what is now the South Tyrol village of Feldthurns, north of Bolzano, but later went to live in valleys about 50 kilometres (31 mi) farther north.

=== Diet ===
In 2009, a CAT scan revealed that after death the stomach had shifted upward to where his lower lung area would normally be. Analysis of the contents revealed the partly digested remains of ibex meat, confirmed by DNA analysis, suggesting he had had a meal less than two hours before his death. Wheat grains were also found. It is believed that he most likely had a few slices of a dried, fatty meat, which came from a wild goat in South Tyrol, Italy. Analysis of his intestinal contents showed two meals (the last one consumed about eight hours before his death), one of chamois meat, the other of red deer and herb bread; both were eaten with roots and fruits. The grain also eaten with both meals was a highly processed einkorn wheat bran, possibly bread. In the proximity of the body, and thus possibly originating from the Iceman's provisions, chaff and grains of einkorn and barley, and seeds of flax and poppy were discovered, as well as kernels of sloes (small plum-like fruits of the blackthorn tree) and various wild berry seeds.

Hair analysis was used to examine his diet in the months preceding his death. Pollen in the first meal showed that it had been consumed in a mid-altitude conifer forest. Other pollens indicated the presence of wheat and legumes, which may have been domesticated crops. Pollen grains of hop-hornbeam were also discovered. The pollen was very well preserved, with the cells inside remaining intact, indicating that it had been fresh (estimated about two hours old) at the time of Ötzi's death, which places the event in the spring or early summer. Einkorn wheat is harvested in the late summer, and sloes in the autumn; these must have been stored from the previous year.

Ötzi's stomach was completely full and its contents were mostly undigested. In 2018, researchers thoroughly analysed his stomach and intestines to gain insights on Chalcolithic meal composition and dietary habits. Biopsies were performed on the stomach to obtain dietary information in the time leading up to his death, and the contents themselves were also analyzed. Previously, Ötzi was believed to be vegetarian, but during this study, it was revealed that his diet was omnivorous. The presence of certain compounds suggests what kinds of food he generally ate, such as gamma-terpinene, implying the intake of herbs, and several nutritious minerals indicating red meat or dairy consumption. Through analysis of DNA and protein traces, the researchers were able to identify the contents of Ötzi's last meal, composed of fat and meat from ibex and red deer as well as einkorn wheat. The results of atomic force microscopy and Raman spectroscopy analysis reveal that he consumed fresh or dried wild meat. A previous study detected charcoal particles in his lower intestine, which indicate that fire was present during some part of the food preparation process, but it was likely used in drying out the meat or smoking it. In addition, traces of Bracken fern, which is toxic to humans, were found in his stomach. Researchers hypothesized that he either consumed it as medicine to treat the parasites in his intestine or used it to wrap his other food and thus unintentionally ingested the toxic spores.

=== Profession ===
High levels of copper and arsenic were found in his hair. This, along with his copper axe blade, which is 99.7% copper, has led scientists to speculate that he was involved in copper smelting.

By examining the proportions of his tibia, femur and pelvis, it was postulated that his lifestyle included long walks over hilly terrain. This degree of mobility is not characteristic of other Copper Age Europeans. This may indicate that he was a high-altitude shepherd.

=== Skeletal details and tattooing ===
Ötzi had a total of 61 tattoos. They consisted of 19 groups of black lines ranging from 1–3 mm (0.039–0.118 in) in width and 7–40 mm (0.28–1.57 in) in length. These include groups of parallel lines along the longitudinal axis of his body and to both sides of the lumbar spine, as well as a cruciform mark behind the right knee and on the right ankle, and parallel lines around the left wrist. The greatest concentration of markings is found on his legs, which together exhibit 12 groups of lines. A microscopic examination of samples collected from these tattoos revealed that they were created from pigment manufactured out of fireplace ash or soot. In 2024, a research team experimented with different possible paleolithic tattooing techniques and concluded that Ötzi's tattoos were most consistent with a puncture tattooing technique, probably with a bone point or copper awl, rather than an incision-based technique as previously speculated. It has been suggested that he was repeatedly tattooed in the same locations, since the majority of them are quite dark.

Radiological examination of his bones showed "age-conditioned or strain-induced degeneration" corresponding to many tattooed areas, including osteochondrosis and slight spondylosis in the lumbar spine and wear-and-tear degeneration in the knee and especially in the ankle joints. These tattoos may have been part of pain relief treatments similar to acupressure or acupuncture, though Ötzi lived at least 2,000 years before their earliest use in China (c. 1000 BC). Ötzi's abdominal tattoos may have assuaged the intestinal pain caused by his whipworm infection.

At one point, it was thought that Ötzi was the oldest tattooed human mummy yet discovered. In 2018, however, tattoos were discovered on nearly contemporaneous Egyptian mummies.

Many of Ötzi's tattoos originally went unnoticed, since they are difficult to see with the naked eye. In 2015, researchers photographed the body using noninvasive multispectral techniques to capture images on light wavelengths imperceptible to humans, revealing the remainder of his tattoos.

=== Genetic analysis ===
Ötzi's full genome was first sequenced in 2012. A new, high-coverage genome with much less modern human contamination was published in 2023.

According to the 2012 study, the Y chromosome DNA of Ötzi belongs to a subclade of G defined by the SNPs M201, P287, P15, L223 and L91 (G-L91, ISOGG G2a2b, former "G2a4"). He was not typed for any of the subclades downstreaming from G-L91; however, an analysis of his Binary Alignment Map file revealed that he belongs to the L166 and FGC5672 subclades below L91. G-L91 is now mostly found in South Corsica. Analysis of his mitochondrial DNA (mtDNA) showed that Ötzi belongs to the K1 subclade, but cannot be categorized into any of the three modern branches of that subclade (K1a, K1b, or K1c). The new subclade has provisionally been named K1ö for Ötzi. A multiplex assay study was able to confirm that the Iceman's mtDNA belongs to a previously unknown European mtDNA clade with a very limited distribution among modern data sets. By autosomal DNA, Ötzi is most closely related to Southern Europeans, especially geographically isolated populations like Corsicans and Sardinians. Ötzi traced the majority of his ancestry to the Neolithic Early European Farmers who migrated from Anatolia to Europe beginning during the 7th millennium BC, replacing earlier European hunter-gatherers as the dominant population. DNA analysis also showed him at high risk of atherosclerosis and lactose intolerance.

The 2023 study on Ötzi's genome found a very high proportion (90%) of Anatolian farmer-related ancestry – in fact, the highest among European populations of the same time—with a lesser contribution from European hunter-gatherer-related ancestry, but (in contrast to the 2012 research) no evidence of Steppe-related ancestry, the disagreement with previous results being attributed to modern human contamination. While the absence in Ötzi's genome of genetic components from Western Steppe Herders (WSH) is not surprising because these "Proto-Indo-European" populations did not arrive in Europe until about 2900 BC, the unusually low contribution from the Western Hunter Gatherers was explained by positing that the genetic mixing between neolithic farmers originating from Anatolia and WHG was still an ongoing process. Examining the genetic sites involved in phenotypical traits, the authors concluded that the Iceman likely had darker skin than present-day Europeans (though not as dark as the Mesolithic Western Hunter-Gatherers), was likely affected by baldness, and may have suffered from obesity-related metabolic disorders. The article also leaves room for environmental factors as indicative of their darker skin complexion, so more studies will be necessary in the future.

In October 2013, it was reported that 19 modern Tyrolean men belong to the same paternal lineage (Y-DNA haplogroup G-L91) as Ötzi, and may share a common ancestor with, and/or descend from close relatives of Ötzi. Scientists from the Institute of Legal Medicine at Innsbruck Medical University had analysed the DNA of over 3,700 Tyrolean male blood donors and found 19 (c. 0.5%) who shared the same paternal haplogroup with the 5,300-year-old man.

In 2026, as part of a study involving biological specimens found on Ötzi's body, researchers successfully made bread with some yeast that had been found on the body.

== Death ==
=== Preservation after death ===
Ötzi's body was not continuously frozen after his death. Analysis of his tissues found that they had first converted to adipocere, a wax-like substance formed from body fat in wet conditions, before the body eventually dried out. This indicates that Ötzi spent months in water over several seasons before becoming desiccated and preserved in ice.

=== Cause of death ===
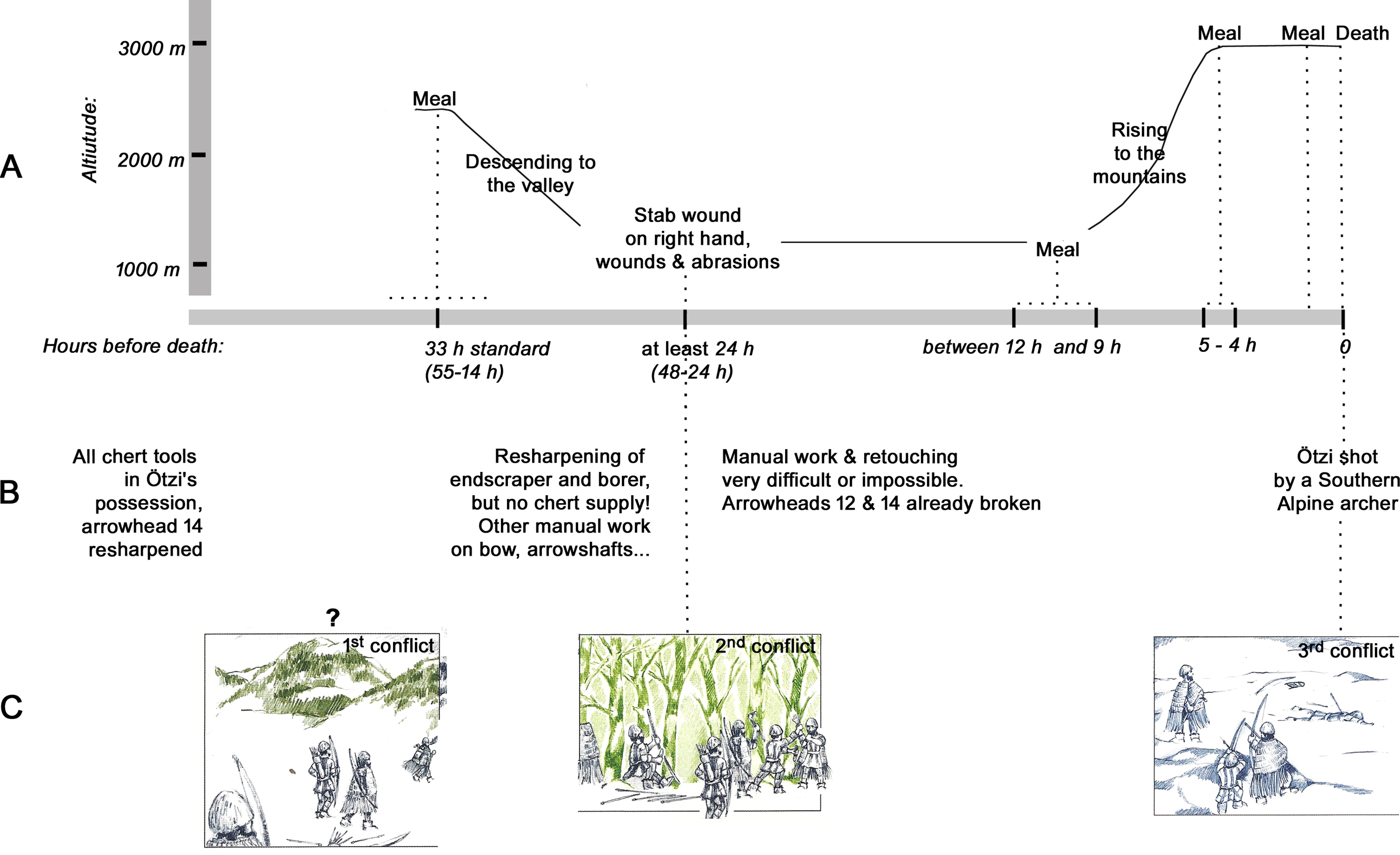
Reconstructions of Ötzi's last days, based on his last itinerary and meals, the state of his wounds, the causes of his death and the damaged and insufficient equipment, following multiple studies

The cause of death remained uncertain until 10 years after the discovery of the body. It was initially believed that Ötzi died from exposure during a winter storm. Later, it was speculated that he had been a victim of a ritual sacrifice, perhaps for being a chieftain. This explanation was inspired by theories previously advanced for bodies recovered from peat bogs such as Tollund Man and Lindow Man.

=== Arrowhead and blood analyses ===
In 2001, X-rays and a CT scan revealed that Ötzi had an arrowhead lodged in his left shoulder when he died and a small, matching tear in his coat. Researchers theorized that Ötzi died of blood loss from the wound, which likely would have been fatal even if modern medical techniques had been available. Further research found that the arrow's shaft had been removed before death, and close examination of the body found bruises and cuts to the hands, wrists and chest and cerebral trauma indicative of a blow to the head. He received a cut at the base of his thumb from a sharp object which penetrated to the bone. This wound showed no scarring, suggesting that it was fresh at the time of his death. Currently, it is believed that Ötzi bled to death after the arrow shattered the scapula and damaged nerves and blood vessels before lodging near his lung. Additional studies have suggested a lack of oxygen from the bleeding, which together with the high altitudes, temperature, and physical exertion may have contributed to his death.

DNA analyses taken in 2003 are claimed to have revealed traces of blood from at least four other people on his gear: one from his knife, two from a single arrowhead in his quiver, and a fourth from his coat. Interpretations of these findings are that Ötzi killed two people with the same arrow and was able to retrieve it on both occasions, and the blood on his coat was from a wounded comrade he may have carried over his back. Ötzi's posture (frozen body, face down, left arm bent across the chest) could support a hypothesis that, before death occurred and rigor mortis set in, the Iceman was turned onto his belly in the effort to remove the arrow shaft. Alternatively, a 2024 study suggested his arm position indicated an attempt to slow his own blood loss. The Cambridge World History of Violence (2020) cited Ötzi as evidence of prehistoric warfare.

=== Alternative theory of death location ===
Most research has assumed that Ötzi died at roughly the spot where he was found. In 2010, it was proposed that Ötzi died at a much lower altitude and was buried higher in the mountains, as posited by archaeologist Alessandro Vanzetti of the Sapienza University of Rome and his colleagues. According to their study of the items found near Ötzi and their locations, the Iceman may have been placed above what has been interpreted as a stone burial mound, but his body subsequently moved with each thaw cycle that created a flowing watery mixture driven by gravity before being re-frozen. While archaeobotanist Klaus Oeggl of the University of Innsbruck agrees that the natural process described probably caused the body to move from the ridge that includes the stone formation, he pointed out that the paper provided no compelling evidence to demonstrate that the scattered stones constituted a burial platform. Moreover, biological anthropologist Albert Zink argues that the Iceman's bones display no dislocations that would have resulted from a downhill slide and that the intact blood clots in his arrow wound would show damage if the body had been moved up the mountain.

== Legal dispute ==
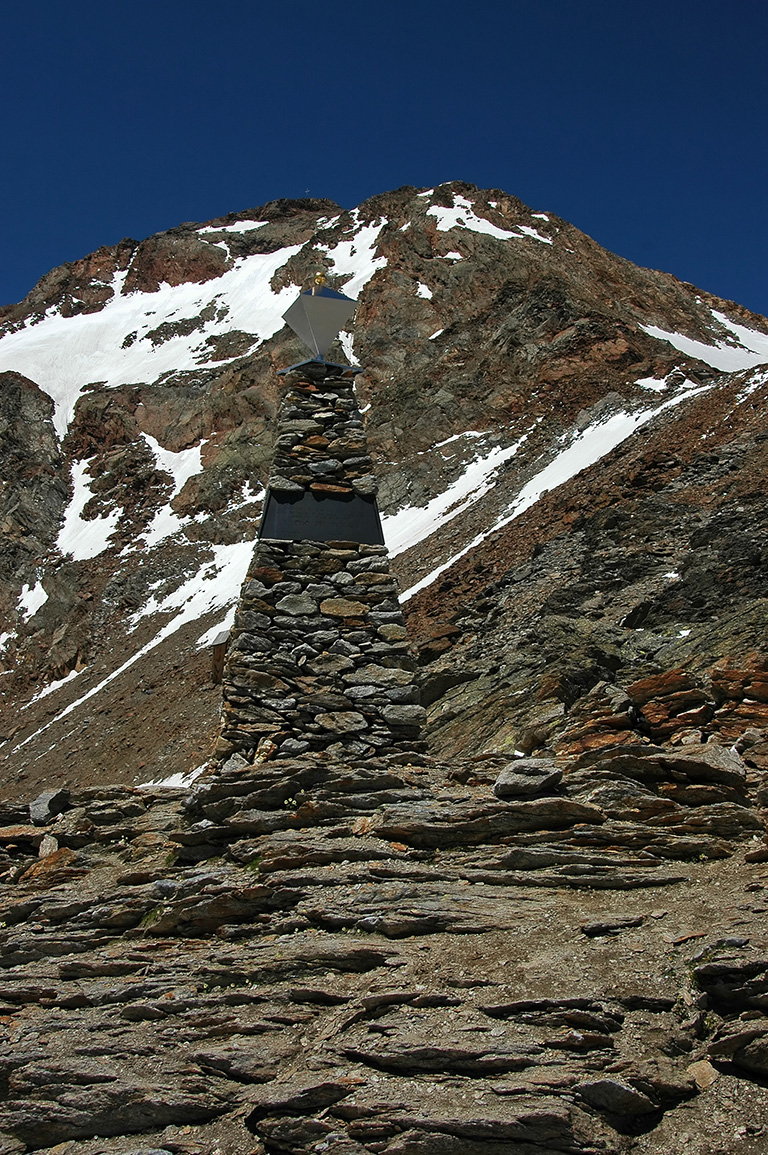
The Ötzi memorial near Tisenjoch. Ötzi was found about 70 m (230 ft) northeast, a place indicated with a red mark (not pictured).

After Ötzi's discovery, other people claimed that they, rather than Helmut and Erika Simon, had found his body first. Under Italian law, the Simons were entitled to a finder's fee of 25% of Ötzi's value. In 1994, three years after the discovery, the South Tyrolean provincial government offered them 10 million lire (€5,200), which they rejected.

In 2003, a court in Bolzano recognized the Simons as Ötzi's official discoverers. Helmut Simon died the following year, before the dispute was settled. In 2006, an appeals court confirmed that the Simons had discovered Ötzi and were entitled to a finder's fee. The case ended in September 2008, seventeen years after Ötzi's discovery, when Erika Simon and the provincial government agreed on a payment of €150,000.

== Exhibition ==
Since 1998, Ötzi has been on display at the South Tyrol Museum of Archaeology in Bolzano, the capital of South Tyrol.

Using modern 3D scanning technology, a facial reconstruction has been created for the museum. It shows the Iceman looking old for his 45 years, with deep-set brown eyes, a beard, a furrowed face, and sunken cheeks. He is depicted as tired and ungroomed.

== See also ==
- Iceman – a 2017 fictional film about the life of Ötzi
- Similar archaeological finds:
  - Children of Llullaillaco and Mummy Juanita – high-altitude Incan mummies
  - Gebelein predynastic mummies – roughly contemporaneous Egyptian mummies
  - Saltmen – well-preserved Iranian mummies
  - Tarim Basin mummies – well-preserved Central Asian mummies
