= Brian Lobel =

Brian Lobel is an artist and scholar based in the United Kingdom. He is a professor of Theatre and Performance at Rose Bruford College. His work has been featured at the Sydney Opera House, the National Theatre in London, and Harvard Medical School. He is known for his Live Art practice based in 'candid, personal interactions', and his work dealing with themes, issues and experiences around cancer.

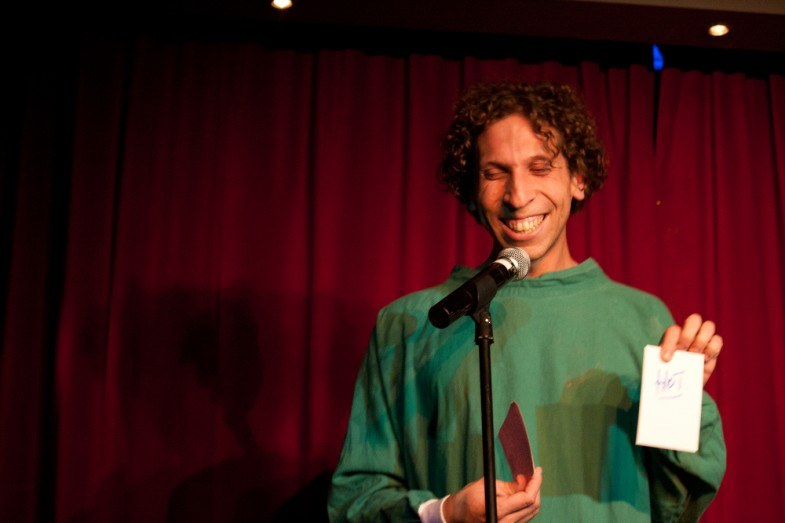
Brian Lobel

== Life and education ==
Lobel is from upstate New York and resides in London. He studied with Holly Hughes at the University of Michigan, Ann Arbor. In 2001, at the age of 20, he was diagnosed with testicular cancer while enrolled at the University of Michigan. This was a formative experience for him, and much of his work 'draws on his own experience of cancer treatment'. He received his PhD in drama from Queen Mary University London.

In 2017 Lobel appeared on the British reality show Come Dine With Me, ultimately winning the competition.

== Career ==
Lobel has worked at universities throughout the United Kingdom. Prior to becoming a professor of Theatre and Performance at Rose Bruford in 2020, he was a reader at the University of Chichester and a Knowledge Exchange Fellow at the Central School of Speech and Drama.

From 2014 to 2016, Lobel served as an Engagement Fellow for the Wellcome Trust (2014–2016). In that role he co-founded The Sick of the Fringe with Tracy Gentles. The Sick of the Fringe 'supports artists and theatre-makers to get outside their comfort zones, to explore new and different ways of thinking and working'. It looks to bring attention to was founded in order to ‘connect art, health and social change’ and 'challenge and fight inequality, inaccessibility, elitism and mediocrity in the arts.'

In 2019, Lobel published Theatre & Cancer, a text aimed at undergraduate and postgraduate students of theatre, performance and disability studies, that challenges conventional perspectives on cancer narratives in theatre by highlighting key works to reconsider 'cancer performance' beyond sentimentality and survivorship.

=== Theatre and performance ===
==== Ball & Other Funny Stories about Cancer (2011) ====
BALL & Other Funny Stories About Cancer is one-person show that brings together works Lobel wrote about his experience with cancer between 2001 and 2011. Lobel refers to the work as a 'cancer comedy', and the work addresses the 'grim subject' of his cancer diagnosis and treatment with a 'light, joyful narrative style'. It has been performed at the Harvard Medical School, NY Academy of Medicine, Cape Town Live Art Festival, Seymour Centre Sydney, Performing Medicine, Contact Manchester, Colchester Arts Centre, Decibel Festival, Camden People's Theatre, and many more. The work is often cited for its warmth and humour in dealing with cancer, with one academic noting that it 'takes the cancer story and gives it a refreshingly new perspective through [Lobel's] unique literary voice and charming embodiment.‘

==== Purge (2011–present) ====
Purge is an interactive performance lecture that 'examines how we emotionally and socially interact with digital media'. Developed with support from Arts Council England, the show explores the process of, and fallout from, Purge, a performance action 'in which strangers voted to keep or delete each of [Lobel's] Facebook friends.' In the work, Lobel invites 'audiences to become co-creators' of the work, and highlights how we make choices about relationships.^{:91} Scholar Bree Hadley has argued that the work's 'spectatorial performances become exemplars for public scrutiny'.^{:91}

==== Fun With Cancer Patients (2013) ====
Lobel's work Fun With Cancer Patients (2013) 'documents 10 areas of cancer treatment including food intake and appetite, the relationship between the starer and the person being looked at, the questions that cancer patients are always asked, and the sounds associated with treatment.'

==== A Pacifist's Guide to the War on Cancer (2016) ====
In 2016 Lobel co-wrote the book for the musical A Pacifist's Guide to the War on Cancer (2016) with Byrony Kimmings. The musical, with a score by Tom Parkinson, premiered at the National Theatre in London.

==== You Have to Forgive Me, You Have to Forgive Me, You Have to Forgive Me (2014–present) ====
Lobel has also created work around the television series Sex and the City, and is a 'self-proclaimed Sex and the City therapist' His interactive performance work, You Have to Forgive Me, You Have to Forgive Me, You Have to Forgive Me requires participants to 'fill in a 94-question questionnaire which asks you to examine your life and relationships through the prism of Sex and the City and Carrie Bradshaw. Lobel then selects an episode from the complete box set of Sex and the City that he thinks will most help you, and you watch it together.' Participants watch the episode in bed with Lobel (either in person, or via skype). Lobel is usually 'pajama clad', and encourages participants to also wear pajamas.

== Themes of his work ==
His work is concerned with 'bodies and body politics', and his performances often intervene 'into the way bodies are culturally stigmatised and marginalised.' He has described solo performance as 'the perfect metaphor for being sick', since it requires one body 'on stage, isolated and vulnerable'.
