= Simon McBurney =

British actor (born 1957)

Simon McBurney OBE
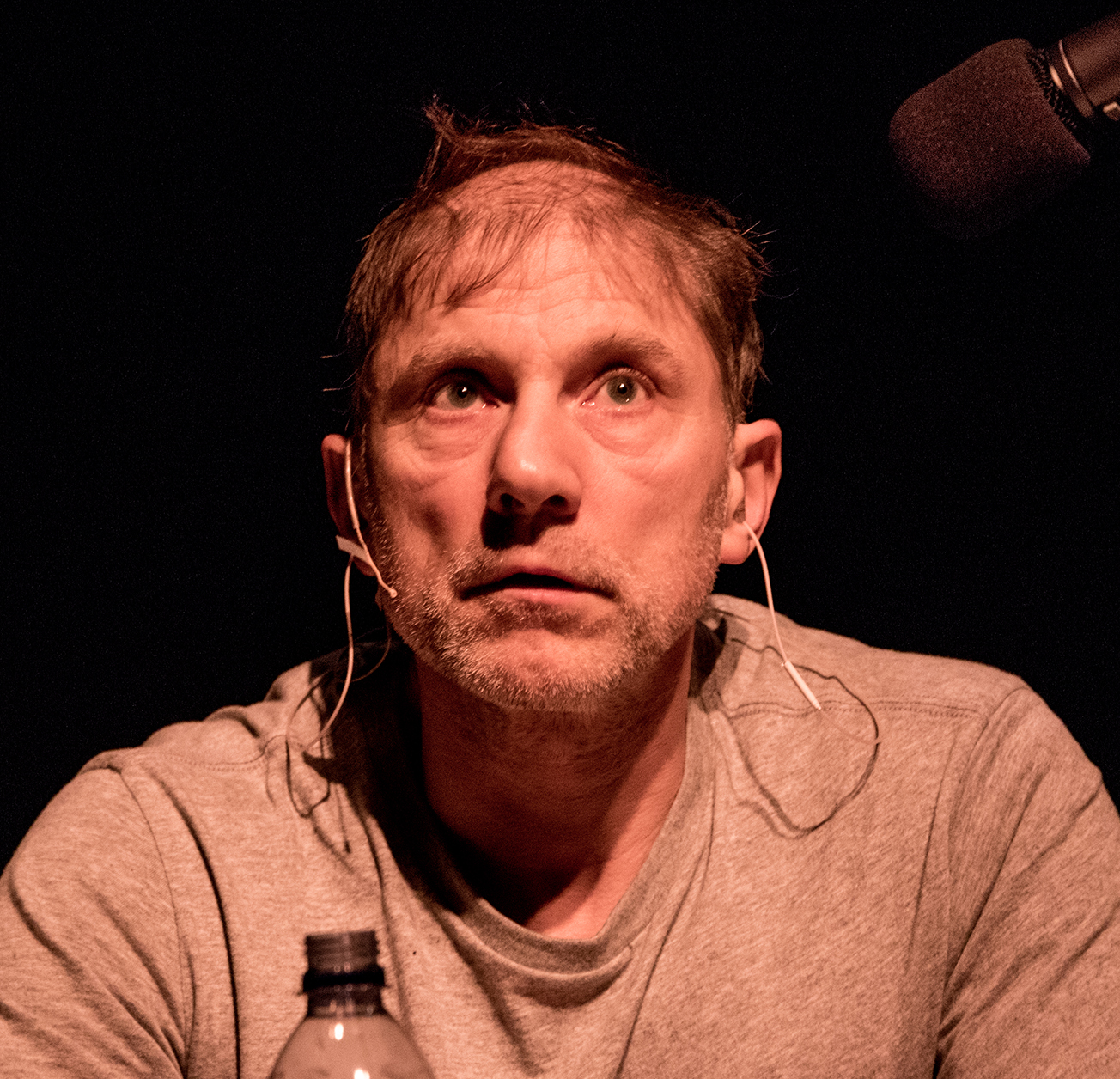
- McBurney in The Encounter 2015
- Born: Simon Montagu McBurney; 25 August 1957 (age 69); Cambridge, England
- Education: Peterhouse, Cambridge; Lecoq International School of Theatre; École Philippe Gaulier
- Occupations: Actor; playwright; director
- Years active: 1988–present
- Partner: Cassie Yukawa
- Children: 2
- Father: Charles McBurney
- Relatives: Gerard McBurney (brother); Charles McBurney (great-grandfather)

Simon Montagu McBurney (born 25 August 1957) is an English actor, playwright, and theatre and opera director. He is the founder and artistic director of the Théâtre de Complicité, London. He has had roles in the films The Manchurian Candidate (2004), Friends with Money, The Last King of Scotland (both 2006), The Golden Compass (2007), The Duchess (2008), Robin Hood, Harry Potter and the Deathly Hallows – Part 1 (both 2010), Tinker Tailor Soldier Spy (2011), Magic in the Moonlight, The Theory of Everything (both 2014), Mission: Impossible – Rogue Nation (2015), and Nosferatu (2024). He played Cecil the choirmaster in BBC's The Vicar of Dibley (1994–2004).

== Early life ==
McBurney was born on 25 August 1957 in Cambridge, England. His father, Charles McBurney, was an American archaeologist and academic of Scottish descent. His paternal great-grandfather was American surgeon Charles McBurney, who was credited with describing the medical sign McBurney's point. Simon McBurney's mother, Anne Francis Edmondstone (née Charles), was a British secretary of English, Scottish and Irish ancestry. His parents were distant cousins who met during World War II. His older brother is composer and writer Gerard McBurney.

He attended Marlborough College and Cambridgeshire College of Art and Technology (now Anglia Ruskin University) before studying English literature at Peterhouse, Cambridge, graduating in 1980. He moved to Paris and trained for the theatre at the Jacques Lecoq Institute and under Philippe Gaulier.

== Career ==
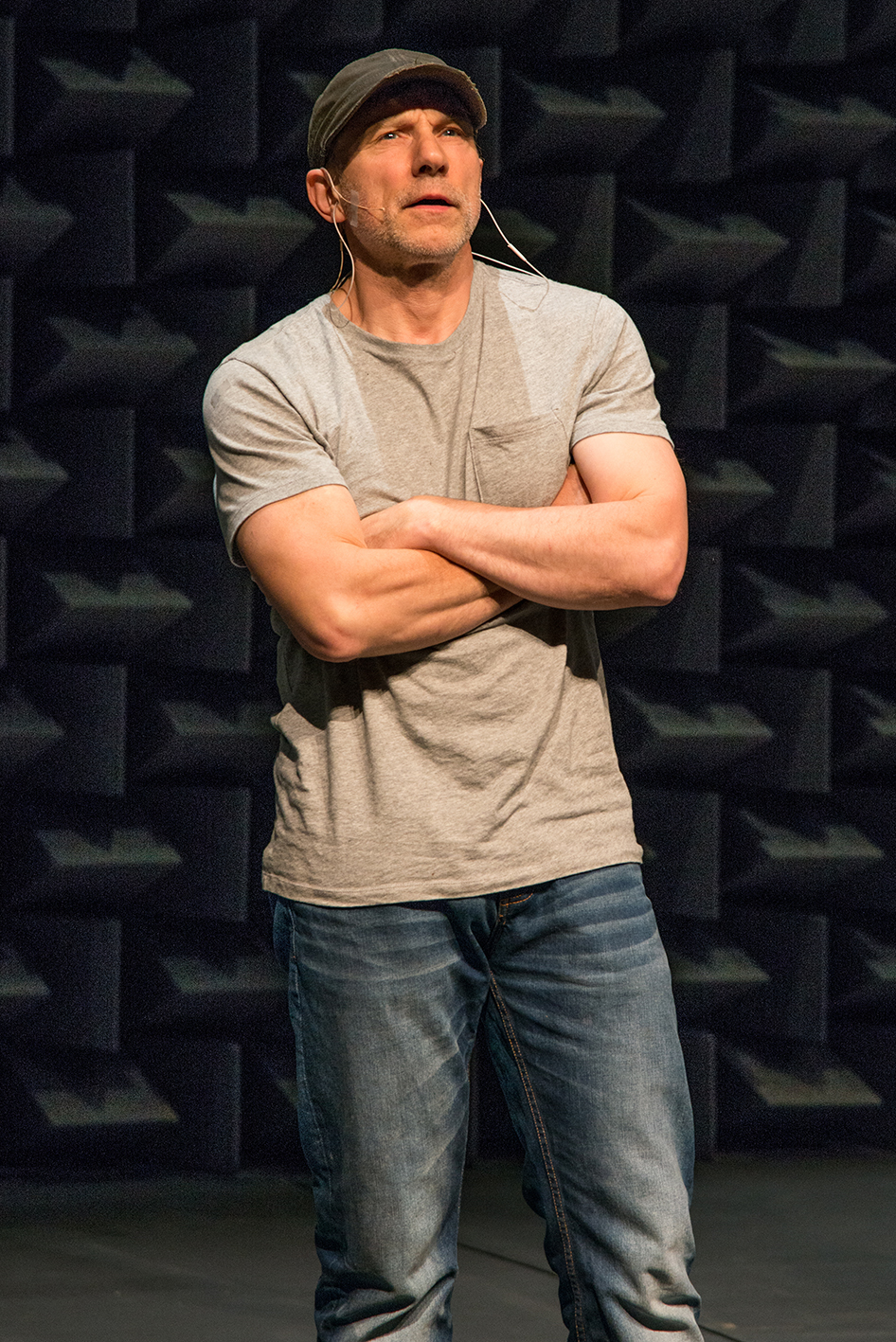
McBurney at the Edinburgh International Festival on 6 August 2015

McBurney is a founder and artistic director of the UK-based theatre company Complicité, which performs throughout the world. In 1997 he was awarded the Europe Prize Theatrical Realities, with the Théâtre de Complicité. He directed their productions of Street of Crocodiles (1992); The Three Lives of Lucie Cabrol (1994), which was adapted from the John Berger trilogy Into Their Labours; To the Wedding (another Berger collaboration); Mnemonic (1999); The Elephant Vanishes (2003); A Disappearing Number (2007); A Dog's Heart (2010); The Master and Margarita (2011), and The Kid Stays in the Picture (2017).

A Disappearing Number was a devised piece conceived and directed by McBurney, taking as its inspiration the story of the collaboration between two of the 20th century's most remarkable pure mathematicians, the Indian genius Srinivasa Ramanujan, and Cambridge don G. H. Hardy. It played at the Barbican in autumn 2008 and toured internationally. In February 2009, McBurney directed the Complicité production Shun-kin, based on two texts by Jun'ichiro Tanizaki. It was produced in London and Tokyo in 2010.

On a freelance basis, McBurney directed the following: The Resistible Rise of Arturo Ui and All My Sons (2008) (both in New York City), and live comedy shows, including Lenny Henry's So Much Things To Say and French and Saunders' Live in 2000.

McBurney is an established screen actor. He played the recurring role of Cecil the choirmaster in The Vicar of Dibley, CIA computer whiz Garland in Body of Lies, Dr. Atticus Noyle in The Manchurian Candidate (2004), British diplomat Nigel Stone in The Last King of Scotland, the metrosexual husband Aaron in Friends with Money, Fra Pavel in The Golden Compass, Charles James Fox in The Duchess, and Oliver Lacon in Tinker Tailor Soldier Spy. He also wrote the story and was an executive producer for Mr. Bean's Holiday.

From 2010 to 2014, he appeared in the BBC comedy television series Rev., portraying the role of Archdeacon Robert. McBurney provided the voice of Kreacher in Harry Potter and the Deathly Hallows – Part 1 (2010). In the series The Borgias, he portrayed the canon law expert Johannes Burchart. He is the Artiste Associé of the 66th Festival d'Avignon (2012). He starred in The Encounter, about photographer Loren McIntyre becoming lost in the Javari Valley in Brazil and his experiences with locals, which premiered at the 2015 Edinburgh International Festival. In July 2015, he starred as Atlee, the director of MI6 in the film Mission: Impossible – Rogue Nation, and in 2016, he portrayed paranormal investigator Maurice Grosse in the horror film sequel The Conjuring 2.

In 2013, he directed the English National Opera production of Mozart's The Magic Flute at the London Coliseum, and the same opera at the New York Metropolitan Opera in 2023.

In September 2019, the Complicité production of The Encounter was ranked by The Guardian writers as the 13th best theatre show since 2000.

== Personal life ==
In 2007, he met concert pianist Cassandra "Cassie" Yukawa; as of 2010 they lived together with their two children. They previously lived in north London. His sister-in-law is violinist Diane Yukawa.

In the 2005 New Year Honours, McBurney was appointed Officer of the Order of the British Empire (OBE) "for services to Drama". He is an Ambassador for Survival International, the global movement for tribal peoples' rights.

== Filmography ==
=== Film ===
Year	Title	Role	Notes	Ref.
1991	Kafka	Assistant Oscar		
1994	A Business Affair	Salesman		
1994	Being Human	Hermas		
1994	Tom & Viv	Dr. Reginald Miller		
1994	Mesmer	Franz		
1996	The Ogre	Brigadier		
1997	The Caucasian Chalk Circle	Azdak the Judge	Video	
1998	Cousin Bette	Vauvinet		
1999	Onegin	Monsieur Triquet		
2000	Eisenstein	Sergei Eisenstein		
2003	Bright Young Things	Sneath (Photo-Rat)		
2003	Skagerrak	Thomas		
2004	The Reckoning	Stephen		
2004	The Manchurian Candidate	Dr. Atticus Noyle		
2004	Human Touch	Bernard		
2006	Friends with Money	Aaron		
2006	The Last King of Scotland	Nigel Stone		
2007	The Golden Compass	Fra Pavel		
2008	Body of Lies	Garland		
2008	The Duchess	Charles James Fox		
2009	Boogie Woogie	Robert Freign		
2010	Robin Hood	Father Tancred		
2010	Harry Potter and the Deathly Hallows – Part 1	Kreacher	Voice	
2011	Jane Eyre	Mr. Brocklehurst		
2011	Tinker Tailor Soldier Spy	Oliver Lacon		
2013	For Those Who Can Tell No Tales	Tim Clancy		
2014	Magic in the Moonlight	Howard Burkan		
2014	The Theory of Everything	Frank Hawking		
2015	Mission: Impossible – Rogue Nation	Director Atlee		
2016	The Conjuring 2	Maurice Grosse		
2016	Allied	S.O.E. Official		
2018	The Mercy	Sir Francis Chichester		
2020	Siberia	Magician		
2020	Wolfwalkers	Lord Protector Oliver Cromwell	Voice	
2022	The Pale Blue Eye	Captain Hitchcock		
2024	A Mistake	Andrew McGrath		
2024	Nosferatu	Herr Knock		
2025	The Actor	Doctor Croft / Doctor Edgarton		
2026	The Betrayers			

=== Television ===
Year	Title	Role	Notes	Ref.
1988	Screenplay	Martin	Episode: "Burning Ambition"	
1989	The Two of Us	The Man	Episode: "Trust"	
1992	The Bill	Shaun Anderton	Episode: "Man of the People"	
1992–1993	The Comic Strip Presents	Mick / Madman	2 episodes	
1994–2004	The Vicar of Dibley	Choirmaster Cecil	4 episodes	
1995	Performance	Ancient Pistol	Episode: "Henry IV"	
1996	Absolutely Fabulous	Conductor	Episode: "The Last Shout (Part 1)"	
1999	Midsomer Murders	Henry Carstairs	Episode: "Death of a Stranger"	
2010–2014	Rev.	Archdeacon Robert	19 episodes	
2011–2013	The Borgias	Johannes Burchart	6 episodes	
2013	Utopia	Christian Donaldson	3 episodes	
2014	Knifeman	Houdyshell	Unsold pilot	
2015	The Casual Vacancy	Colin "Cubby" Wall	Miniseries; 3 episodes	
2019	The Loudest Voice	Rupert Murdoch	Miniseries	
2019–2023	Carnival Row	Runyan Millworthy	Recurring	
2023	Hijack	Edgar	Miniseries	

== Accolades ==
- 1997: Europe Prize Theatrical Realities (with the Théâtre de Complicité)
- 1998: Laurence Olivier Award for Best Theatre Choreographer for "The Caucasian Chalk Circle" ("Der kaukasische Kreidekreis"), Royal National Theatre, Olivier Stage, London)
- 1999: Critics' Circle Theatre Award for Best New Play for "Mnemonic" at the Riverside Theatre)
- 2005: Officer of the Order of the British Empire, "New Years Honours List" of Queen Elizabeth II.
- 2007: Nestroy Theatre Prize (nomination Best Directing for "A Disappearing Number" at the Wiener Festwochen)
- 2007: Critics' Circle Theatre Award for Best New Play for "A Disappearing Number" at the Théâtre de Complicité)
- 2008: Konrad Wolf Prize

Preceded by Sarah Palmer	Footlights Vice President; 1979–1980	Succeeded by Emma Thompson
