= Shunkinshō (opera) =

Opera by Minoru Miki

Shunkinshō (Japanese: 春琴抄, Shunkinshō), "A Portrait of Shunkin", is an opera by Minoru Miki, with Japanese libretto by Jun Maeda (まえだ純, Maeda Jun).

It premiered in Tokyo on 24 November, 1975. It was composed earlier that year. Shunkinshō is based on the novella of the same name by Jun'ichirō Tanizaki (谷崎潤一郎).

The vocal score is published by Zen-On Music Company Ltd.

== Roles ==
Japanese	English	Voice type	Premiere Cast, 1975 (Conductor: Kazuo Yamada 山田一男)
春琴	Shunkin, a blind koto teacher	soprano	Michiko Sunahara (砂原美智子)
佐助	Sasuke, her servant and lover	baritone	Shigeo Harada (原田茂生)
利太郎	Ritarō	tenor	
安左衛門	Yasuzaemon	bass	
しげ女	Shigeme	mezzo-soprano	

== Synopsis ==
Set in 19th-century Osaka, the three-act opera tells the story of a love affair between Sasuke and blind koto teacher Shunkin, with the opposition of Sasuke's rich suitor Ritarō.
