= World revolution (disambiguation) =

World Revolution may refer to one of the following:

- World revolution, a Marxist concept of the overthrow of capitalism that would take place in all countries.
- World Revolution, a song in the SNES game, Chrono Trigger
- World Revolution (party), a British communist group.
- World Revolution, a 1937 book by C. L. R. James
- World Revolution, alternate name for Revolution, a political group
