= Gordon Lewis =

Gordon Lewis may refer to:

- Gordon Lewis (rugby) (born 1936), Welsh rugby union and rugby league footballer
- Gordon Lewis (engineer) (1924–2010), British aeronautical engineer
- Gordon Lewis (producer), Irish–British film producer and author
- Gordon K. Lewis (1919–1991), Welsh radical historian of the Caribbean
