= The Black Jacobins =

1938 book by C. L. R. James

The Black Jacobins: Toussaint l'Ouverture and the San Domingo Revolution
- Cover of the 1st edition
- Author: C. L. R. James
- Subject: Haitian Revolution
- Genre: History
- Published: 1938; 88 years ago
- Publisher: Secker & Warburg Ltd
- Publication place: London, United Kingdom
- Media type: Print

The Black Jacobins: Toussaint L'Ouverture and the San Domingo Revolution is a 1938 book by Trinidadian historian C. L. R. James, and is a history of the Haitian Revolution of 1791–1804.

He went to Paris to research this work, where he met Haitian military historian Alfred Auguste Nemours. James's text places the revolution in the context of the French Revolution, and focuses on the leadership of Toussaint L'Ouverture, who was born a slave but rose to prominence espousing the French Revolutionary ideals of liberty and equality. These ideals, which many French revolutionaries did not maintain consistently with regard to the black humanity of their colonial possessions, were embraced, according to James, with a greater purity by the persecuted blacks of Haiti; such ideals "meant far more to them than to any Frenchman."

James examines the brutal conditions of slavery as well as the social and political status of the slave-owners, poor or "small" whites, and "free" blacks and mulattoes leading up to the Revolution. The book explores the dynamics of the Caribbean economy and the European feudal system during the era before the Haitian Revolution, and places each revolution in comparative historical and economic perspective.

Toussaint L'Ouverture becomes a central and symbolic character in James's narrative of the Haitian Revolution. His complete embodiment of the revolutionary ideals of the period was, according to James, incomprehensible even to the revolutionary French, who did not seem to grasp the urgency of these ideals in the minds and spirits of a people rising from slavery. L'Ouverture had defiantly asserted that he intended "to cease to live before gratitude dies in my heart, before I cease to be faithful to France and to my duty, before the god of liberty is profaned and sullied by the liberticides, before they can snatch from my hands that sword, those arms, which France confided to me for the defence of its rights and those of humanity, for the triumph of liberty and equality."

The French bourgeoisie could not understand this motivation, according to James, and mistook it for rhetoric or bombast. "Rivers of blood were to flow before they understood," James writes.

James wrote in The Black Jacobins that the "cruelties of property and privilege are always more ferocious than the revenges of poverty and oppression. For the one aims at perpetuating resented injustice, the other is merely a momentary passion soon appeased."

== Historical and social context ==
The book was first published in London in 1938 by Secker & Warburg, who had published James's Minty Alley in 1936 and World Revolution in 1937. The impending world war was recognized and alluded to in the text by James, who had been living in England since 1932; in his Preface, he places the writing of the history in the context of "the booming of Franco's heavy artillery, the rattle of Joseph Stalin's firing squads and the fierce shrill revolutionary movement striving for clarity and influence." In a later passage, James writes of the slaves in the early days of French revolutionary violence, the "slaves only watched their masters destroy one another, as Africans watched them in 1914–1918, and will watch them again before long." Of his text, James suggests that "had it been written under different circumstances it would have been a different but not necessarily a better book." He met Alfred Auguste Nemours in Paris while researching the book. Nemours, a Haitian diplomat, had written Histoire militaire de la guerre d'independance de Saint-Domingue in 1925 while Haiti was under US occupation.

The writing of history becomes ever more difficult. The power of God or the weakness of man, Christianity or the divine right of kings to govern wrong, can easily be made responsible for the downfall of states and the birth of new societies. Such elementary conceptions lend themselves willingly to narrative treatment and from Tacitus to Macaulay, from Thuycidides to Green, the traditionally famous historians have been more artist than scientist: they wrote so well because they saw so little. To-day by a natural reaction we tend to a personification of the social forces, great men being merely or nearly instruments in the hands of economic destiny. As so often the truth does not lie in between. Great men make history, but only such history as it is possible for them to make. Their freedom of achievement is limited by the necessities of their environment. To portray the limits of those necessities and the realisation, complete or partial, of all possibilities, that is the true business of the historian.

James's reflections on the context of his writings echo his concerns on the context of the events, as traditionally narrated. The book represents, according to some commentators, a challenge to the conventional "geography" of history, which usually identifies the national histories of states as discrete phenomena, and with "Western civilization" in particular being bounded away from its actual constituent elements. In The Black Jacobins, according to Edward Said, "events in France and in Haiti criss-cross and answer each other like voices in a fugue." "The blacks were taking their part in the destruction of European feudalism", according to James, and, as the workers and peasants of France stiffened in their resistance to local tyranny, they also became passionate abolitionists despite their geographical remove from the French slave enterprise in the Western hemisphere.

The Black Jacobins has been characterized as demonstrating that "the French Revolution was not an insurrectionary experience limited to Europe". Given his origins as a slave in a colonized land, and the unmistakable current of French Revolutionary ideology that he imbibed and upheld, Toussaint L'Ouverture becomes, according to one reading of James, not merely the extraordinary leader of an island revolt, but "the apogee of the revolutionary doctrines that underpinned the French Revolution."

== The text ==
James sets out to offer a view of the events that notes European and white perspectives without leaving them unquestioned. For James, the dismissiveness and marginalization that the slaves' revolutionary efforts faced was not only a problem of latter-day historiography, but a problem at every historical moment back to and throughout the revolution. While Toussaint L'Ouverture set out to defend and maintain the dignity of man as he garnered it from French revolutionary literature, and particularly Raynal, according to James, "Feuillants and Jacobins in France, Whites and Mulattoes in San Domingo (Saint-Domingue), were still looking upon the slave revolt as a huge riot which would be put down in time, once the division between the slave-owners was closed." The narrative of the Haitian Revolution had been, according to James, largely dominated by distant, foreign, or opportunist narrators, who opted for their own preferred emphases. On this plasticity of historical narrative, James opines of the French Revolution, "Had the monarchists been white, the bourgeoisie brown, and the masses of France black, the French Revolution would have gone down in history as a race war."

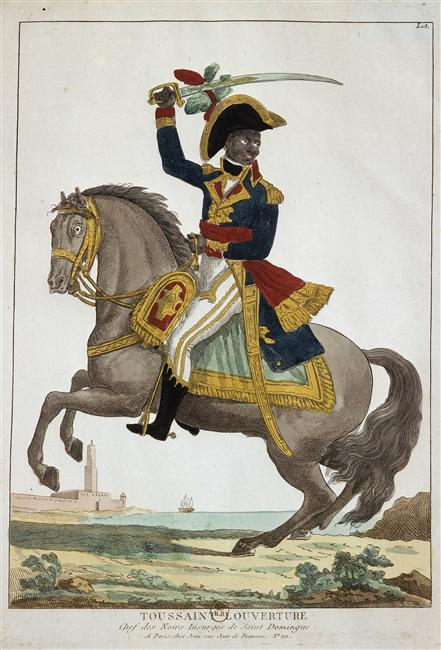
Toussaint L'Ouverture, as depicted in a 19th-century print.

Toussaint L'Ouverture is a central figure in James's telling of the Haitian Revolution. Although born a slave, James writes of Toussaint, "both in body and mind he was far beyond the average slave". Toussaint joined the revolution after its onset and was immediately regarded as a leader, organizing the Haitian people into a force capable of breaking the French hold on the colony of San Domingo. He emerged both as a powerful, unifying symbol of the march of enslaved Africans toward liberty, and as an extraordinary politician: "superbly gifted, he incarnated the determination of his people never, never to be slaves again." James emphasizes the writing and thought of Toussaint, and quotes him at length, in order to demonstrate the man as he existed politically, often in contrast, according to James, to what has been written about him. James believes that Toussaint's own words best convey his personality and genius, which was all the more remarkable given its unlikely origins:

Pericles, Tom Paine, Jefferson, Marx and Engels, were men of a liberal education, formed in the traditions of ethics, philosophy and history. Toussaint was a slave, not six years out of slavery, bearing alone the unaccustomed burden of war and government, dictating his thoughts in the crude words of a broken dialect, written and rewritten by his secretaries until their devotion and his will had hammered them into adequate shape.

In one letter that James quotes at length, sent by Toussaint to the Directory at a time when French colonists were conspiring to restore the slave system, Toussaint wrote that liberty was being assailed by the colonists under "the veil of patriotism":

Already perfidious emissaries have stepped in among us to ferment the destructive leaven prepared by the hands of liberticides. But they will not succeed. I swear it by all that liberty holds most sacred. My attachment to France, my knowledge of the blacks, make it my duty not to leave you ignorant either of the crimes which they meditate or the oath that we renew, to bury ourselves under the ruins of a country revived by liberty rather than suffer the return of slavery.

In the 1980 foreword to the British edition published by Allison & Busby, James explains that he was "specially prepared to write The Black Jacobins", having grown up in Trinidad and having researched the Russian revolution in depth while studying Marxism in England. In this foreword, written 42 years after the work's first publication, James discusses his own background, his reasons for chronicling the history, and major people who influenced the work. He stated that he hoped others would elaborate on his research. Aware of some of the attacks on his book, James felt that no one could dispute the accuracy of his history; he "was never worried about what they would find, confident that [his] foundation would remain imperishable".

Of his text on "the only successful slave revolt in history", James writes: "I made up my mind that I would write a book in which Africans or people of African descent instead of constantly being the object of other peoples' exploitation and ferocity would themselves be taking action on a grand scale and shaping other people to their own needs". James writes sceptically of British efforts to suppress the slave trade by using William Wilberforce as a figurehead. James asserts that the actual concern of the British was strategic, and that their humanitarian interest in abolishing slavery was in actuality a pragmatic interest, in that it undermined the French by crippling access to slave labour for France's most lucrative colonies.

=== Editions ===
- 1938 — London: Secker & Warburg
- 1963 — New York: Vintage Books/Random House, with Appendix "From Toussaint L'Ouverture to Fidel Castro"
- 1980 — London: Allison and Busby, with new foreword by C. L. R. James
- 2011 — Penguin Books, with Introduction and Notes by James Walvin

== Critical response ==
Literary critics have esteemed The Black Jacobins since its first publication in 1938. In a 1940 review, Ludwell Lee Montague asserts that James "finds his way with skill through kaleidoscopic sequences of events in both Haiti and France, achieving clarity where complexities of class, color, and section have reduced others to vague confusion". Another reviewer, W. G. Seabrook, heralds James's work as "a public service for which he merits the attention due a scholar who blazes the way in an all but neglected field". Seabrook proceeds to predict the importance of the work to Caribbean history, and the probable extensive circulation of the book. Decades after the first publication of the work, The Black Jacobins remained a prominent artifact of Caribbean cultural history.

James looks more broadly at the West Indies in his 1963 appendix to the text, "From Toussaint L’Ouverture to Fidel Castro". In the appendix James considers patterns between later developments in the Caribbean and the Haitian revolution. Literary critic Santiago Valles summarizes what James attempts to do in the appendix: "In an appendix to the second edition, James noted intellectual and social movements in Cuba, Haiti and Trinidad during the 1920s and 1930s. First in Cuba, Haiti (1927), then in Brazil, Surinam and Trinidad (1931), other small groups faced the challenge of coming to terms with events which disrupted their understanding and connectedness to the wider world by revealing the relations of force."

Historians still continue to comment on the significance of the work and how it has paved the way for more detailed study of social and political movements in the Caribbean region. In a look at the role slaves themselves have played in Caribbean and American rebellions Adélékè Adéèkó points specifically to the influence of The Black Jacobins on the perception of slaves in The Slaves Rebellion. In this work, published in 2005, Adéèkó suggests: "The Black Jacobins stirs this high level of inspiration for its symbolic reconfiguration of the slaves’ will to freedom."

Some critics have accused the book of being partisan, in its glorification of the struggle against slavery and colonialism, or in its ideological bent. According to Montague, "The author's sympathies and frame of reference are evident, but he tells his story with more restraint than can generally be found in works on this subject by others less plainly labeled". Adéèkó suggests that "James' work is radical, conceived with a Marxist framework, and favors the search for determinative factors within social dialects". Thomas O. Ott also fixes on James's association with a Marxist framework, suggesting that James's "stumbling attempt to connect the Haitian and French revolutions through some sort of common mass movement is a good example of 'fact trimming' to fit a particular thesis or ideology." Both recent and contemporary reviewers agree that James's view (and critique) of extant historiography make the work extremely valuable in the study of Caribbean history.

== The Black Jacobins as drama ==
In 1934, James wrote a play about the Haitian Revolution, Toussaint Louverture: The Story of the Only Successful Slave Revolt in History, which was performed in 1936 at London's Westminster Theatre, with Paul Robeson in the title role. The play was significant in bringing the Haitian Revolution to the attention of the British public. The play has been published as a 2023 graphic novel by Verso Books, having been adapted by artists Nic Watts and Sakina Karimjee.

In 1967, James revised the play with the help of Dexter Lyndersay and his new play, The Black Jacobins, has been performed internationally subsequently, including a radio adaptation broadcast on BBC Radio 4 on 13 December 1971, with Earl Cameron as Toussaint L'Ouverture.

In 1986, The Black Jacobins play was performed in London at the Riverside Studios, in the first production from Talawa Theatre Company, with an all-black cast including Norman Beaton as Toussaint L'Ouverture, directed by Yvonne Brewster.

In 2018, it was announced that the book was going to be made into a television programme thanks to Bryncoed Productions, with the assistance of Kwame Kwei-Armah.

== Sources and further reading ==
- Adéèkó, Adélékè (2005). The Slave's Rebellion: Literature, History, Orature. New York: Indiana University Press.
- Dalleo, Raphael (2014). "'The independence so hardly won has been maintained': C.L.R. James and the U.S. Occupation of Haiti". Cultural Critique. 87: 38–59. doi:10.5749/culturalcritique.87.2014.0038. S2CID 140362980.
- Figueroa, Víctor (2006). "The Kingdom of Black Jacobins: C. L. R. James and Alejo Carpentier on the Haitian Revolution". Afro-Hispanic Review. 25 (2): 55–71, 227. JSTOR 23055334.
- Forsdick, Charles; Høgsbjerg, Christian, eds. (2017). The Black Jacobins Reader. Durham, NC: Duke University Press.
- Høgsbjerg, Christian (2014). C.L.R. James in Imperial Britain. Durham, NC: Duke University Press.
- Høgsbjerg, Christian (2016). "'The Fever and the Fret': C.L.R. James, the Spanish Civil War and the Writing of The Black Jacobins" (PDF). Critique: Journal of Socialist Theory. 44 (1–2): 161–177. doi:10.1080/03017605.2016.1187858. S2CID 147908021.
- James, C. L. R. (1938). The Black Jacobins (PDF). London: Secker & Warburg.
- Montague, Ludwell L. (1940). "The Black Jacobins. Toussaint L'Ouverture and the San Domingo Revolution. by Cyril Lionel Robert James". Review. The Hispanic American Historical Review. 20 (1): 129–130. doi:10.2307/2507494. JSTOR 2507494.
- Santiago-Valles, W. F. (2003). "C. L. R. James: Asking Questions of the Past". Race & Class. 45 (1): 61–78. doi:10.1177/0306396803045001003. S2CID 145376669.
- Seabrook, W. G. (1939). "The Black Jacobins by C. L. R. James". Review. The Journal of Negro History. 24 (1): 125–127. doi:10.2307/2714508. JSTOR 2714508.
- Scott, David (2004). Conscripts of Modernity: The Tragedy of Colonial Enlightenment. Durham, NC: Duke University Press.
- Smith, Ashley (January 2009). "The Black Jacobins – A review of C. L. R. James's classic account of Haiti's slave revolt". ISR (International Socialist Review) (63).
- Sweeney, Fionnghuala (2011). "The Haitian Play. CLR James' Toussaint Louverture (1936)". International Journal of Francophone Studies. 14 (1–2): 143–163. doi:10.1386/ijfs.14.1-2.143_1.
- Suttles Jr., William C. (1971). "African Religious Survivals as Factors in American Slave Revolts". The Journal of Negro History. 56 (2): 97–104. doi:10.2307/2716232. JSTOR 2716232. S2CID 149485699.
- Yang, Manuel (3 February 2008). "The Black Jacobins 70 Years Later". Monthly Review Online. Monthly Review Press.
