= Louise Cripps Samoiloff =

British-American author (1904–2001)

- Born: 13 December 1904; London, England
- Died: 21 September 2001 (aged 96); Dorado, Puerto Rico
- Education: University College London
- Occupations: Writer, journalist, historian and editor
- Spouse(s): Bernard Glemser (m. 1932, divorced) Leon A. Samoiloff (m. 1946)
- Children: 1

Louise Cripps Samoiloff (13 December 1904 – 21 September 2001) was a British-born writer, journalist, historian and editor who became an American citizen and wrote several books advocating the case for the independence of Puerto Rico.

== Biography ==
Louise Cripps was born in London, England, in 1904, into a middle-class family. She studied journalism at University College London during the mid-1920s and aimed to become a literary writer, though found work in London as a journalist and editor working for various publications including Nursery World and British Vogue. Politically radicalising during the Great Depression and the rise of fascism in Europe, she became a Marxist in the early 1930s, joining the tiny British Trotskyist movement and working in the Marxist Group.

During the Second World War, she moved to New York and worked for the British War Relief Society, editing a publication Salute: a tribute to courage for British War Relief, and published her first book Your first baby! (1943). After the war she continued to work as a journalist and publisher, editing an American publication Baby Post. In the 1960s, she moved for her retirement to Puerto Rico, where she wrote many books about the island and putting the case for independence, as well as other works of history and a novel, Lirazel.

Over the course of her life, Cripps knew many key intellectual figures of the twentieth century, including C. L. R. James (with whom she had a relationship during the 1930s), Bertrand Russell, John Dewey, George Grosz, Dr. Benjamin Spock, Harold Laski, Gordon K. Lewis, Norman Thomas, G. K. Chesterton, Havelock Ellis, Izrael Hieger and Earle Birney.

Her first marriage was to the writer Bernard Glemser, whom she married in early 1932 and with whom she had one son, Martin, before marrying Leon A. Samoiloff, a Russian-born Harvard-educated man in 1946.

She died at her home in Dorado, Puerto Rico, on 21 September 2001.

== Publications ==
Books

- Glemser, Louise Cripps (1943). Your first baby! Modern methods of care and feeding and a personalised baby record book. New York: A.S. Barnes.
- Cripps Samoiloff, Louise (1969). Discovering Puerto Rico. Philadelphia, United States: Whitmore Publishing Co.
- Cripps, Louise (1974). Puerto Rico: The Case for Independence. Cambridge, MA: Schenkman.
- Cripps, Louise (1979). The Spanish Caribbean: From Columbus to Castro. Boston: G.K. Hall.
- Cripps, Louise (1982). Human Rights in a U.S. Colony. Cambridge, MA: Schenkman.
- Cripps Samoiloff, Louise (1984). A Portrait of Puerto Rico. London: Cornwall.
- Cripps Samoiloff, Louise (1987). Puerto Rico: an island Christopher Columbus discovered 500 years ago. Dorado, Puerto Rico: Borinquen Books.
- Cripps Samoiloff, Louise (1987). Calamity in the Caribbean: Puerto Rico and the Bomb. Cambridge, MA: Schenkman.
- Cripps Samoiloff, Louise (1987). The Russian Eagle: A History of Russia from Its Origins to the End of the Romanoff Dynasty. New York: Revisionist Press.
- Cripps Samoiloff, Louise (1997). Lirazel. London: Cornwall.
- Cripps, Louise (1997). C.L.R. James: Memories and Commentaries. London: Cornwall.
- Cripps Samoiloff, Louise (1998). Should Puerto Rico become the 51st state?. Dorado, Puerto Rico: Borinquen Books.
