= Dorothy Pizer =

British working-class anti-racist activist, secretary and publishing worker

- Born: c. 1906; London, England
- Died: 22 November 1964 (aged 57–58); Accra, Ghana
- Other name: Dorothy Padmore
- Occupations: Anti-racist activist, secretary and publishing worker.
- Notable work: Co-authored with George Padmore, How Russia Transformed her Colonial Empire (1946)
- Partner: George Padmore

Dorothy Pizer or Dorothy Padmore (c.1906 – 22 November 1964) was a British working-class anti-racist activist, secretary and publishing worker. In the 1940s and 1950s she was the partner, supporter and collaborator of Pan-African activist and Communist George Padmore.

== Life ==
The daughter of a tailor who had left school at 15, Dorothy Pizer grew up in a household without books in London's East End. Since she had been too poor to accept a scholarship, her education was limited. Yet she later learnt stenography, became a business secretary, and became fluent in French.

Pizer's brother was a member of the Communist Party of Great Britain (CPGB), and she became involved with the CPGB in the 1930s. Through party contacts she met George Padmore in 1937, and by the end of World War II the pair were living together. She was always treated as Padmore's wife, although they were never formally married, and he had a former wife, Julia Semper. Dorothy supported the couple financially by continuing to work as a secretary during the day. She typed the manuscript of C. L. R. James's book World Revolution (1937), and also typed manuscripts for her husband.

Publishing was one of the main strategies adopted by black intellectuals in challenging the foundations of British colonial rule, and Pizer's skills enabled her to play an important role in this global political struggle:

She has been praised for her tireless work as a secretary to provide a living for Padmore, her typing efforts on his manuscripts, and her reputation as a consummate hostess and excellent chef for the revolving door of African and West Indian nationalists who came to their home. Yet she was much more than this. Their relationship was both a practical and an intellectual partnership. It was a companionship in which ideas could be debated and strategies worked out.

She transcribed the conversations between Padmore and Nancy Cunard on race relations and decolonisation that became their pamphlet The White Man's Duty: An Analysis of the Colonial Question in the Light of the Atlantic Charter (London: W. H. Allen & Co., 1942). In 1946, How Russia Transformed her Colonial Empire was published by Dennis Dobson as a collaboration between Pizer and Padmore, with her name appearing on the title page.

From 1941 to 1957 the Padmores shared a flat at 22 Cranleigh Street in Camden, London. It became a mecca for visiting pan-Africanists and leftists including Kwame Nkrumah, Eric Williams, Jomo Kenyatta, and Joe Appiah. The Padmores first met Richard Wright and his wife in 1947, and over the next decade the couples often visited each other in London and Paris. In 1953 Dorothy persuaded Wright to visit the Gold Coast, where George had already started advising Kwame Nkrumah in his plans for its independence as Ghana.

Dorothy herself visited the Gold Coast for the first time in 1954, and in 1957 the Padmores moved to Ghana permanently as special advisers to Kwame Nkrumah. At the time of her husband's premature death in 1959, Dorothy Padmore was visiting W. E. B. Du Bois and his wife Shirley in New York. Dorothy returned to Accra for her husband's state funeral, in which his ashes were buried at Christiansborg Castle, and she continued to live in Ghana as an adviser to Nkrumah. She planned but never completed a biography of her husband, collecting notes and papers relating to him. According to historian Leslie James, the unfinished biography of Padmore that C. L. R, James had hoped to write maintained that "Padmore was the man he was because of the tremendous assistance he had from Dorothy."

On 22 November 1964, aged 58, she died in Accra from a heart attack. After her death, Nkrumah took some of the papers that she had collected relating to her husband, and the papers subsequently made their way to Howard University.

== Legacy ==
A plaque commemorating George Padmore was installed outside their former flat in 2011, organised by the Nubian Jak Community Trust. Selma James, the widow of C. L. R. James, spoke honouring Dorothy as well as George at the unveiling:

Every anti-colonial activist organizing against British imperialism came [here].... George and Dorothy would give dinners to all the people who came to them. They were in the struggle together for many years – dedicated internationalists and socialists.

== Works ==
- "How Blacks Fought for Freedom", International African Opinion, Vol. 1. No. 4 (October 1938), p. 11.
- "A Lesson in Revolution" (review of C. L. R. James, The Black Jacobins), Controversy, Vol. 38 (January 1939), pp. 318–20.
- (with George Padmore) How Russia Transformed her Colonial Empire: A Challenge to the Imperialist Powers, London: Dennis Dobson, 177 pages, 1946.
- "Centenary of a Black Republic", Socialist Leader, 16 August 1947.
