= Glemser =

Glemser is a surname. Notable people with the surname include:

- Bernard Glemser (1908–1990), British writer
- Bernd Glemser (born 1962), German pianist
- Dieter Glemser (1938-2026), German touring car racing driver
- Peter Glemser (born 1940), German cyclist
