= Mary Stanley Low =

British political activist and poet (1912–2007)

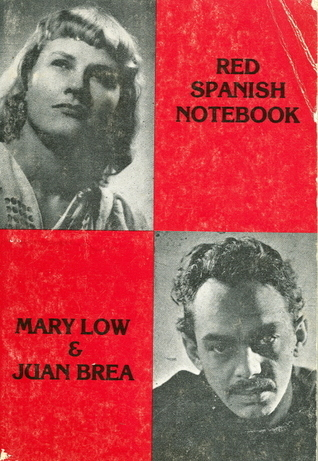
- Born: 14 May 1912 London, England
- Died: 9 January 2007 (aged 94) Miami, Florida, US
- Occupation: political activist, poet, Latin teacher
- Citizenship: Cuba
- Genre: Surrealism
- Notable works: Red Spanish Notebook: the first six months of revolution and the civil war
- Notable awards: Rubén Martínez Villena Prize
- Spouse: Juan Breá (m. 1937, died 1941); Armando Machado (m. 1944, died 1982)
- Children: 3

Mary Stanley Low (14 May 1912 – 9 January 2007) was a British and Cuban political activist, Trotskyist, surrealist poet, artist and Latin teacher. She is most known for the book Red Spanish Notebook: the first six months of revolution and the civil war.

== Early life ==
Low was born in 1912 in London, England, to Australian parents. She had a sister named Patricia.

Low was educated in France and Switzerland, spoke English, French and Spanish, and travelled with her parents in Europe as a child.

In her early career, Low worked as a Latin teacher, wrote for English magazines and edited Classics Chronicles, a biannual magazine dedicated to the Latin language and the history of Rome.

== Activism in Europe ==
Low met the Cuban surrealist poet Juan Ramón Breá (1905–1941) in 1933 in Paris. They befriended members of the French surrealist movement, such as the painter Óscar Domínguez, the painter Wifredo Lam and the poet Benjamin Péret. The couple became lovers and travelled extensively throughout Europe, including trips to Prague, Vienna, Belgrade, Istanbul, Bucharest, Brussels and London, and visited Breá's native Cuba. In 1934, during their visit to Bucharest, they campaigned with Victor Brauner for the Romanian Communist Party.

Low and Breá travelled to Barcelona, in August 1936, following the military uprising against the Spanish Republic in July 1936 and crossed into Spain from Aragon, France. Low had won a considerable sum of money in a Monaco casino just before travelling to Spain, and put some of the money towards funding the publication of The Spanish Revolution newspaper.

During the revolutionary period Low and Breá supported the Workers' Party of Marxist Unification (Spanish: Partido Obrero de Unificación Marxista, POUM; Catalan: Partit Obrer d'Unificació Marxista, POUM). Low enrolled as a militiawoman in the female regiment "Lenin's Column", later known as the 29th Division. She worked as an English-language announcer for the POUM radio station in Barcelona, translated POUM publications such as The Spanish Revolution newspaper into English for international circulation and produced propaganda imagery. She was paid twelve pesetas a day. When she encountered members of the English press, she criticised them for observing rather than participating in the revolutionary struggle and described them as "a poor, grey looking group." She also negotiated in English and German.

Low and Breá lived in Spain until December 1936 and during these five months Breá was imprisoned twice. Towards the end of their time in Spain, Low observed the "changing aspect" in the atmosphere as revolution began to fade in Catalonia. They both fled back to France when they were threatened with death by Stalinists. Low wrote when leaving Spain, which she called "the centre pivot of the world," that "the regret came up bitter in my mouth." When leaving Spain, she was reluctant to give up her revolver but sent it to a friend in Barcelona.

In England, Low and Breá co-wrote the Red Spanish Notebook: the first six months of revolution and the civil war, published by Secker and Warburg, which was the first English language written testimony and political analysis of the 1936 Spanish revolution. Mary wrote her chapters and translated chapters written by Breá into English, and they each signed the chapters that they had written. The book was forwarded by the Marxist historian and critic Cyril Lionel Robert James, and was praised by the author and journalist George Orwell in a review for Time and Tide magazine. It was reissued in 1979 by City Lights Books, with a new introduction written by Eugenio Fernandez Granell.

In the book, Low disputed claims that milicianas were mostly concerned with their appearance, recounted the burial of the anarchist leader Buenaventura Durruti after his death in November 1936, and noted her experiences of the bureaucratic culture of politicians of the Catalan government in contrast to the "egalitarian" mood on the street. Low's chapters also praised the efforts of the POUM Women’s Secretariat in establishing courses for women on the subjects of "socialism, child welfare, French, hygiene, women’s rights, the origin of the religious and family sense" and which taught them "to knit and sew and make flags." She also critiqued the dominance of the male hierarchy in the Spanish political sphere and ensured that the book covered women's perspectives on the revolution, reflecting that "Spanish women were anxious to grab their liberty."

Low and Breá married on 24 September 1937 in London, and lived in Prague from 1938 to early 1940. Here, they befriended Czech surrealists including Toyen, Bohuslav Brouk and Jindřich Heisler. During this period they also co-wrote the French language book of surrealist poetry La Saison des flûtes, which was released by Editions Surréalistes of Paris.

Low and Breá witnessed the occupation of the streets of Prague by Nazi German troops in the early period of World War II. In February 1940, Low and Breá emigrated to Cuba from Europe, after obtaining safe-conduct papers through their acquaintance with a German cultural attaché who was a member of the nobility. Not long after the couple settled in Cuba, Breá died in 1941, aged 35.

== Life in Cuba ==
After her husband’s death, Low remained in Cuba for almost 25 years. Low gave talks at the Havana Institute of Marxist Culture, taught at the Instituto de El Vedado, the Universidad de la Habana, and taught English at the Community House. In 1943, she published a selection of political and cultural essays forwarded by her friend Benjamin Péret. Also that year she edited La Verdad Contemporanea, the first work of surrealist theory published in the Caribbean.

In 1944, Low married for a second time to Armando Machado (1911–1982), a Trotskyist Cuban trade-union leader, gaining Cuban citizenship. She retained her British citizenship, holding dual nationality. They had three daughters together, Helga, Yoty and Yara. Armando Machado died from lung cancer in 1982.

In 1954, Low won the Rubén Martínez Villena Prize. She next published the poetry volume Tres voces – Three Voices – Trois Vois in 1957, which was a trilingual book illustrated by José Mijares.

In the 1950s, Low supported the Cuban revolution by helping and hiding revolutionary militants opposed to the Batista regime in her home. By 1964, Low had become frustrated with what she viewed as the Stalinisation of Fidel Castro's Cuban government. Her husband was arrested, although he was quickly released.

== Life in America ==
In 1964, Low moved to live in Australia for ten years, before settling in Florida, United States, where she contributed to the growing American surrealist movement. Low published several works of poetry in America, including Alive in Spite Of (1981), A voice in Three Mirrors (1984) and Where the Wolf Sings (1994). She also wrote the historical novel In Caesar’s Shadow (1975) and produced surrealist collages which were exhibited in Paris, Chicago and Montreal. Low also taught Latin at the private school Gulliver Academy. She retired from teaching in 2000.

Low remained politically active to the end of her life. In July 1999, she was a signatory of the Manifesto “Combat for History”. In October 2002 she was one of the signatories to the Surrealist-sponsored declaration Poetry Matters: On the Media Persecution of Amiri Baraka.

She died of congestive heart failure in 2007 in Miami, Florida. Her body was cremated and her ashes were scattered in Paris and Santiago de Cuba.

== Selected works ==
- Red Spanish Notebook: the first six months of revolution and the civil war (1937)
- La Saison des flûtes (1939)
- La Verdad Contemporanea (1943, editor)
- Tres voces – Three Voices – Trois Vois (1957)
- Alive in Spite Of (1981)
- A voice in Three Mirrors (1984)
- Where the Wolf Sings (1994)
