= Nemours Auguste =

Haitian diplomat

Nemours Auguste (1850-1915) was a Haitian diplomat.

In 1912 he was Chargé d'Affaires to Jacques Nicolas Leger, Secretary of State. He was the father of Alfred Auguste Nemours.

== Writings ==
- Sur le choix d'une discipline, l'anglo-saxonne ou la française, 2 editions (1909) and (1986)
- Etude hygiénique sur l'usage de la flanelle en Contact direct avec la pea (1874)
- Correspondence with Marian Anderson, n.d.
- Le dernier outrage : Monsieur Thoby et Boyer Bazelais (1884)
- Les adversaires des chemins de fer d'Haïti (1895)
- Les adversaires des chemins de fer d'Haïti. Numéro 2 (1895)
