= Pam Fraser Solomon =

British producer and director

Pam Fraser Solomon FRSA
- Born: Guyana
- Education: Middlesex University (M.A.)
- Occupations: Producer and director
- Organization: Mountview Academy of Theatre Arts
- Notable credit: BBC Radio

Pam Fraser Solomon is a British producer and director of Guyanese heritage, whose work spans four decades in theatre, radio, film, television and education, winning prizes such as the Commission for Racial Equality "Race in the Media Award" in 1999. She worked for 16 years with BBC Radio, where she was a senior producer. Her career in fringe and repertory theatre includes working for venues such as the Sheffield Crucible and the Theatre Royal Stratford East, and she is currently the Head of Creative Producing at Mountview drama school.

== Background ==
Born in Guyana and raised in London, England, Pam Fraser Solomon holds a master's degree from Middlesex University. Her early career included work in fringe and repertory theatre, with venues such as the Sheffield Crucible, the Theatre Royal Stratford East and the Haymarket Theatre, and as a director for theatre companies Temba and BTC (Black Theatre Co-operative) in the 1980s. Bonnie Greer quoted Fraser Solomon in a 2006 Guardian article as saying: "In those days, black theatre was the new kid on the block, surviving from production to production or, if you were very lucky, season to season....The difference between black theatre and the rest was that many of us had degrees in drama or English, even physics – but we didn't dress the stage with it. You didn't have to be into theatre to make black theatre, and black theatre didn't always happen in black theatre spaces. But oddly, everyone knew exactly what they were talking about when they said 'black theatre'. Often we were expected to be 'black' and produce something alternative, preferably 'ghetto'. Funding bodies could ask you to be 'theatre' today and 'black' tomorrow. It was shifting sands."

Speaking of how her Guyanese heritage and the experience of growing up in London as a Black woman has impacted her work, Fraser Solomon has said: "People like me with experiences that can inform characterisation and storytelling, subtly changing the emphasis, can lead drama away from comfort zones. This doesn't make me better than others, but it makes my contribution equally valid. I see the world through the eyes of a Black woman, so in that sense all my intuition eventually leads back to that fact."

From 1991, Fraser Solomon was for 16 years a senior producer with BBC Radio, where she directed more than a hundred hours of audio dramas, and she was involved in major arts events such as the Africa95 and Africa '05 festivals, as well as the 2007 Abolition commemoration season. She wrote and produced for BBC Radio 4 in January 2001 the programme Stealing the Glory, about the Arctic explorer Matthew Henson, presented by Colin Salmon.

Her television drama work encompasses producing several episodes of EastEnders and Holby City, and she was the development producer for the BBC short film One Night In White Satin. She was an executive producer of the 2007 BBC2 television documentary In Search of Wilberforce, presented by Moira Stuart.

Also in 2007, Fraser Solomon produced on BBC Radio 3 The Lamplighter, by Jackie Kay, who has written about the commissioning of the work for the season marking the bicentenary of the Slave Trade Act 1807: "After we had finished recording The Lamplighter, we sat around talking about the complex business of what we remember and what we forget. Pam Fraser Solomon said that her great grandmother, whose mother had been born enslaved, often had an enigmatic expression on her face. She'd say: 'I'm just listening to where the breeze is coming from.' I thought of all the silences - the silences from African people who do not want their children to hear about slavery, and from white people who do not want to discuss the family tree with its roots in a plantation in the Caribbean."

Continuing her career as a freelance producer, director and script editor, Fraser Solomon was involved in projects including the production of the documentary film Divided by Race, United in War and Peace, about Caribbean war veterans and their struggles against colour prejudice and racism. She took up the position of Head of MA Creative Producing at Mountview Academy of Theatre Arts in 2018. She is also Co-Chair of Theatre Deli. Addressing the "[m]ismatch between BAME stories and performances when compared to presence in the boardroom, she has written: "Organisations should examine internal structures that block gateways to leadership reflective of ethos and mission statement."

Among her awards as a producer/director are a 1999 Commission for Racial Equality "Race in the Media Award" (RIMA) for Radio Drama as director of Margaret Busby's play based on C. L. R. James's 1936 novel Minty Alley, first broadcast on BBC Radio 4 in June 1998, featuring Geff Francis, Vivienne Rochester and Burt Caesar.

Fraser Solomon has served as a judge for prizes including The Whickers Radio & Audio Funding Award (RAFA) in 2020.

== Selected work ==
=== Theatre ===
- 1990: Zindika, Paper and Stone — director (Black Theatre Co-operative, at the Albany Empire)

=== Radio ===
- 1995: Ama Ata Aidoo, Anowa — director (BBC Radio 3, The Sunday Play)
- 1995: Henry Louis Gates Jr., Colored People (memoir), abridged by Margaret Busby, read by Henry Louis Gates — producer (BBC Radio 4, five parts)
- 1995: A. S. Byatt, Gode's Story, read by Sheila Mitchell — producer
- 1995: Bola Makanjuola, Afternoon Play: Mule — director (BBC Radio 4, Afternoon Play)
- 1996: C. L. R. James, Beyond a Boundary, abridged by Margaret Busby, read by Trevor McDonald — producer (BBC Radio 4, five parts)
- 1996: Nana Anto-Awuakye, Grinning from Ear to Ear, presented by Clarke Peters — producer (BBC Radio 4)
- 1996: Ntozake Shange, Spell Number 7, adapted by Bonnie Greer, "The Monday Play" — producer (BBC Radio 3)
- 1996: Walter Mosley, Devil in a Blue Dress, abridged by Margaret Busby, read by Paul Winfield — producer (BBC Radio 4, The Late Book, 10 parts)
- 1996: Ken Saro-Wiwa, Dilemma, short story, read by Claire Benedict — producer (BBC Radio 4)
- 1997: James Baldwin, "Going To Meet the Man", read by Paul Winfield — producer (BBC Radio 4, The Late Book, two parts)
- 1997: Paul Beatty, The White Boy Shuffle, read by Ray Shell — producer (BBC Radio 4, The Late Book, 10-part serial)
- 1997: Barbara Kimenye, The Winner, short story, read by Anthony Ofoegbu — producer (BBC Radio 4)
- 1998: Nicholas Monsarrat, Something To Hide, read in seven parts by Stephen Thorne — abridger and producer (BBC Radio 4, The Late Book)
- 1998: C. L. R. James, Minty Alley, dramatized by Margaret Busby — director (BBC Radio 4)
- 1999: Deborah Moggach, Playing the Part, read by Josie Lawrence — producer (BBC Radio 4)
- 1999: Antoine de Saint-Exupéry, The Little Prince, dramatized by Bonnie Greer, produced by Keith Waithe — director (BBC Radio 4)
- 2001: Stealing the Glory: the Conquest of the North Pole, presented by Colin Salmon, 30-minute feature on Arctic explorer Matthew Henson — writer and producer (BBC Radio 4)
- 2001: Michael McMillan, Hidden History: Blood for Britain, drama about Charles Drew — director (BBC Radio 4, Afternoon Play)
- 2001: Fay Weldon: Queen Gertrude PLC, starring Vanessa Redgrave — director (BBC Radio 4, The Saturday Play)
- 2001: Hidden History: Universal Tongue, presented by Rudolph Walker — producer (BBC Radio 4)
- 2002: Lisselle Kayla, Love in the Afternoon – Courtin' Miss Lucie, music by Keith Waithe — director (BBC Radio 4, Afternoon Play)
- 2003: Charles W. Chesnutt, Tradition, dramatized by Cheryl Martin — director (BBC Radio 4, Classic Serial)
- 2003: Margaret Busby, Yaa Asantewaa (about Yaa Asantewaa, queen mother of Ejisu), featuring Glenna Forster-Jones — director (BBC Radio 4, Woman's Hour, five-part serial)
- 2004: John Bunyan, The Pilgrim's Progress, adapted by Brian Sibley — director (BBC Radio 4, Classic Serial, three parts)
- 2005: Jane Austen, Northanger Abbey, dramatized by Dominic Power — director (BBC Radio 4, The Classic Serial, three parts)
- 2005: Margaret Busby, Nana, read by Glenna Forster-Jones — producer (BBC Radio 3, Africa Season, Twenty Minutes)
- 2007: Jackie Kay, The Lamplighter, narrated by Martina Laird, Aicha Kossoko, Clare Perkins and Mona Hammond — producer (BBC Radio 3, Drama on 3)
- 2007: Vivien Goldman, The Black Chord, presented by Neneh Cherry – producer (BBC Radio 2)
- 2011: Stories from Notting Hill, presented by Kwame Kwei-Armah — producer (BBC Radio 4)

=== Television ===
- 2006: One Night in White Satin — development producer (BBC TV)
- 2007: In Search of Wilberforce, presented by Moira Stuart, documentary examining the role of anti-slavery campaigner William Wilberforce — executive producer (BBC 2)
