= Harry Andrews =

English actor (1911–1989)

Harry Andrews CBE
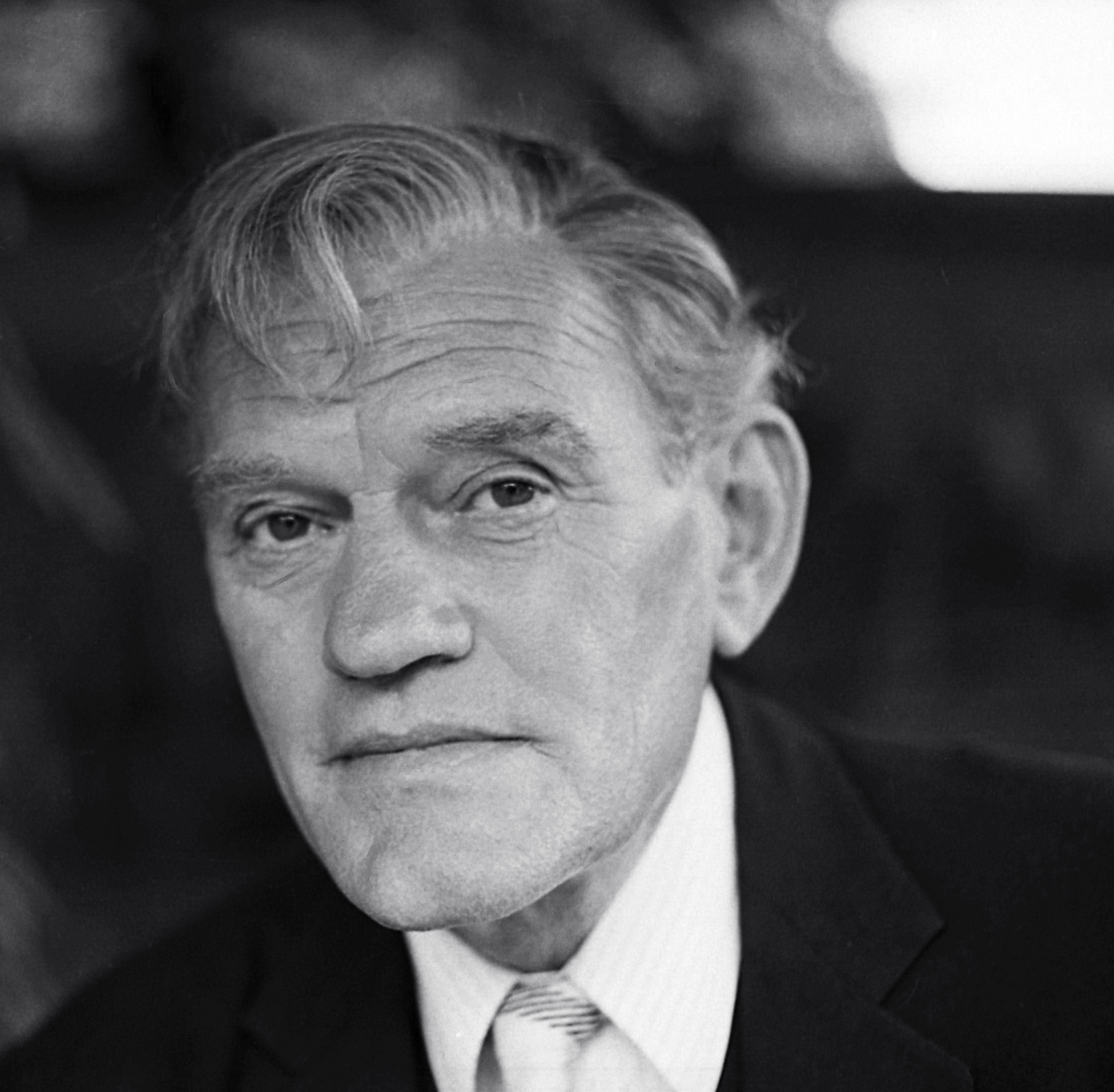
- Andrews in 1970
- Born: Henry Stewart Fleetwood Andrews; 10 November 1911; Tonbridge, Kent, England
- Died: 6 March 1989 (aged 77); Salehurst, Sussex, England
- Occupation: Actor
- Years active: 1933–1939, 1945–1989
- Partner: Basil Hoskins
- Awards: NBR Best Supporting Actor; 1966 The Agony and the Ecstasy; 1966 The Hill

Henry Stewart Fleetwood Andrews (10 November 1911 – 6 March 1989) was an English actor often known for his film portrayals of tough military officers. His performance as Regimental Sergeant Major Wilson in The Hill (1965) earned Andrews the National Board of Review Award for Best Supporting Actor and a nomination for the 1966 BAFTA Award for Best British Actor. The first of his more than 80 film appearances was in The Red Beret in 1953.

Prior to his film career, Andrews was a theatre actor, appearing at such venues as the Queen's Theatre, the Lyceum Theatre and the Shakespeare Memorial Theatre in the UK as well as theatres in New York City, Paris, Antwerp and Brussels. Andrews made his London theatre debut in 1935 at the St James's Theatre and his New York City debut in 1936 at the Empire Theatre.

Andrews was awarded the CBE in 1966.

== Early life ==
Harry Andrews was born on 10 November 1911 in Tonbridge, Kent. He was the son of Henry Arthur Andrews, a General Practitioner, and Amy Diana Frances (née Horner). Andrews attended Yardley Court school in Tonbridge and Wrekin College in Wellington, Shropshire.

== Military service ==
Like many men of his time, Andrews joined up in October 1939 and was commissioned into the Queen's Own Royal West Kent Regiment from 162 OCTU (The Honourable Artillery Company) on 21 September 1940 with the number 149267. In August 1942 he transferred to the Royal Artillery, serving in Europe during the D-Day Landings and on the advance into Germany. On 4 April 1946 Andrews was mentioned in dispatches "for gallant and distinguished service in North West Europe". He was demobilised with the rank of Major.

== Acting ==
=== Theatre ===
Andrews made his first stage appearance in September 1933 at the Liverpool Playhouse playing John in The Long Christmas Dinner. He made his London debut in March 1935 at the St James's Theatre playing the role of John in Worse Things Happen at Sea. In March 1936, he featured in a cast including Paul Robeson, Orlando Martins and Robert Adams in a staging of Toussaint Louverture: The Story of the Only Successful Slave Revolt in History, a play by C. L. R. James, at the Westminster Theatre in London. In October 1936, Andrews made his first appearance in New York City playing the role of Horatio in Hamlet at the Empire Theatre. From September 1937 to April 1938, Andrews worked with John Gielgud's company at the Queen's Theatre, appearing in such shows as Richard II, The School for Scandal and The Merchant of Venice. In 1939, Andrews assumed the role of Laertes in a production of Hamlet at the Lyceum Theatre. This was the final production at the Lyceum before it closed, though it was restored in 1996.

In December 1945, Andrews appeared with the Old Vic company at what was then referred to as the New Theatre, succeeding George Curzon in the parts of Sir Walter Blunt in Henry IV, Part 1, Scroop in Henry IV, Part 2, Creon in Oedipus and Sneer in The Critic. The company toured to New York City in the summer of 1946, appearing at such venues as the Century Theatre. Upon returning to Britain in September 1946, Andrews continued performing with the Old Vic company through the end of the 1948–1949 season.

In 1949, Andrews joined the company at the Shakespeare Memorial Theatre in Stratford-upon-Avon, in which he performed in such Shakespearean roles as Macduff, Don Pedro and Cardinal Wolsey. Andrews toured with the company through Australia in 1949. He continued to perform with the company in Stratford-upon-Avon through the 1951 season, playing Henry IV through three consecutive Shakespeare plays. He then travelled to New York with the company of Laurence Olivier, performing in such plays as Caesar and Cleopatra and Antony and Cleopatra at the Ziegfeld Theatre. Andrews went on tour with the Old Vic company performing Henry VIII in Paris, Antwerp and Brussels.

In 1971 Andrews played the title role in Lear by Edward Bond at the Royal Court Theatre, London, continuing his association with contemporary British theatre with his role in the film adaptation of Entertaining Mr Sloane by Joe Orton of the previous year in 1970 to great critical praise.

=== Film ===
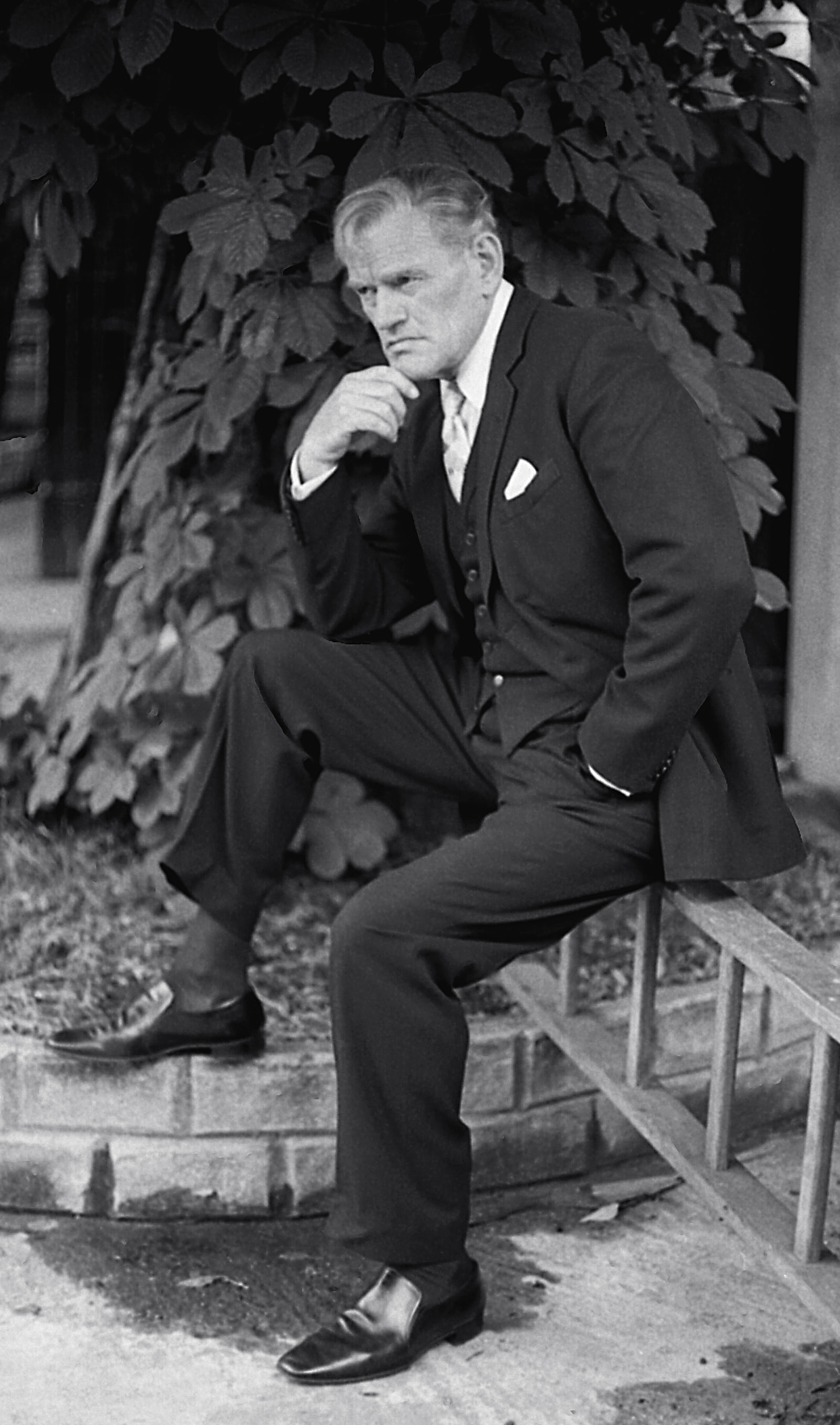
Harry Andrews, by Allan Warren

Andrews made his first two screen appearances with Alan Ladd in the films The Red Beret (1953) and The Black Knight (1954). He performed in several historical and adventure films, including Alexander the Great and Moby Dick (both 1956), Ice Cold in Alex (1958), Solomon and Sheba (1959) and 633 Squadron (1964). In the 1960s and 1970s, Andrews began performing more frequently in dramas and comedy films. He received the award for Best Supporting Actor from the National Board of Review of Motion Pictures for his performances in The Agony and the Ecstasy (1965) as Donato Bramante. The film starred Charlton Heston with whom Andrews shared several scenes in 55 Days at Peking (1963) and The Hill (1965) alongside Sean Connery. His performance in The Hill also resulted in Andrews being nominated for the 1966 BAFTA award for Best British Actor, though the award was won by Dirk Bogarde for his performance in Darling. Andrews later appeared in such films as the comedy The Jokers (1967), the musical comedy The Night They Raided Minsky's (1968), the 1970 film adaptation of Emily Brontë's novel Wuthering Heights, Entertaining Mr. Sloane, the 1970 film adaptation of the 1964 play by Joe Orton, the comedy The Ruling Class (1972), Man of La Mancha (1972) as the Innkeeper, the horror film Theatre of Blood (1973), and the 1976 film adaptation of Maurice Maeterlinck's play The Blue Bird, which was the first film collaboration between the United States and Soviet Russia. In 1978 he portrayed Norris the butler in Michael Winner's version of Raymond Chandler's The Big Sleep starring Robert Mitchum as Philip Marlowe.

Andrews was known for his portrayal of tough military officers. These performances included Sergeant Payne in A Hill in Korea (1956), Major Henry in I Accuse! (1958), Major Swindon in the 1959 film adaptation of George Bernard Shaw's play The Devil's Disciple, Captain Graham in A Touch of Larceny (also 1959), the 3rd Earl of Lucan in The Charge of the Light Brigade (1968) and Colonel Thompson in Too Late the Hero in 1970, and Grand Duke Nicholas, commander of the Russian army, in Nicholas and Alexandra in 1971.

In addition to film work, Andrews also appeared in several television series. In the early 1960s, Andrews appeared in two episodes of Armchair Theatre. He portrayed Colonel Bruce in Edward the Seventh (1975) and Darius Clayhanger in a 1976 television series based on The Clayhanger Family novels. He played one of the Kryptonian elders during the sentencing of the three villains in the film Superman (1978). He played the Prime Minister, Lord Bellinger, in the 1986 adaptation of Sherlock Holmes's The Second Stain. In 1985, Andrews was interviewed on an episode of This Is Your Life.

==== Filmography ====
- The Red Beret (1953) as R.S.M. Cameron
- The Black Knight (1954) as Earl Of Yeonil
- The Man Who Loved Redheads (1955) as Williams
- Helen of Troy (1956) as Hector
- Alexander the Great (1956) as Darius
- Moby Dick (1956) as Stubb
- A Hill in Korea (1956) as Sgt. Payne
- Saint Joan (1957) as John de Stogumber
- I Accuse! (1958) as Maj. Henry
- Ice Cold in Alex (1958) as M.S.M. Pugh
- The Devil's Disciple (1959) as Maj. Swindon
- Solomon and Sheba (1959) as Baltor
- A Touch of Larceny (1959) as Capt. Graham
- In the Nick (1960) as Chief Officer Williams
- Circle of Deception (1960) as Capt. Thomas Rawson
- The Best of Enemies (1961) as Capt. Rootes
- Barabbas (1961) as Peter
- Reach for Glory (1962) as Capt. Curlew
- The Inspector (1962) as Ayoob
- Nine Hours to Rama (1963) as General Singh
- 55 Days at Peking (1963) as Father de Bearn
- The Informers (1963) as Supt. Alec Bestwick
- Nothing But the Best (1964) as Mr. Horton
- 633 Squadron (1964) as Air Vice Marshal Davis
- The System (1964) as Larsey
- The Truth About Spring (1965) as Sellers
- The Hill (1965) as Regimental Sergeant Major Wilson
- The Agony and the Ecstasy (1965) as Donato Bramante
- Sands of the Kalahari (1965) as Grimmelman
- Modesty Blaise (1966) as Sir Gerald Tarrant
- The Deadly Affair (1967) as Inspector Mendel
- The Night of the Generals (1967) as General Stulpnagel (uncredited)
- The Jokers (1967) as Insp. Marryatt
- The Long Duel (1967) as Stafford
- Danger Route (1967) as Canning
- I'll Never Forget What's'isname (1967) as Gerald Sater
- A Dandy in Aspic (1968) as Fraser
- The Charge of the Light Brigade (1968) as Lord Lucan
- The Night They Raided Minsky's (1968) as Jacob Schpitendavel
- The Sea Gull (1968) as Sorin, her brother
- Play Dirty (1968) as Brig. Blore
- The Southern Star (1969) as Kramer
- Battle of Britain (1969) as Harold Balfour, Undersecretary of State for Air
- Destiny of a Spy (1969 TV movie) as General Kirk
- A Nice Girl Like Me (1969) as Savage, Caretaker
- Country Dance (1970) as Brig. Crieff
- Too Late the Hero (1970) as Col. Thompson
- Entertaining Mr Sloane (1970) as Ed
- Wuthering Heights (1970) as Mr. Earnshaw
- The Nightcomers (1971) as Master of the House
- Nicholas and Alexandra (1971) as Grand Duke Nicholas (Nikolasha)
- Burke & Hare (1971) as Dr. Knox
- I Want What I Want (1972) as Roy's Father
- The Ruling Class (1972) as Ralph Gurney – 13th Earl of Gurney
- Night Hair Child (1972) as Headmaster
- Man of La Mancha (1972) as The Innkeeper / The Governor
- Man at the Top (1973) as Lord Clive Ackerman
- Theatre of Blood (1973) as Trevor Dickman
- The Mackintosh Man (1973) as Mackintosh
- The Final Programme (1973) as John
- The Story of Jacob and Joseph (1974) as Isaac
- The Internecine Project (1974) as Albert Parsons
- Valley Forge (1975 TV movie) as General William Howe
- The New Spartans (1975)
- Sky Riders (1976) as Auerbach
- The Blue Bird (1976) as Oak
- The Passover Plot (1976) as Yohanan the Baptist
- The Garth People (1976)
- The Prince and the Pauper (1977) as Hertford
- Equus (1977) as Harry Dalton
- The Four Feathers (1978 TV movie) as General William Feversham
- The Big Sleep (1978) as Norris
- The Medusa Touch (1978) as Assistant Commissioner
- Death on the Nile (1978) as Barnstaple
- Watership Down (1978) as General Woundwort (voice)
- Superman (1978) as 2nd Elder
- S.O.S. Titanic (1979 TV movie) as Capt. Edward J. Smith
- A Question of Faith (1979) as Leo Tolstoy
- The Curse of King Tut's Tomb (1980 TV movie) as Lord George Carnarvon
- Closing Ranks (1980 TV movie) as Sir James Croft
- Hawk the Slayer (1980) as High Abbot
- Never Never Land (1980)
- Tales of the Unexpected (1980 TV episode "The Sound Machine") as Klausner
- Seven Dials Mystery (1981 TV movie) as Superintendent Battle
- My Letter to George (1985) as Old Thompson
- The Return of Sherlock Holmes (1986 TV series, episode "The Second Stain") as Lord Bellinger
- Jack the Ripper (1988 TV miniseries) as Coroner Wynne Baxter
- Cause célèbre (1989 TV movie) as Francis Rattenbury

== Personal life ==
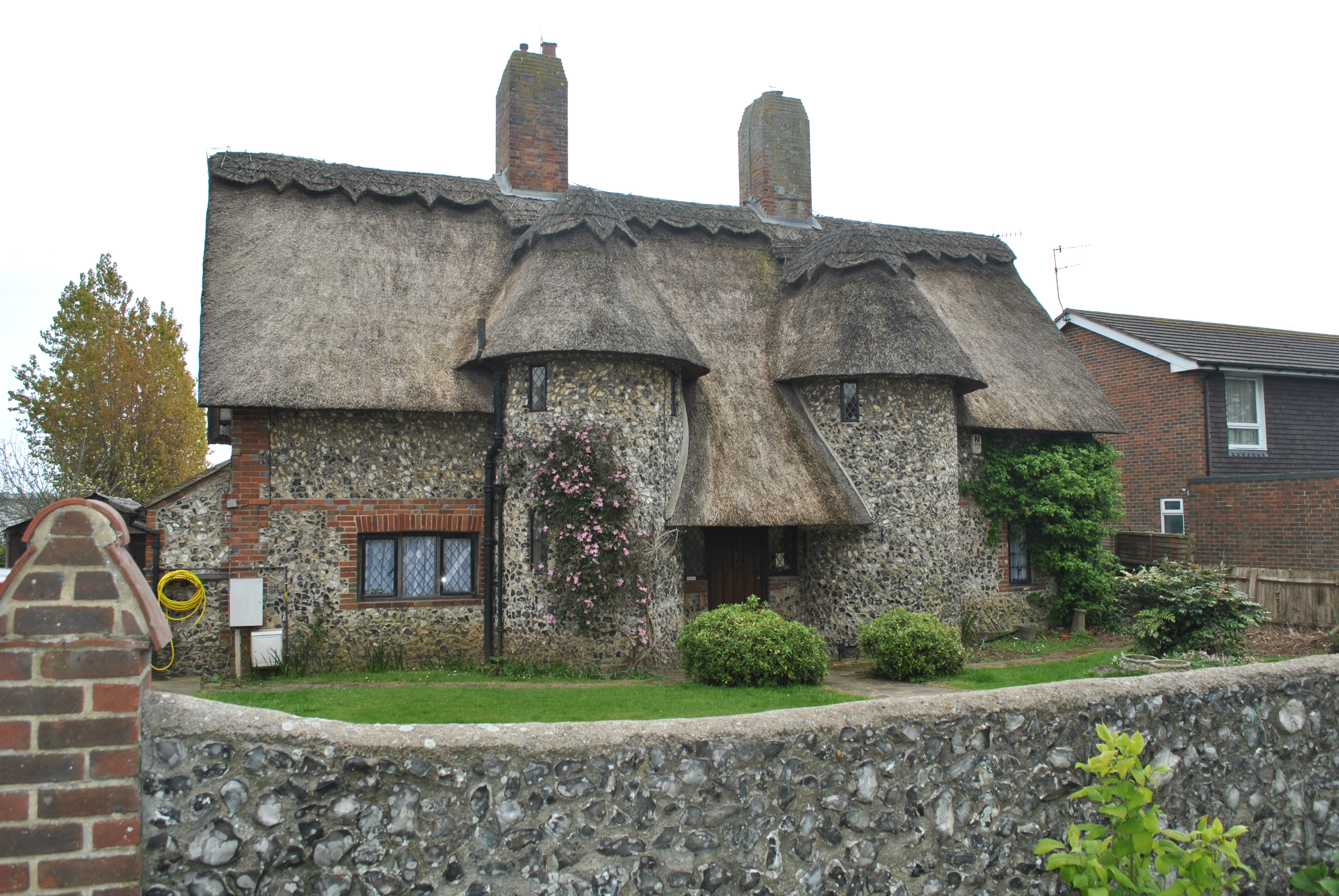
Little Thatch, Belgrave Road, Seaford, in 2017

Andrews's partner for more than 30 years was fellow actor Basil Hoskins, who survived him until 2005 and next to whom Andrews is buried at St Mary the Virgin, Salehurst, East Sussex. The two men had worked together on the film Ice Cold in Alex. Andrews died at the age of 77 on 6 March 1989, at his home in Salehurst.

Between 1956 and 1961, Andrews lived at Little Thatch, 50 Belgrave Road, Seaford, East Sussex.
