= Robert Adams (actor) =

Guyanese actor (1902–1965)

- Born: 1902; Georgetown, British Guiana
- Died: 1965 (aged 58–59); Georgetown, British Guiana
- Occupation: Actor
- Years active: 1935–60

Robert Adams (1902 – 1965) was a British Guyanese actor of stage and screen. He was the founder and director of the Negro Repertory Arts Theatre, one of the first professional black theatre companies in Britain, and became the world's first black television actor when he appeared in Theatre Parade: Scenes From Hassan on BBC TV in 1937. He was also the first Black actor to play a Shakespearian role on television (the Prince of Morocco in The Merchant of Venice), in 1947.

== Education and early career ==
(Wilfred) Robert Adams, the son of a boat builder, was born in Georgetown, British Guiana (now Guyana). In 1920, he won a scholarship to Jamaica's Mico Teachers' College, from which he graduated with honours. He worked as a teacher in British Guiana, while producing and acting in amateur stage productions. He went to England in the 1920s to study law and music, as well as to try to make it as a professional actor, and to fund his studies he worked as a labourer and as a wrestler, known as "The Black Eagle", eventually becoming heavyweight champion of the British Empire. In 1931, he was a founding member of Harold Moody's League of Coloured Peoples.

== Acting career ==
Adams began appearing as a film extra in 1934, and had roles in films including Midshipman Easy (1935), Song of Freedom (1936) and King Solomon's Mines (1937), the latter two alongside Paul Robeson. He also featured in Old Bones of the River (1938), worked as Robeson's stunt double in 1940's The Proud Valley, was in a 1941 Colonial Film Unit production entitled An African in London, and played the role of a Nubian slave in Caesar and Cleopatra (1945). The following year, when Adams starred in Men of Two Worlds, it was hailed by critics as a "ground-breaking film".

On the stage, Adams' first role was in 1935 at the Embassy Theatre in Stevedore, in which Robeson played the hero and which was enthusiastically reviewed by Nancy Cunard in The Crisis: "This production of Stevedore has brought to light a fine new personality, on the stage for the first time: Robert Adams, Negro of British Guiana, well known otherwise as 'Black Eagle,' wrestler. He plays 'Blacksnake.' An extraordinarily fine, a natural-born actor, who should without fail find other good parts and work on the screen as well, for even a merely intelligent producer – but I wish him the best, Sergei Eisenstein."

Another early role was as Jean-Jacques Dessalines in the 1936 play Toussaint Louverture: The Story of the Only Successful Slave Revolt in History by C. L. R. James, again alongside Robeson and also other notable actors including Orlando Martins and Harry Andrews. Adams went on to take the lead in a television adaptation of Eugene O'Neill's The Emperor Jones. The role of Brutus Jones, a Pullman porter who becomes the ruler of a Caribbean island, had already been played by Robeson on stage and screen. The BBC's version was transmitted live from Alexandra Palace on 11 May 1938, and Adams became the first black actor to play a leading dramatic role on television; another BBC appearance that year was in W. B. Yeats' 1907 play Deirdre. Adams also appeared in Geoffrey Trease's Colony (1939), which was about the exploitation of sugar workers in a Caribbean island.

Historic BBC publicity shot of Robert Adams as the Emperor Jones, 1938

After Robeson returned to the United States at the outbreak of the Second World War, Adams became Britain's leading black actor, and would continue acting on television in the 1940s and 1950s.

In 1944, Adams founded the Negro Arts Movement. In the late 1940s, Adams founded the Negro Repertory Arts Theatre, whose productions included O'Neill's All God's Chillun Got Wings, at Colchester in 1944. He also appeared in the Unity Theatre's 1946 production of the play and a BBC television production in 1946. In 1948 he played Bigger Thomas in the play based on Richard Wright's novel Native Son, staged at the Bolton's Theatre Club.

Adams subsequently studied law and took a break from acting, returning to London's West End stage in 1958 in Eugene O'Neill's The Iceman Cometh, and appearing on television in Green Pastures (1958) and Errol John's Moon on a Rainbow Shawl in a 1960 ITV production. He eventually returned to British Guiana, where he died in 1965.

== Filmography ==
Year	Title	Role	Notes
1935	Sanders of the River	Minor Role	Uncredited
1935	Midshipman Easy	Mesty	
1936	Song of Freedom	Monty	
1937	King Solomon's Mines	Twala	
1938	Old Bones of the River	Bosambo	
1944	It Happened One Sunday	Gorilla Jim	Uncredited
1944	Dreaming	Nubian Slave	
1945	Caesar and Cleopatra	Nubian Slave	
1946	Men of Two Worlds	Kisenga	
1951	Old Mother Riley's Jungle Treasure	Chief "Stinker"	
1951	Follow the Sun	Golf Pro	Uncredited
1959	Sapphire	Horace Big Cigar	
1960	The Criminal	Judas	(final film role)
