= Ralph Dumain =

American librarian

Ralph Dumain is an American archivist, librarian and independent researcher.

In 1991 Dumain became archivist/librarian of the C.L.R. James Institute in New York City, founded by Jim Murray (1949–2003) in 1983 to document James's life and work. The Institute is affiliated to the Centre of African Studies at the University of Cambridge, but has tried to make James's work available to a wider public by remaining "outside and independent of academia" and other "traditional institutional forms (including leftist political parties)". This ideal is also reflected in Dumain's unusual website, The Autodidact Project, which reprints bibliographies, research guides and articles by radical thinkers, as well as a wide range of reviews and other writings by Dumain himself.

Dumain has also served as president of the World Atheist Esperanto Organisation (Ateista Tutmonda Esperanto-Organizo, ATEO).
