= Alfred Auguste Nemours =

Haitian military general, diplomat and historian

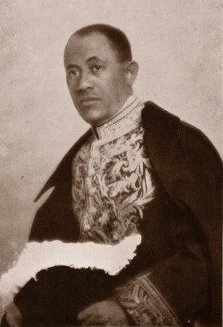

Haitian ambassador to France
- In office 1926–1930
- Preceded by: Dantès Bellegarde
- Succeeded by: Constantin Mayard (1882–1940)

Personal details
- Born: 13 July 1883 Cap-Haïtien
- Died: 17 October 1955 (aged 72) Rome
- Children: Charles Maurice Nemours, Lilas Nemours Auguste
- Parents: Nemours Auguste (father); Améthyste Albaret (mother)

Alfred Auguste Nemours (13 July 1883 – 17 October 1955) was a Haitian military general, diplomat and military historian.

== Biography ==
He was born into a wealthy family in Cap-Haïtien, northern Haiti. His father was Nemours Auguste and his mother Amétise Albaret. He adopted Nemours as his principal name later in life. Alfred was sent to the Lycée in Paris, followed by the military academy Saint-Cyr.

During the United States occupation of Haiti, Auguste Nemours wrote his Histoire Militaire. He also was part of the unpopular occupation government of Louis Borno, serving as Conseiller d'Etat from 1918 to 1922, Secretary and President du Conseil d'Etat from 1922 to 1925, and Minister Plenipotentiary to Paris from 1926 to 1930. From 1928 to 1929 he was concurrently accredited to the Holy See.

He was the Haitian delegate to the 7th (1926), 9th (1928) and 16th (1935) Ordinary Session of the Assembly of the League of Nations, held in Geneva, Switzerland. Speaking at the League, Nemours made a widely-reproduced statement in response to the invasion of Ethiopia by Mussolini's fascist troops:

Craignez d'être un jour l'Ethiopie de quelqu'un.

Fear to ever become someone's Ethiopia.

He continued to play a prominent role in Haitian politics, as Senator of the Republic in 1938 and Secretary of State of Interior in 1940. C. L. R. James met Nemours in Paris when he was writing The Black Jacobins (1938). In 1941 he was elected President of the Senate.

== Publications ==
- 1909: Sur le choix d'une discipline: l'anglo-saxonne ou la française
- 1925: Histoire militaire de la guerre d'independance de Saint-Domingue
- 1926: Les Borno dans l'histoire d'Haiti
- 1927: Princesses créoles (with Claude Farrère)
- 1941: Les Premiers citoyens et les premiers députés noirs et de couleur: la loi du 4 avril 1792, ses précédents, sa première application à Saint-Domingue, d'après des documents inédits de l'époque, suivi de : Le Cap Français en 1792, à l'arrivée de Sonthonax, d'après des documents inédits de l'époque
- 1945: La Charte des Nations Unies: étude comparative de la Charte avec les propositions de Dumbarton Oaks, le covenant de la Société des Nations, les conventions de la Haye, les propositions et doctrines inter américaines
- 1952: Haïti et la Guerre de l'Indépendance Américaine (reprinted 2013)
