= Toussaint Louverture: The Story of the Only Successful Slave Revolt in History =

1934 play by C L R James

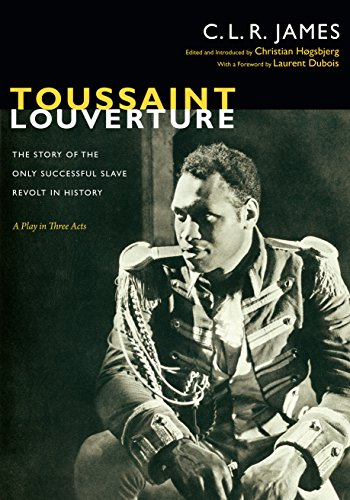
- Author: C. L. R. James
- Language: English
- Subject: Haitian Revolution
- Genre: History (theatrical genre)
- Publication date: 15 February 2013 (script)
- Publication place: United Kingdom
- Media type: Print
- ISBN: 978-1788737906

Toussaint Louverture: The Story of the Only Successful Slave Revolt in History is a three-act play about Toussaint L'Ouverture, the leader of the Haitian Revolution (21 August 1791 – 1 January 1804), written by C. L. R. James in 1934.

== History ==
In March 1936, the play was staged for two performances in the Westminster Theatre in London's West End by the Stage Society, a private club, to avoid Theatres Act censorship laws. It was directed by Peter Godfrey and starred Paul Robeson in the title role, as well as Orlando Martins as Dutty Boukman, Robert Adams as Jean-Jacques Dessalines and Harry Andrews. It was the first time black professional actors featured in a production written by a black playwright in the UK.

The play had been presumed lost until its rediscovery as a draft copy in 2005 by historian Christian Høgsbjerg. The play was published for the first time in 2013 by Duke University Press, with a foreword by Laurent Dubois and an introduction by Høgsbjerg. Toussaint Louverture is perhaps the last major piece of James's work to be published.

C. L. R. James went on to write the classic history of the Haitian Revolution, the book The Black Jacobins, in 1938.

In 1967, James completely revised his play with the help of Dexter Lyndersay, and his new play, The Black Jacobins, has been performed internationally subsequently, including a radio adaptation broadcast on BBC Radio 4 on 13 December 1971, with Earl Cameron as Toussaint.

This revised play became the first production of Talawa Theatre Company in 1986, directed by Yvonne Brewster at the Riverside Studios in London, with Norman Beaton in the title role, coinciding with the overthrow of Baby Doc Duvalier as president of Haiti. In 2019, the book Making the Black Jacobins, written by Rachel Douglas, examined James's lifetime writing and rewriting of the Haitian Revolution as history and drama.

== Adaptations ==
The play has been adapted into a graphic novel, by artists Nic Watts and Sakina Karimjee, which was published by Verso Books in October 2023. Both Forbes magazine and The Comics Journal included it among their top graphic novels of 2023.

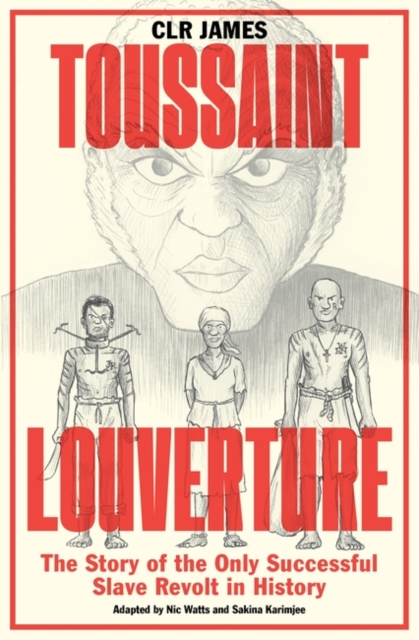
Front cover of the graphic novel adaption

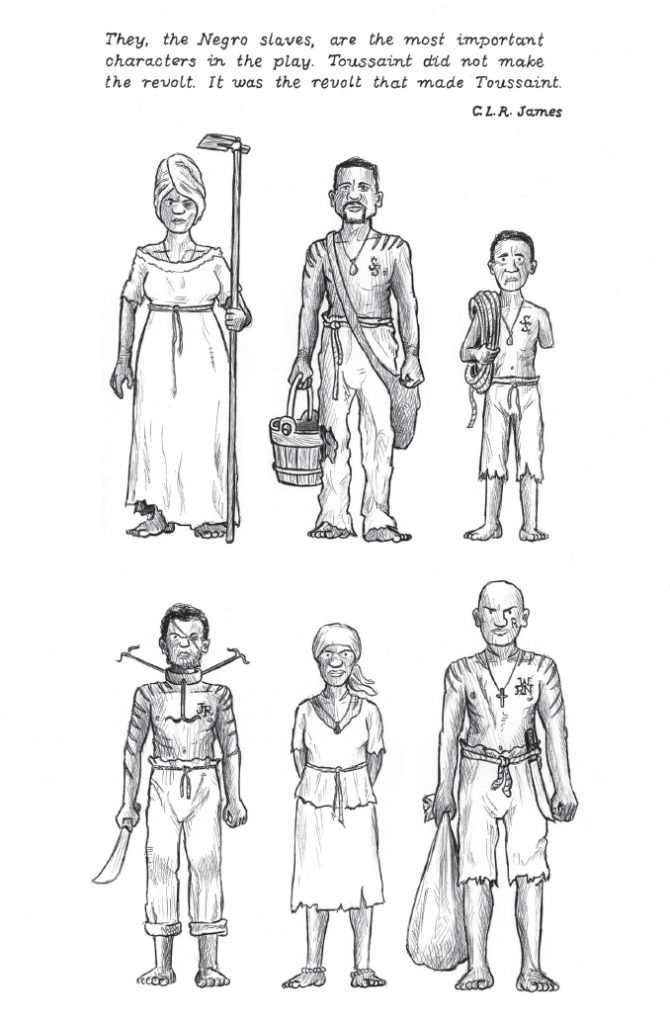
Front endpapers

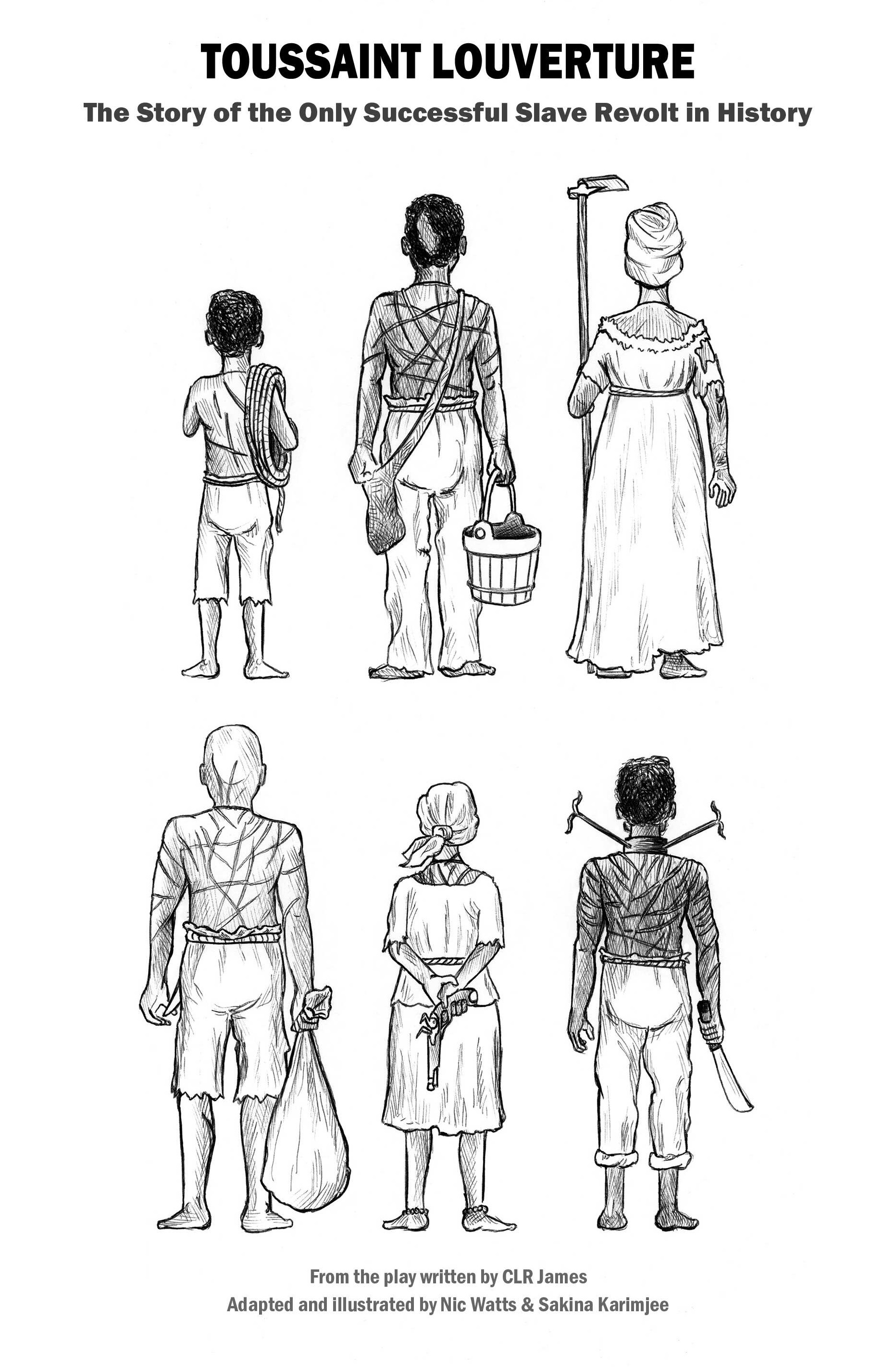
Front endpapers

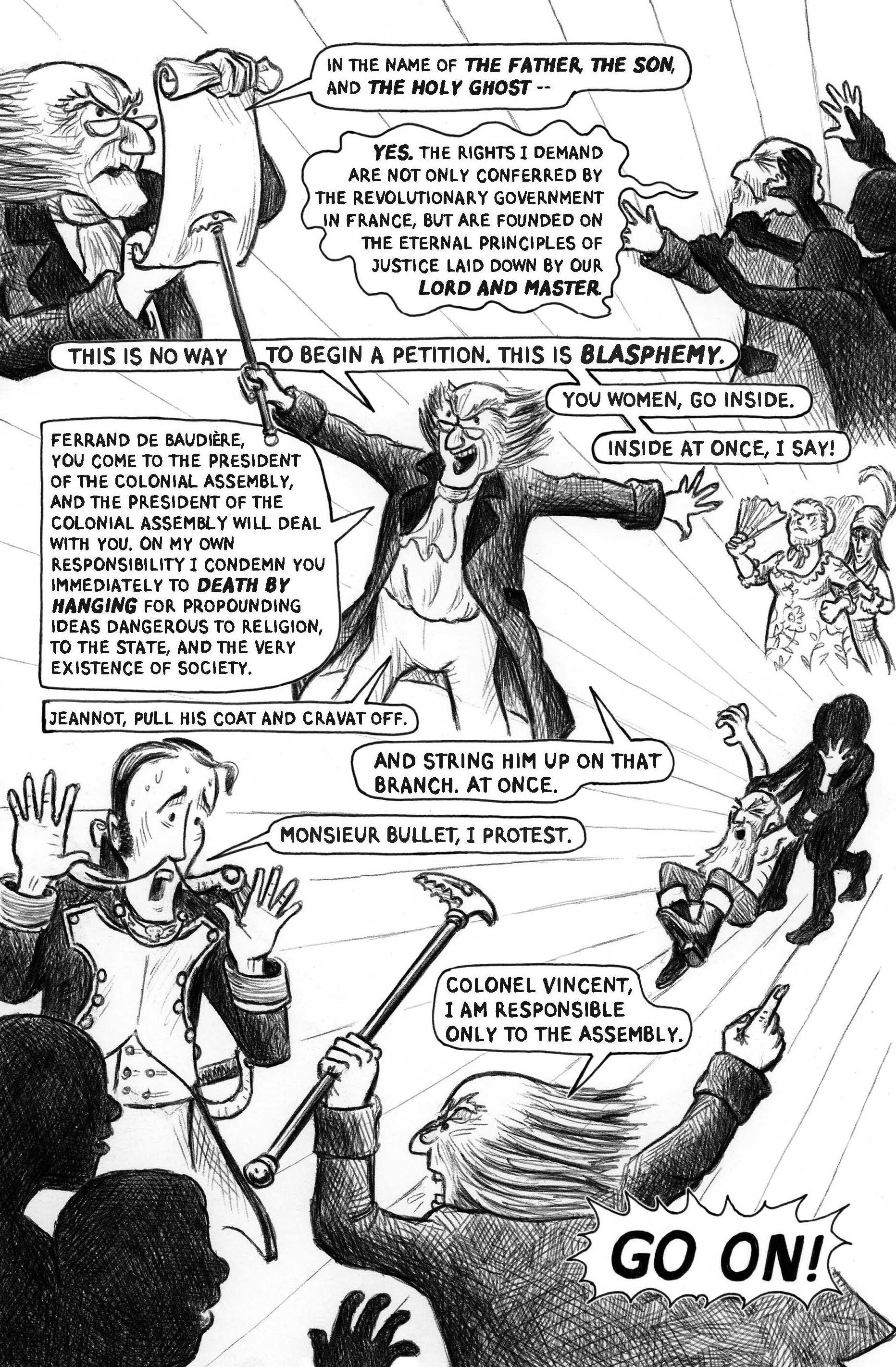
Inside page

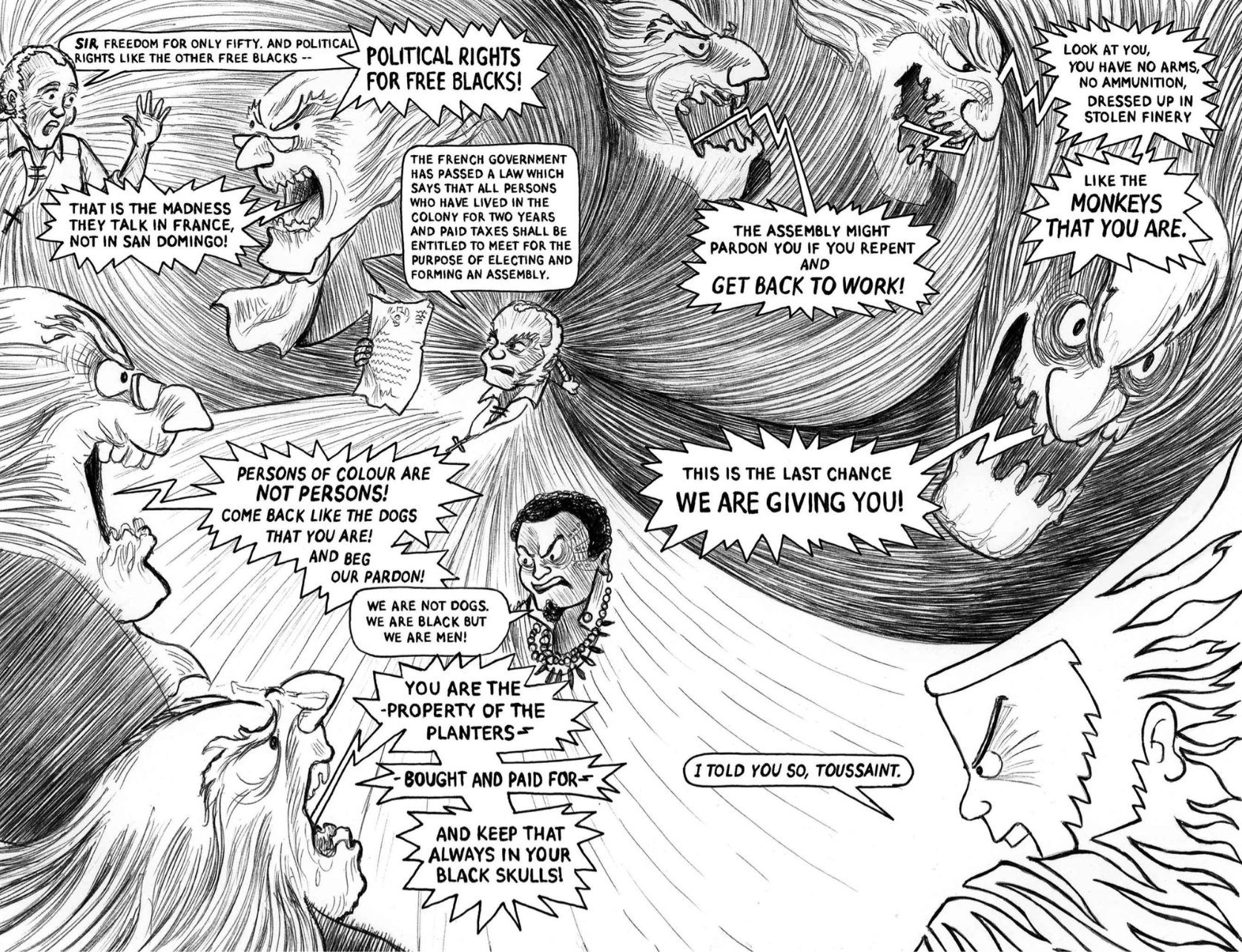
Inside spread

== Further reading / External links ==
- C. L. R. James, Toussaint Louverture: The story of the only successful slave revolt in history, Duke University Press, 2012, 240 pp. ISBN 978-0-8223-5303-4.
- Rachel Douglas, Making the Black Jacobins: C.L.R. James and the Drama of History, Duke University Press, 2019, 320 pp. ISBN 978-1-4780-0427-1.
- "Toussaint Louverture: The Story of the Only Successful Slave Revolt in History; A Play in Three Acts". Special issue of sx salon 16 (2014), with contributions on the play by Raphael Dalleo, Laura Harris, Jeremy Matthew Glick and Christian Høgsbjerg.
