= Harvill Secker =

British publishing company

- Parent company: Penguin Random House
- Founded: 2005; 21 years ago
- Country of origin: United Kingdom
- Headquarters location: London
- Publication types: Book
- Official website: www.penguin.co.uk/about/publishing-houses/vintage/harvill

Harvill Secker is a British publishing company formed in 2005 from the merger of Secker & Warburg and the Harvill Press.

== History ==
=== Secker & Warburg ===
Secker & Warburg was formed in 1935 from a takeover of Martin Secker, which was in receivership, by Fredric Warburg and Roger Senhouse. The firm became renowned for its political stance, being both anti-fascist and anti-communist, a position that put them at loggerheads with the ethos of many intellectuals of the time.

When George Orwell parted company with Communist Party sympathizer Victor Gollancz over his editing of The Road to Wigan Pier (1937), he took his next book Homage to Catalonia to Secker & Warburg, who published it in 1938. They also published, after 18 months of rejections and setbacks, Animal Farm (1945), and Orwell's subsequent books. Orwell and Warburg later became intimate friends.

Secker & Warburg published other books by key figures of the anti-Stalinist left, such as Minty Alley, World Revolution, and The Black Jacobins by C. L. R. James, Rudolf Rocker and Boris Souvarine, Red Spanish Notebook: the first six months of revolution and the civil war by Juan Ramón Breá and Mary Stanley Low and works by Lewis Mumford.

In February 1941, the company launched a series of "long pamphlets" or "short books" called Searchlight Books, edited by George Orwell and T. R. Fyvel. The series was originally planned to include 17 books, but was discontinued after the publication of 10 when bombing destroyed paper stocks.

With its financial position devastated by paper shortages during and after the war, Secker & Warburg were forced to join the Heinemann group of publishers in 1951. During the 1950s and 1960s, Secker & Warburg published the works of, among others, Simone de Beauvoir, Colette, J. M. Coetzee, Alberto Moravia, Günter Grass, Angus Wilson, Michael Moorcock, Melvyn Bragg and Julian Gloag, as well as the British Buddhist Lobsang Rampa.

Heinemann was purchased by the Octopus Publishing Group in 1985; Octopus was purchased by Reed International (now Reed Elsevier) in 1987. Random House bought the adult trade division of Reed Books in February 1997.

Tom Rosenthal (1935–2014), chairman of the Institute of Contemporary Arts, was head of Secker & Warburg from 1971 to 1984.

=== Harvill Press ===
The Harvill Press was founded in 1946 by Manya Harari and Marjorie Villiers. The imprint was later acquired by the Glasgow-based publishing firm William Collins and Sons, which in 1989, merged with the American publishers Harper & Row to form HarperCollins. Under the leadership of Christopher MacLehose, between 1998 and 2005, Harvill Press published a numbered series of books, known as the Leopard Series due to the series emblem (the initial series ran up to number 310 and was revived in 2020).

In 1996, Harvill Press became independent following a management buyout. The firm was bought by Random House in 2002, and was merged with Secker & Warburg in 2005 to become Harvill Secker.

As of 2019, Harvill Secker is an imprint of Vintage Publishing UK.
