= Dalston Square =

Coordinates: 51°32′44.28″N 0°4′27.71″W

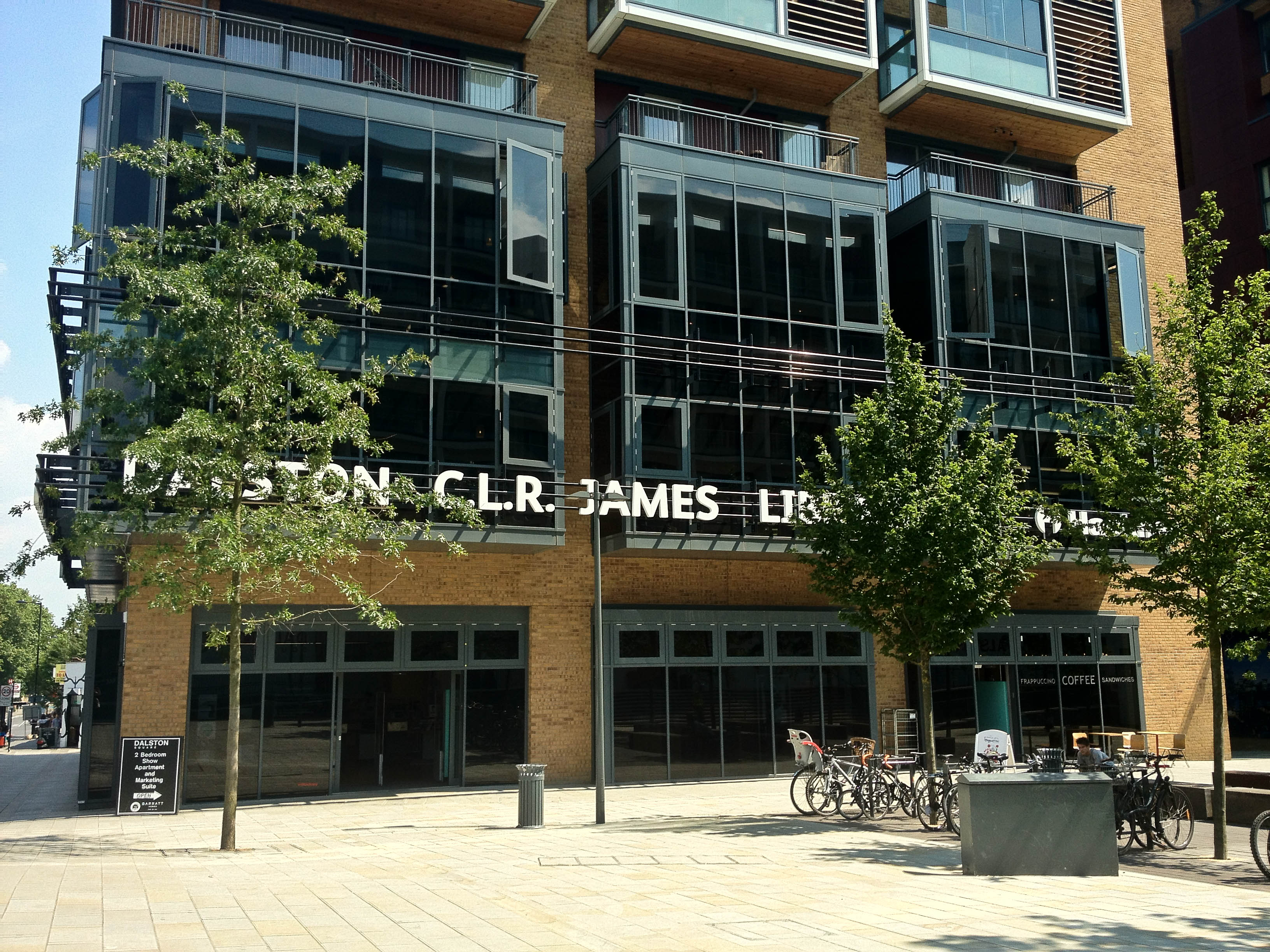
The C. L. R. James Library in Dalston Square

Dalston Square is a largely residential complex located just off Kingsland Road near Dalston Junction station in Dalston, part of the London Borough of Hackney. It includes approximately 500 homes, a library, public space, shops and restaurants.

== Overview ==
Dalston Square was originally the site of a former hippodrome and music hall, which opened in 1886 under the name "Dalston Circus". After a series of name changes, the curtain went down on live theatre in 1920 when the venue was changed into a cinema. It operated successfully under a variety of names, the last of which - the Gaumont Theatre - is now remembered in the name of one of the residential towers, until 1960. After a brief stint as a warehouse and car sale room, the building once again opened its doors to entertainment audiences when, in 1966 it was reopened as the Four Aces Club a music and recreational space dedicated to celebrating Afro Caribbean music. It was famous for its Reggae, Roots, Soul and R&B and hosted acts The Ronettes, Desmond Dekker and Ben E. King. In the 1980s, it changed hands again and became the Labyrinth nightclub It closed its doors for good in 1998 and, despite objections from the local community and a number of conservation organisations, was demolished in 2007.

The London Development Agency and the landowners – Hackney Council and Transport for London – developed the two sites at Dalston Lane South and Dalston Junction in conjunction with Barratt Homes.

Located in Dalston Square is the Dalston C. L. R. James Library, which was the first library to open in Hackney for 20 years.

In 2016, Telford Homes redeveloped the Holy Trinity School located at the southeastern edge of Dalston Square into a mixed building called "The Vibe" which incorporates a bigger school as well as 101 flats.
