= C. L. R. James =

Trinidadian historian, journalist and Marxist (1901–1989)

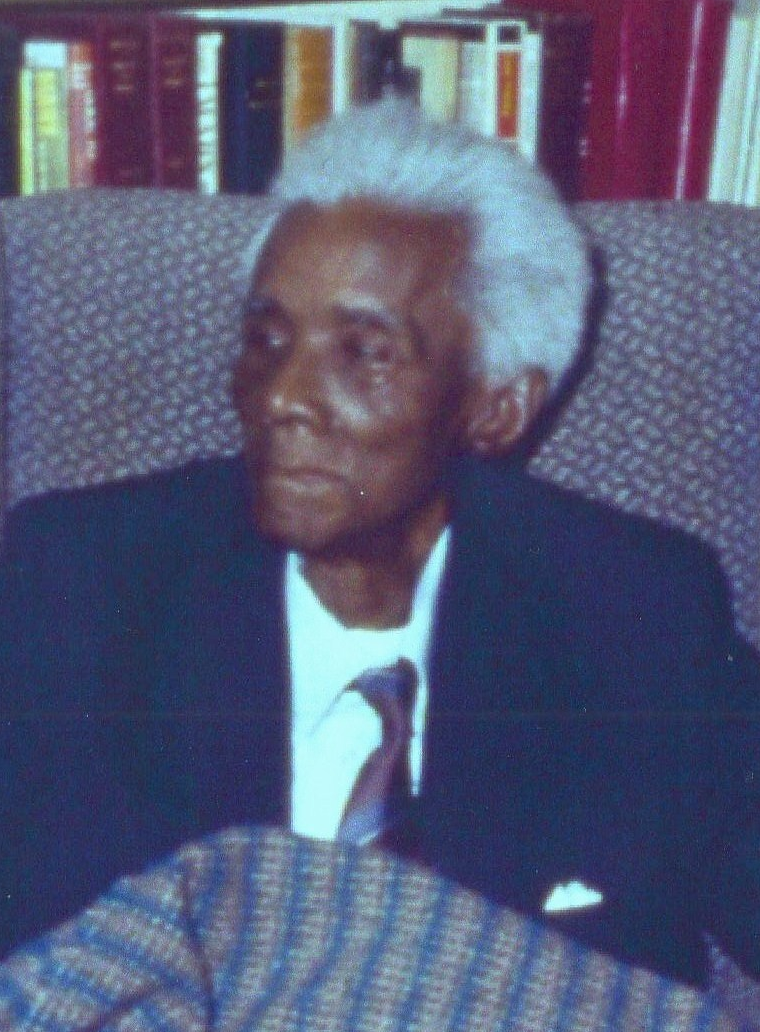
- James in 1988
- Born: Cyril Lionel Robert James; 4 January 1901; Tunapuna, Trinidad and Tobago
- Died: 31 May 1989 (aged 88); Brixton, London, England
- Other names: J. R. Johnson; Nello James
- Education: Queen's Royal College
- Occupations: Historian, writer
- Notable work: The Black Jacobins; Beyond a Boundary; Minty Alley; Toussaint Louverture: The Story of the Only Successful Slave Revolt in History; World Revolution
- Movement: Johnson–Forest Tendency
- Spouses: Juanita Young (m. 1929; div. 1932) Constance Webb (m. 1946; div. 1953) Selma Weinstein (m. 1956; div. 1980)
- Children: 1
- Relatives: Darcus Howe (nephew)

Cyril Lionel Robert James (4 January 1901 – 31 May 1989), who sometimes wrote under the pen-name J. R. Johnson, was a Trinidadian historian, journalist, activist, and Marxist writer. His works are influential in various theoretical, social, and historiographical contexts. His work is a staple of Marxism, and he figures as a pioneering and influential voice in postcolonial literature. A tireless political activist, James is the author of the 1937 work World Revolution outlining the history of the Communist International, which stirred debate in Trotskyist circles, and in 1938 he wrote on the Haitian Revolution, The Black Jacobins.

Characterised by Edward Said as an "anti-Stalinist dialectician", James was known for his autodidactism, occasional playwriting and fiction writing, and as an avid sportsman. The 1936 performance of his play Toussaint Louverture was the first time black professional actors were featured in a production written by a black playwright in the UK. James's 1936 book Minty Alley was the first novel by a black West Indian to be published in Britain. He is also famed as a writer on cricket and in 1963 he published his book Beyond a Boundary, which he himself described as "neither cricket reminiscences nor autobiography".

== Biography ==
=== Early life in Trinidad ===
Born in 1901 in Tunapuna, Trinidad and Tobago, which was a British Crown colony then, C. L. R. James was the first child of schoolteacher Robert Alexander James and Ida Elizabeth, née Rudder.

In 1910, James won a scholarship to Queen's Royal College (QRC), the island's oldest non-Catholic secondary school, in Port of Spain, where he became a club cricketer, distinguished himself as an athlete (he held the Trinidad high-jump record at 5 feet 9 inches (175 cm) from 1918 to 1922), and began to write fiction. After graduating in 1918 from QRC, he worked there as a teacher of English and History in the 1920s; among those he taught was the young Eric Williams, who became the first Prime Minister of Trinidad and Tobago.

Together with Ralph de Boissière, Albert Gomes, and Alfred Mendes, James was a member of the anticolonialist Beacon Group, a circle of writers associated with The Beacon magazine, in which he published a series of short stories. His short story "La Divina Pastora" was published in October 1927 in the Saturday Review of Literature and was widely reprinted.

=== British years ===
In 1932, James left Trinidad for the small town of Nelson in Lancashire, England, at the invitation of his friend, West Indian cricketer Learie Constantine, who needed his help writing his autobiography Cricket and I (published in London in 1933, with a preface by critic Neville Cardus). James had brought with him to England the manuscript of his first full-length non-fiction work, partly based on his interviews with the Trinidad labour leader Arthur Andrew Cipriani, which was published with financial assistance from Constantine in 1932.

During this time, James took a job as cricket correspondent with The Manchester Guardian, recruited by Neville Cardus, alongside whom he worked. In 1933, he moved to London. The following year, he joined a Trotskyist group that met to talk for hours in his rented room. Louise Cripps, one of its members, recalled: "We felt our work could contribute to the time when we would see Socialism spreading."

James had begun to campaign for the independence of the West Indies while in Trinidad. An abridged version of his Life of Captain Cipriani was issued by Leonard and Virginia Woolf's Hogarth Press in 1933 as the pamphlet The Case for West-Indian Self Government. James became a champion of Pan-Africanism and served as Chair of the International African Friends of Abyssinia, later renamed the International African Friends of Ethiopia (IAFE) — a group formed in 1935 in response to the Italian fascist invasion of Ethiopia (the Second Italo-Ethiopian War). Leading members included Amy Ashwood Garvey, Jomo Kenyatta, and Chris Braithwaite.

When the IAFE was transformed into the International African Service Bureau in 1937, James edited its newsletter, Africa and the World, and its journal, International African Opinion. The Bureau was led by his childhood friend George Padmore, who became a driving force for socialist Pan-Africanism for several decades. Both Padmore and James wrote for the New Leader, published by the Independent Labour Party (ILP), which James had joined in 1934 (when Fenner Brockway was its General Secretary).

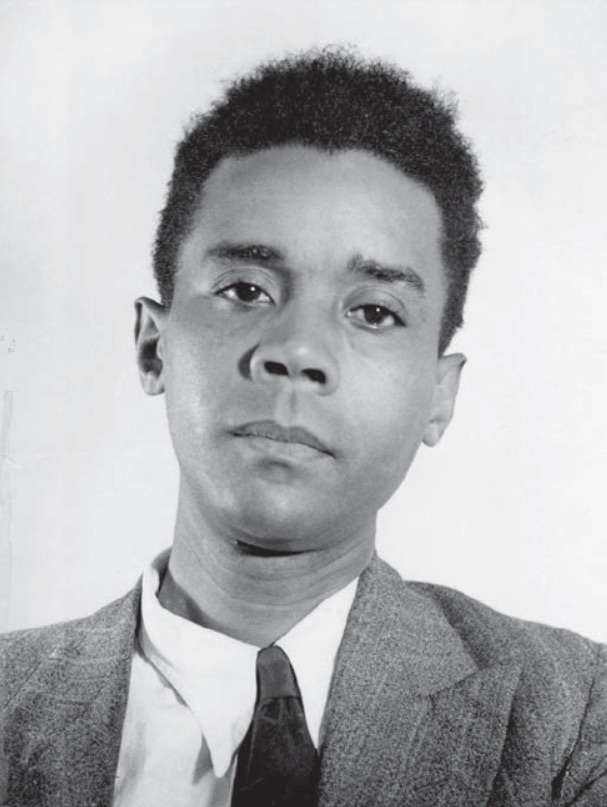
James in 1938

In 1934, James wrote a three-act play about the Haitian revolutionary Toussaint Louverture (entitled Toussaint Louverture: The Story of the Only Successful Slave Revolt in History), which was staged in London's West End in 1936 and starred Paul Robeson, Orlando Martins, Robert Adams, and Harry Andrews. The play had been presumed lost until the rediscovery of a draft copy in 2005. The play was adapted into a 2023 graphic novel by Nic Watts and Sakina Karimjee (published by Verso Books). (James went on to write in 1967 a second play about the Haitian Revolution, The Black Jacobins, which would become the first production from Talawa Theatre Company in 1986, coinciding with the overthrow of Jean-Claude Duvalier, who had held the presidency of Haiti since 1971.)

Also in 1936, Secker & Warburg in London published James's novel, Minty Alley, which he had brought with him in manuscript form from Trinidad. (Fenner Brockway had introduced him to Fredric Warburg, co-owner of the press.) It was the first novel to be published by a black Caribbean author in the UK. In 1937, James wrote the foreword to Red Spanish Notebook: the first six months of revolution and the civil war, by Juan Ramón Breá and Mary Stanley Low.

Amid his frenetic political activity, James wrote what are perhaps his best known works of non-fiction: World Revolution (1937), a history of the rise and fall of the Communist International, which was critically praised by Leon Trotsky, George Orwell, E. H. Carr, and Fenner Brockway; and The Black Jacobins: Toussaint L'Ouverture and the San Domingo Revolution (1938), a widely acclaimed history of the Haitian Revolution, which was later seen as a seminal text in the study of the African diaspora. James went to Paris to research this work, where he met Haitian military historian Alfred Auguste Nemours. In a new foreword to the 1980 Allison & Busby edition of The Black Jacobins, James recalled that "Nemours used coffee cups and books in Paris cafés to bring to life the military skills of revolutionary Haitians."

In 1936, James and his Trotskyist Marxist Group left the ILP to form an open party. In 1938, this new group took part in several mergers to form the Revolutionary Socialist League (RSL). The RSL was a highly factionalised organisation.

=== Speaking tour in the United States ===
At the urging of Trotsky and James P. Cannon, in October 1938, James was invited to tour the United States by the leadership of the Socialist Workers' Party (SWP), then the US section of the Fourth International, to facilitate its work among black workers. Following several meetings in New York, where he garnered "enthusiastic praise for his oratorical ability and capacity for analysis of world events", James kicked off his national speaking tour on 6 January 1939 in Philadelphia. He gave lectures in cities including New Haven, Youngstown, Rochester, and Boston, before finishing the tour with two lectures in Los Angeles and another in Pasadena in March 1939. He spoke on topics such as "Twilight of the British Empire" and "The Negro and World Imperialism".

Constance Webb, who later became James's second wife, attended one of his 1939 lectures in Los Angeles and reflected on it in her memoir, writing: "I had already heard speeches by two great orators, Winston Churchill and Franklin Delano Roosevelt. Now I was hearing a third. The three men were masters of the English language, a skill that gave them extraordinary power."

James's relationship with Louise Cripps Samoiloff had broken up after her second abortion, so that intimate tie no longer bound him to England.

== Meeting Trotsky ==
In April 1939, James visited Trotsky in Coyoacán, Mexico. James stayed there for about a month and also met Diego Rivera and Frida Kahlo, before returning to the United States in May 1939. A key topic that James and Trotsky discussed was the "Negro Question". Parts of their conversation were transcribed, with James sometimes referred to by his pen-name, J. R. Johnson. Whereas Trotsky saw the Trotskyist Party as providing leadership to the black community, in the general manner that the Bolsheviks provided guidance to ethnic minorities in Russia, James suggested that the self-organised struggle of African Americans would precipitate a much broader radical social movement.

=== U.S. and the Johnson–Forest Tendency ===
James stayed in the United States until he was deported in 1953. By 1940, he had begun to doubt Trotsky's view of the Soviet Union as a degenerated workers' state. He left the SWP along with Max Shachtman, who formed the Workers' Party (WP). Within the WP, James formed the Johnson–Forest Tendency with Raya Dunayevskaya (his pseudonym was Johnson and Dunayevskaya's was Forest) and Grace Lee (later Grace Lee Boggs) to spread their views within the new party.

As "J. R. Johnson", James wrote the column "The Negro Question" for Socialist Appeal (later renamed The Militant), and was also a columnist for the WP newspaper Labor Action.

While within the WP, the views of the Johnson–Forest Tendency underwent considerable development. By the end of the Second World War, they had definitively rejected Trotsky's theory of Russia as a degenerated workers' state. Instead, they classified it as state capitalist, a political evolution shared by other Trotskyists of their generation, most notably Tony Cliff. Unlike Cliff, the Johnson–Forest Tendency was focusing increasingly on the liberation movements of oppressed minorities, a theoretical development already visible in James's thought in his 1939 discussions with Trotsky. Such liberation struggles came to take centre stage for the Johnson–Forest Tendency.

After the Second World War, the WP witnessed a downturn in revolutionary sentiment. The Tendency, on the other hand, was encouraged by the prospects for revolutionary change for oppressed peoples. After a few short months as an independent group, during which they published a great deal of material, in 1947, the Johnson–Forest Tendency joined the SWP, which it regarded as more proletarian than the WP.

James still described himself as a Leninist despite his rejection of Vladimir Lenin's conception of the vanguard role of the revolutionary party. He argued for socialists to support the emerging black nationalist movements. By 1949, James rejected the idea of a vanguard party. This led the Johnson–Forest Tendency to leave the Trotskyist movement and rename itself the Correspondence Publishing Committee.

In 1955, after James had left for Britain, about half the membership of the Committee withdrew, under the leadership of Raya Dunayevskaya, to form a separate tendency of Marxist humanism and found the organisation News and Letters Committees. Whether Dunayevskaya's faction had constituted a majority or a minority in the Correspondence Publishing Committee remains a matter of dispute. Historian Kent Worcester says that Dunayevskaya's supporters formed a majority, but Martin Glaberman says in New Politics that the faction loyal to James had a majority.

The Committee split again in 1962, as Grace Lee Boggs and James Boggs, two key activists, left to pursue a more Third Worldist approach. The remaining Johnsonites, including leading member Martin Glaberman, reconstituted themselves as Facing Reality. James advised the group from Great Britain until it dissolved in 1970, against his urging.

James's writings were also influential in the development of Autonomist Marxism as a current within Marxist thought. He himself saw his life's work as developing the theory and practice of Leninism.

=== Return to Britain ===
In 1953, James was forced to leave the US under threat of deportation for having overstayed his visa. In his attempt to remain in America, he wrote a study of Herman Melville, titled Mariners, Renegades and Castaways: The Story of Herman Melville and the World We Live In, and had copies of the privately published work sent to every member of the Senate. He wrote the book while being detained at the immigration station on Ellis Island. In an impassioned letter to his old friend George Padmore, James said that in Mariners he was using Moby-Dick as a parable for the anti-communism sweeping the United States, a consequence, he thought, of Americans' uncritical faith in capitalism.

Returning to Britain, James appeared to Padmore and his partner Dorothy Pizer to be a man adrift. After James started reporting on cricket for the Manchester Guardian, Padmore wrote to American novelist Richard Wright: "That will take him out of his ivory tower and making his paper revolution...." Grace Lee Boggs, a colleague from the Detroit group, came to London in 1954 to work with James, but she too, saw him "at loose ends, trying to find his way after fifteen years out of the country."

In 1957, James travelled to Ghana – formerly the Gold Coast – for the celebration of its independence from British rule in March that year. He had met Ghana's new head of state, Kwame Nkrumah, in the United States when Nkrumah was studying there and had sent him on to work with George Padmore in London after the Second World War; Padmore was by this point a close Nkrumah advisor and had written The Gold Coast Revolution (1953). In correspondence sent from Ghana in 1957, James told American friends that Nkrumah thought he, too, ought to write a book on the Convention People's Party, which under Nkrumah's leadership had brought the country to independence. The book shows how the party's strategies could be used to build a new African future. James invited Grace Lee Boggs, his colleague from Detroit, to join in the work, though in the end, James wrote Nkrumah and the Ghana Revolution on his own. The book was not published until 1977 (by Allison & Busby in London), years after Nkrumah's overthrow, exile and subsequent death.

== Trinidad and afterwards ==
In 1958, James went back to Trinidad at the request of Eric Williams, who was then the island's premier, and edited The Nation newspaper, publication of Williams's pro-independence People's National Movement (PNM) party. James also became active again in the Pan-African movement. He believed that the Ghana revolution greatly encouraged the anticolonialist revolutionary struggle.

James also advocated the West Indies Federation. It was over this issue that he fell out with the PNM leadership. He resigned as editor of The Nation in 1960, and returned to Great Britain, where he joined Calvin C. Hernton, Obi Egbuna and others on the faculty of the Antiuniversity of London, which had been set up in early 1968 by a group of left-wing thinkers led by American academic Joseph Berke. In 1968, James was invited to the US, where he taught from 1970 at the University of the District of Columbia (formerly Federal City College), leaving for Trinidad in 1980.

Ultimately returning in 1981 to Britain, where Allison & Busby had in the mid-1970s begun a programme of reissuing his work, starting with a volume of selected writings, James spent his last years in Brixton, London. In 1980, he was awarded an Honorary Doctorate from South Bank Polytechnic (later to become London South Bank University) for his body of socio-political work, including that relating to race and sport.

James died in London from a chest infection on 19 May 1989, aged 88. His funeral took place on Monday, 12 June in Trinidad, where he was buried at Tunapuna Cemetery. A state memorial service was held for him at the National Stadium, Port of Spain, on 28 June 1989.

== Personal life ==
James married his first wife, Juanita Young, in Trinidad in 1929, but his move three years later to Britain led to their estrangement. He met his second wife, Constance Webb (1918–2005), an American model, actress and author, after he moved to the US in 1938; she wrote of having first heard him speak in the spring of 1939 at a meeting in California. James and Webb married in 1946 and their son, C. L. R. James Jr, familiarly known as Nobbie, was born in 1949. Separated forcibly in 1952, by James's arrest and detention on Ellis Island, the couple divorced in 1953, when James was deported to Britain, while Webb remained in New York with Nobbie. A collection of James's letters to Webb was posthumously published as Special Delivery: The Letters of C.L.R. James to Constance Webb, 1939–1948, edited and introduced by Anna Grimshaw (Oxford, UK; Cambridge, MA: Blackwell Publishers, 1996). Stories written by James for his son were published in 2006 as The Nobbie Stories for Children and Adults, edited and introduced by Constance Webb (with a foreword by Anna Grimshaw).

In 1956, James married Selma Weinstein (née Deitch), who had been a young member of the Johnson–Forest Tendency; they remained close political colleagues for more than 25 years, but divorced in 1980. She is best known as one of the founders of the International Wages for Housework Campaign.

== Legacy and recognition ==
- In the 1970s and 1980s, a number of titles by James were published by Allison & Busby (co-founder Margaret Busby's father had attended Queen's Royal College with James), including four volumes of selected writings published during his lifetime "that looked to bring together the best of James' writing and introduce him to a new audience": The Future in the Present (1977), Spheres of Existence (1980), At the Rendezvous of Victory (1984), and Cricket (1986).
- In his honour, the Nello James Centre, in Whalley Range, Manchester, was bought with funds donated by Vanessa Redgrave and bequeathed to the community in the 1970s.
- In 1976, Mike Dibb directed a film about James entitled Beyond a Boundary for the BBC Television series Omnibus. In 1984, Dibb also made a film for Channel 4 television entitled C. L. R. James in Conversation with Stuart Hall.
- In 1983, a 60-minute film, Talking History (directed by H. O. Nazareth), featuring James in dialogue with the historian E. P. Thompson, was made by Penumbra Productions, a small independent production company newly established in London, whose members included Horace Ové, H. O. Nazareth, Margaret Busby, Farrukh Dhondy, Mustapha Matura, Michael Abbensetts, and Lindsay Barrett. Penumbra Productions also filmed a series of six of James's lectures, shown on Channel 4 television. The topics were: William Shakespeare; cricket; American society; Solidarity in Poland; the Caribbean; and Africa.
- The C. L. R. James Institute was founded with James's blessing by Jim Murray in 1983. Based in New York, and affiliated to the Centre for African Studies at Cambridge University, it has been run by Ralph Dumain since Murray's death in 2003.
- A public library in the London Borough of Hackney is named in his honour. There was a C. L. R. James Week of ceremonies in March 1985, and his widow, Selma James, attended a reception there to mark its 20th anniversary. The Hackney London Borough Council had intended to drop the name of the library as part of a new development in Dalston Square in 2010, but after protests from Selma James and local and international campaigners including Andrea Enisuoh, the council promised that the library would retain the name of C. L. R. James. A council statement said: "As part of the new library, there will be a permanent exhibition to chronicle his life and works and an annual event in his memory, and we are pleased to report the state-of-the-art education room will also be named after this influential figure." The new Dalston C. L. R. James Library was officially opened on 28 February 2012. The library is housed in Collins Tower, which is named for Sir Collins (1937–2018), a music producer and co-founder of The Four Aces Club that was demolished to make way for the site. Selma James spoke at the launch on 2 March 2012 of a permanent exhibition dedicated to James's life and legacy.
- In 1986, the first play produced by Talawa Theatre Company was The Black Jacobins by James, staged at the Riverside Studios.
- In August 1996, BBC Radio 4 broadcast a five-part abridgement (by Margaret Busby) of James's Beyond a Boundary, read by Trevor McDonald and produced by Pam Fraser Solomon.
- A dramatisation of Minty Alley, by Margaret Busby (produced by Pam Fraser Solomon, with a cast that included Doña Croll, Angela Wynter, Martina Laird, Nina Wadia, Julian Francis, Geff Francis, Vivienne Rochester and Burt Caesar), was first broadcast on BBC Radio 4 on 12 June 1998, winning a Commission for Racial Equality (CRE) "Race in the Media Award" in 1999.
- In 2002, James was the subject chosen by Darcus Howe, his nephew, in an episode of the BBC Radio 4 biography series Great Lives, presented by Humphrey Carpenter.
- In 2004, English Heritage unveiled a blue plaque in Brixton, London, at 165 Railton Road (a building that housed the offices of Darcus Howe's Race Today Collective), inscribed: "C. L. R. JAMES 1901–1989 West Indian Writer and Political Activist lived and died here".
- In April 2013, a conference on "The Life and Legacy of C.L.R. James" took place in Hackney, London, with featured speakers including Selma James, Margaret Busby, Selwyn Cudjoe, Christian Hogsbjerg, Yvonne Brewster and Mike Dibb
- In May 2013, a conference to mark the 50th anniversary of the publication of Beyond a Boundary was held at the University of Glasgow.
- James is the subject of the 2016 feature-length documentary film Every Cook Can Govern: Documenting the life, impact & works of CLR James, made by WORLDwrite.
- James appeared briefly in Steve McQueen's 2020 film Mangrove, part of the Small Axe strand, portrayed by Derek Griffiths.
- On 17 March 2023, a blue plaque was unveiled in Southwick, West Sussex, to mark the house where in 1937 James wrote The Black Jacobins, at an address on Old Shoreham Road discovered by historian Christian Hogsbjerg from a letter that had been intercepted by Special Branch.
- In 2024, James received a PEN Oakland – Josephine Miles Award for Toussaint Louverture: The Story of the Only Successful Slave Revolt in History (Verso, 2023, adapted by Nic Watts and Sakina Karimjee).

== Archives ==
Collections of C. L. R. James papers are held at the University of the West Indies Alma Jordan Library, St Augustine, Trinidad, and at Columbia University Libraries.

Duke University Press publish the series "The C. L. R. James Archives", edited by Robert A. Hill, literary executor of the estate of C. L. R. James, producing new editions of books by James, as well as scholarly explorations of his oeuvre.

== Writings on cricket ==
He is widely known as a writer on cricket, especially for his autobiographical 1963 book, Beyond a Boundary, which he himself described as "neither cricket reminiscences nor autobiography". It is considered a seminal work on the game, and is often named as the best single book on cricket. John Arlott called it "so outstanding as to compel any reviewer to check his adjectives several times before he describes it and, since he is likely to be dealing in superlatives, to measure them carefully to avoid over-praise – which this book does not need ... in the opinion of the reviewer, it is the finest book written about the game of cricket." A conference to mark the 50th anniversary of its first publication was held at the University of Glasgow, 10–11 May 2013.

The book's key question, frequently quoted by modern journalists and essayists, is inspired by a line in Rudyard Kipling's poem "English Flag" – "What do they know of England who only England know?" James asks in the Preface: "What do they know of cricket who only cricket know?" Acknowledging that "To answer involves ideas as well as facts", James uses this challenge as the basis for describing cricket in an historical and social context, the strong influence cricket had on his life, and how it meshed with his role in politics and his understanding of issues of class and race.

While editor of The Nation, he led the successful campaign in 1960 to have Frank Worrell appointed the first black captain of the West Indies cricket team. James believed that the relationship between players and the public was a prominent reason behind the West Indies' achieving so much with so little.

== Selected bibliography ==
- Letters from London (series of essays written in 1932). Signal Books (2003).
- The Life of Captain Cipriani: An Account of British Government in the West Indies. Nelson, Lancs.: Cartmel & Co. (1932). New edition, with introduction by Bridget Brereton, Durham, NC: Duke University Press (2014), ISBN 978-0-8223-5639-4.
- The Case for West-Indian Self-Government.. London: Hogarth Press (1933). Reprinted, New York: University Place Bookshop (1967); Detroit: Facing Reality Publishing Co. (1967).
- Minty Alley. London: Secker & Warburg (1936). New edition, London & Port of Spain: New Beacon Books (1971).
- Toussaint Louverture: The story of the only successful slave revolt in history (play written in 1934). Produced by Peter Godfrey at the Westminster Theatre, London (1936). Durham, NC: Duke University Press (2013).
- World Revolution, 1917–1936: The Rise and Fall of the Communist International. London: Secker & Warburg (1937). New edition, with introduction by Christian Høgsbjerg, Durham, NC: Duke University Press (2017), ISBN 978-0-8223-6308-8.
- A History of Negro Revolt. Fact monograph no. 18, London (1938). Revised as A History of Pan-African Revolt. Washington: Drum and Spear Press (1969). A History of Negro Revolt, London: Creation for Liberation, ISBN 978-0947716035 (1985). As A History of Pan-African Revolt, with an Introduction by Robin D. G. Kelley, PM Press (2012).
- The Black Jacobins: Toussaint L'Ouverture and the San Domingo Revolution. London: Secker & Warburg (1938). Revised edition, New York: Vintage Books/Random House (1963). ISBN 0-679-72467-2. Index starts at p. 419. Library of Congress Card Number: 63-15043. New British edition with new foreword by James, London: Allison & Busby (1980).
- Why Negroes should oppose the war (as "J. R. Johnson"). New York: Pioneer Publishers for the Socialist Workers Party and the Young People's Socialist League – Fourth International (1939).
- "My Friends": A Fireside Chat on the War (as "Native Son"). New York: Workers Party (1940).
- The Invading Socialist Society (with F. Forest and Ria Stone). New York: Johnson Forest Tendency (1947). Reprinted with new preface, Detroit: Bewick/Ed (1972).
- Notes on Dialectics: Hegel, Marx and Lenin (Link only goes to the last half of Part 2 from the 1980 edition) (1948). New edition with Introduction, London: Allison & Busby (1980); Westport, Conn.: Lawrence Hill Books (1980).
- Notes on American Civilisation. Typescript [1950], published as American Civilization, Oxford: Blackwell (1992).
- State Capitalism and World Revolution (1950). New edition, with foreword by James and introduction by Paul Buhle, Chicago: Charles H. Kerr (1986).
- Mariners, Renegades and Castaways: The Story of Herman Melville and the World We Live In. New York: privately printed (1953). Detroit: Bewick/Ed, (1978). London: Allison & Busby (1984).
- "Every Cook Can Govern: A Study of Democracy in Ancient Greece, Its Meaning for Today". Correspondence, Vol. 2, No. 12 (June 1956). Detroit: Bewick/Ed (1992).
- Facing Reality (with Cornelius Castoriadis and Grace Lee Boggs), Detroit: Correspondence (1958). New edition, with a new Introduction by John H. Bracey, Bewick Editions (1974).
- Modern Politics (A series of lectures given at the Trinidad Public Library, in its Adult Education Programme). Port of Spain: PNM Publishing Co. (1960).
- A Convention Appraisal: Dr. Eric Williams: first premier of Trinidad & Tobago: a biographical sketch. Port of Spain, Trinidad: PNM Publishing Co. (1960).
- Party Politics in the West Indies. San Juan, Port of Spain: Vedic Enterprises (1962).
- Marxism and the intellectuals. Detroit: Facing Reality Publishing Committee (1962).
- Beyond a Boundary. London: Stanley Paul/Hutchinson (1963). New edition, London: Serpent's Tail (1983); New York: Pantheon (1984); Durham, NC: Duke University Press (1993, with introduction by Robert Lipsyte).
- Kas-kas; interviews with three Caribbean writers in Texas. George Lamming, C. L. R. James [and] Wilson Harris. Austin, TX: African and Afro-American Research Institute, University of Texas at Austin (1972).
- Not For Sale (with Michael Manley). San Francisco: Editorial Consultants (1976).
- The Future in the Present, Selected Writings, vol. 1. London: Allison & Busby (1977); Westport, Conn.: Lawrence Hill Books (1977).
- Nkrumah and the Ghana Revolution. London: Allison & Busby (1977); Westport, Conn.: Lawrence Hill Books (1977). Duke University Press, 2022, with Introduction by Leslie James.
- Spheres of Existence, Selected Writings, vol. 2. London: Allison & Busby (1980); Westport, Conn.: Lawrence Hill Books (1980).
- "Walter Rodney and the Question of Power" (text of talk at memorial symposium entitled Walter Rodney, Revolutionary and Scholar: A Tribute, at the University of California, 30 January 1981). London: Race Today Publications (1983).
- 80th Birthday Lectures (Margaret Busby and Darcus Howe, eds). London: Race Today Publications (1984). Text of lectures delivered in I981 at Kingsway Princeton College, London.
- At the Rendezvous of Victory, Selected Writings, vol. 3. London: Allison & Busby (1984; biographical introduction by Margaret Busby).
- Cricket (selected writings, ed. Anna Grimshaw). London: Allison & Busby (1986); distributed in the United States by Schocken Books (1986). As A Majestic Innings: Writings on Cricket, new edition, London: Aurum Press (2006).
- Anna Grimshaw (ed.), The C.L.R. James Reader. Oxford: Blackwell (1992).
- Scott McLemee (ed.), C.L.R. James on the Negro Question. University Press of Mississippi (1996).
- "Lectures on the Black Jacobins". Small Axe, 8 (2000): 65–112. Print.
- "They Showed the Way to Labor Emancipation: On Karl Marx and the 75th Anniversary of the Paris Commune". Originally published pseudonymously in the 18 March 1946 issue of Labor Action, newspaper of the Workers' Party of the United States; reprinted in Revolutionary History, 21 December 2008.
- "Negroes and Bolshevism". Originally published pseudonymously in Labor Action, 7 April 1947; reprinted in Revolutionary History, 21 December 2008.
- You Don't Play With Revolution: The Montreal Lectures of CLR James (edited by David Austin). AK Press (2009, ISBN 9781904859932).
- Toussaint Louverture: The Story of the Only Successful Slave Revolt in History – the 1934 play adapted into a graphic novel, by artists Nic Watts and Sakina Karimjee, published by Verso Books (2023, ISBN 9781788737906).

== See also ==
- Chaulieu–Montal Tendency
