= Minty Alley =

1936 novel by C. L. R. James

- Author: C. L. R. James
- Genre: Novel
- Publisher: Secker & Warburg
- Publication date: 1936; 90 years ago
- Publication place: United Kingdom
- Media type: Print
- OCLC: 4538462

Minty Alley is a novel written by Trinidadian writer C. L. R. James in the late 1920s. It was published in London by Secker & Warburg in 1936, as West Indian literature was starting to flourish. It was the first novel by a black West Indian to be published in England, and "earned much praise for its sensitive portrayal of the poor, especially poor women, and for its playful use of the folkloric trickster tradition in a modern context."

According to Christian Høgsbjerg, James later noted: "'the basic constituent of my political activity and outlook' was already set out in 'the "human" aspect' of Minty Alley, the unpublished novel he wrote in 1928 about the working people of one 'barrack-yard' he stayed in that summer." James arrived in the United Kingdom in 1932, intent on a career as a writer and bearing the manuscript of Minty Alley, and found employment writing about cricket for the Manchester Guardian. He soon became involved in politics, writing books about the Bolshevik Revolution and Haitian Revolution, leaving his literary ambitions behind. Minty Alley was his only novel. James died in London in 1989.

== Plot ==
Set in Port of Spain, Trinidad, the book opens with Mr. Haynes deciding to rent part of a house situated nearby on the title street—a very short alley. His mother has died, and he is trying to make the best out of an otherwise dull life. Figuring out how to pay for the house, he arrives there the following day, meeting Maisie and her aunt, Mrs. Rouse, who has a small room to let. Haynes agrees to use it after hearing of the conditions and the price—$2.50.

Early next morning, Haynes begins transferring his goods to his new home. Back at that residence, he is introduced to his new landlord, Mr. Benoit.

On the first Saturday evening of his stay, he meets a sick Miss Atwell and an East Indian servant named Philomen, as well as a cake-seller named John. Later on, Mrs. Rouse arrives with her new lodger, a nurse named Jackson, and the rest in the house engage in a lot of conversation soon after.

Yet after such good times, Haynes is bored and wants to move out of No. 2 in a month, in which case he will leave the rest up to Ella. The next morning, while Rouse and niece are attending Mass, he secretly encounters a brief love affair between Benoit and the lodger nurse. As days go by, that nurse becomes the dominant factor of life at No. 2, keeping the entire house in shape.

One morning, a stay-at-home Haynes witnesses Sonny, Nurse Jackson's son, being beaten by the landlord over his prize for winning a marbles game: a kiss for his opponent, Maisie. After a caning from the nurse, he is chased by her all the way to Haynes’ room, where he hides from her. Then, as she calls him out like she would a dog, Haynes misses his chance to save Sonny, who is intent on staying with him for protection. But upon a further caning by Sonny's mother, the bachelor decides he must move back to Ella, even with an injured foot.

That evening, the nurse comes by to check on his foot and have it treated—the first of such a series of twice-daily visits. Only some days later does his foot become any better.

Another few days pass, and the people at No. 2 are preparing to avoid the local bailiff and Mr. Brown from visiting their home. Luckily, both are nowhere to be seen; but word of the two crops up in their conversations for days afterward.

Because of a fight between her and Mrs. Rouse, the nurse soon leaves the house. Troubled times thus begin herein: another morning later, a policeman asks for Aucher, who turns out to be a thief; and quarrels between Benoit and Mrs. Rouse erupt for nights at a time, all due to the nurse's departure and her love for the landlord. Even the two try to murder each other, and for that action Haynes decides strongly to move out.

Surprisingly, Nurse Jackson passes her examinations, thanks partly to Benoit's help, but nothing more than her affair with the landlord is talked of for days at No. 2. More surprisingly, they both have been engaged, and news of their romance and upcoming marriage crops up regularly soon after.

Their wedding takes place at nine on a Sunday morning, at the start of the month, but the people at the house are getting impatient about Miss Atwell's arrival from the ceremony. When she returns at 11, she tells them everything that happened during that ceremony (the centre of attention being the nurse's expensive white fugi dress).

Later on, No. 2 is put up for mortgage, but as an ailing Mrs. Rouse is warned by Haynes, it will take eight years before the house can fully be paid off, even with her cake business on the decline. With Mrs. Rouse, Haynes learns how much the house has fared from the time it was built at the start of the First World War.

Then, upon visiting her, he learns of Ella's sickness and that a friend will replace her once she is taken to her mother in the country.

December comes, and Haynes, meeting Benoit for the first time since he married the nurse, is nervous to see how much he has changed. It is rumoured that things have not been going well for the couple, and the landlord has had no new job out of this.

In spite of their recent woes, Christmas goes on cheerfully for the residents of the house. During the holiday, a freed Aucher helps the rest of them as they work harder than ever to keep No. 2 clean, while Haynes decides to spend some time at the seaside for his health's sake.

On Boxing Day, the company at the house, Haynes included, delight themselves with an enjoyable lunch, after which Miss Atwell honours Haynes in a short speech. The bachelor's reply turns out to be "the speech of his life".

On New Year's Eve, Miss Atwell pays Haynes a visit, telling him Ella is still sick. On the New Year's holiday the following day, he pays Mrs. Rouse $20 in advance (a plan he had made with Maisie) for the sake of remaining at the house via boarding.

Three days later, he learns of the now-recovered headmistress's return to town, even though she has not come to No. 2, because Haynes feels that he does not want her. For another two or three days, he ponders on what has recently come of him.

In the midst of a quarrel between Rouse and niece, over Haynes' alienation from Ella, the bachelor is refunded his boarding fee. Now he wants to strike out vulgarly against them both.

Late one afternoon, while on a tramcar in town, Haynes encounters the nurse being arrested for stealing clothes. He hurries home to tell everyone at No. 2 about it, but all of them are hearing Philomen's account of the event as he arrives. Then Haynes reads a letter from Nurse Jackson addressed to Rouse, in which the nurse defames Rouse's past relationship with Benoit.

With Jackson on bail, gloom hangs over No. 2 once again. On the morning of her trial, everyone but Aucher is in Court to hear of the nurse's fate: she is fined £15 or three months in prison. (This is the last time Haynes will ever see her again in person.) Later, due to accusations about her husband living with another woman, the nurse and her son leave for the United States.

After the case, Haynes finds a friend—and lover—in Rouse's niece. But she wants to avoid the presence of her aunt's secret admirer, Sgt. Parkes (a father of six), for fear of a do-over of Rouse's former affairs with Benoit. She does so on the Friday morning of his visit, and for this, Haynes gets upset over Maisie. Later that afternoon, Mrs. Rouse tells him, in distaste, that Benoit has returned by surprise; and, at dusk, Aucher tells them the sergeant (whom Rouse is not interested in seeing) has come back.

For the next several weeks, Mrs. Rouse tries not to let her house be sold, without Mr. Rojas' help, to a woman who is willing to buy the property.

One day, nearly a year after his debut at No. 2, Haynes stunningly finds the major compartments of the kitchen have moved to outside for the sake of convenience. Then, he discovers just how much Philomen has changed in weight and appearance. This is due to heavy work and a love affair with Sugedo, which makes Maisie develop hatred for the servant. To avoid further trouble with Rouse, she is forced to move out of her home and live with her new employer, Gomes. A tearful farewell takes place at No. 2, whence Mrs. Rouse also cries for her before she leaves; Haynes is a part of it as well.

Just when life at No. 2 begins anew without Philomen, so its trials and tribulations resume: Maisie and some others are soon accused by Mrs. Rouse for being involved in a string of petty thefts, rising by the score. It comes to a climax one Sunday morning when Mrs. Rouse finds a dollar bill belonging to Haynes, with her niece unwilling to admit to this theft. She disappears from Haynes' sight the rest of the day.

After spending a worry-free August by the seaside while on leave, Haynes returns to No. 2 on the final day of the month—a rainy Sunday—and finds out that nothing has changed. As Mrs. Rouse calls for Maisie, right before Haynes and a few lodgers, the niece speaks out against her being treated by her aunt, and also against her aunt's past love life with Benoit.

Thus the ultimate quarrel between the two ensues on a now-muddy yard, during which Mrs. Rouse throws away all of her niece's goods out into the mire. Supporting his now almost-defeated lover, Haynes is angry at her aunt, while the niece, in revenge, ruins some of her aunt's attire amid her own outfits.

Angry at Mrs. Rouse, she sneaks away from the rest of the lodgers. Four nights later, Haynes meets her at a nearby park for the last time; she tells the bachelor of her plans for New York City. Another two days pass before she heads to the Big Apple by boat. Life at No. 2, for Haynes, will never be the same without her, and thus he cannot afford to stay there.

As September comes to an end, Rouse informs him that the former landlord has suffered a stroke, which she is not sorry to see him get. Both head to the Government Hospital that Sunday night to make sure he is there, since they are unable to visit him. The two of them leave, walking up the street—Rouse to her church for prayers, and Haynes to No. 2, where he and Miss Atwell discuss about Benoit's past and present. Rouse joins them both after her session has finished.

Late that same night, Haynes decides that he should end his life at the house, for all the effects that Maisie's immigration has left on him. Next morning, 22 September, he wakes up uneasily to the news of McCarthy Benoit's death: this event, in turn, causes regular life at No. 2 to come to an end.

Entering October, Haynes finds new lodgings with Ella's help, and this leaves Rouse and Atwell as the caretakers of the house before it can legally be sold. (Gomes [Haynes' new neighbour] and Mr. Rojas are taking over Rouse's declining cake business.)

Though his visits are less frequent in time to come, bachelor Haynes often passes by No. 2, thinking of all that used to happen there. At the end of the novel, a family of five—husband, wife and three children—happen to be its new residents.

== Characters ==
- Mr. Haynes, a 20-year-old bachelor of Creole descent.
- Ella, Haynes' house servant.
- Alice Rouse, the owner of No. 2 Minty Alley, where Haynes eventually resides.
- McCarthy Benoit, Mrs. Rouse's womanising boyfriend.
- Nurse Jackson, the lodger who develops an affair with Mr. Benoit.
- Sonny, the nurse's son.
- Philomen, an East Indian servant lady.
- Wilhelmina, another servant lady.
- Miss Atwell, a resident of No. 2 who is in defensive confinement.
- Boyce, a friend of Haynes.
- Carritt, an elder book dealer.
- Thomas Inniss (aka Aucher), a household worker who has been a thief.
- Maisie, Mrs. Rouse's niece who lives in Minty Alley.

== Release ==
Minty Alley was originally published in the United Kingdom by Secker & Warburg in 1936. A new edition of the novel was issued by New Beacon Books in 1971 (ISBN 0-901241-08-3), and in 1997 the University Press of Mississippi published a US edition (ISBN 1-5780-6027-3). In 2021, a new edition was published by Penguin Books (ISBN 978-0-241-48266-7), in the series "Black Britain: Writing Back" curated by Bernardine Evaristo.

== Reception ==
Writing in Kirkus Reviews on the 80th anniversary of Minty Alley's publication, Gregory McNamee says: "In that complex though short novel, James condenses a whole world of class and ethnic differences within the short street for which the book is named, with servants and working people scrambling to make a living while the somewhat better-off residents of the alley feud and scheme among themselves. No matter what station they hold, the people of Minty Alley do best when they work together. They all agree, though, that elsewhere is better than there, the best elsewhere of all lying far over the horizon at the end of the packet steamer route to New York City."

== Dramatisation ==
A dramatisation by Margaret Busby of Minty Alley, directed by Pam Fraser Solomon (with a cast that included Doña Croll, Angela Wynter, Martina Laird, Nina Wadia, Julian Francis, Geff Francis, Vivienne Rochester and Burt Caesar), was first broadcast on BBC Radio 4 on 12 June 1998, winning a Commission for Racial Equality (CRE) "Race in the Media Award" in 1999.
