= Bernard Glemser =

British writer (1908–1990)

Bernard Glemser (20 May 1908 – 3 April 1990), was an English writer of fiction, non-fiction, and children's books.

Born in London, Glemser served in the Royal Air Force as an intelligence officer during World War II, and then worked in the United States for the government of Britain for a few years. Subsequently, he devoted himself to writing, and his first novel, Love for Each Other, appeared in 1946. During the 1930s and 1940s he was married to the journalist and editor Louise Cripps Samoiloff. From 1947 until his death he was married to the painter and designer Violetta Constance Raditz.

One of his novels, Girl on the Wing, was made into a movie entitled Come Fly With Me (then re-issued as The Fly Girls). He wrote Radar Commandos: A Story of World War II, a highly fictionalized version of the Bruneval Raid, published in 1953. Glemser also used pen names; as Robert Crane, he wrote science fiction, notably Hero's Walk (1954), and as Geraldine Napier, romances. In nonfiction, he wrote Man Against Cancer (1969) based on his interviews with notable cancer researchers.

Glemser's books for children, such as All About the Human Body and All About Biology, were translated into many languages and distributed in Africa, Asia, and the Middle East by UNESCO.

== Bibliography ==
=== Fiction ===
- Love for Each Other (1946)
- The Twins (1946)
- High Moon (1949) (later Strange Love (1951))
- Strangers in Florida (1950)
- The Blow at the Heart (1953)
- Hero's Walk (1954) (as Robert Crane)
- Radar Commandos: A Story of World War II (1953)
- Gallery of Women (1957)
- The Lieutenant (1958)
- Girl on a Wing (1960) (later Come Fly with Me (1963), The Fly Girls (1969)
- The Pleasure of His Company (1961) (novelisation of film The Pleasure of His Company (1961))
- Girls in White Satin (1966) (as Geraldine Napier)
- Here Come the Brides (1966)
- A Dear Hungarian Friend (1966)
- A Very Special Agent (1967)
- The Seduction Agent (1969)
- The Long Safari (1970)(American title: Mr. Burkitt and Africa)
- The Super-jet Girls (1971)
- The P.R. girls (1972)
- The 60th Monarch: A Novel (1974)
- Grand Opening: A Novel (1976)
- Departing Friends (1979)

=== Non-Fiction ===
- All about the Human Body (1958)
- All about Biology (1964)
- Man against Cancer: Research and Progress (1969)
