= World Revolution (book) =

1937 book by C. L. R. James

World Revolution, 1917–1936: The Rise and Fall of the Communist International
- Author: C. L. R. James
- Language: English
- Subject: Communist International
- Genre: History
- Published: 1937
- Publisher: Secker & Warburg Ltd
- Publication place: United Kingdom

World Revolution, 1917–1936: The Rise and Fall of the Communist International was written by Trinidadian Marxist C. L. R. James and published in 1937 by Secker and Warburg. It was a pioneering Marxist analysis from a Trotskyist perspective of the history of revolutions during the interwar period and of the fundamental conflict between Leon Trotsky and Joseph Stalin after the Russian Revolution.

James, who was a leading Trotskyist activist in Britain during the 1930s, outlined Russia's transition from communist revolution to a Stalinist totalitarian state bureaucracy, building on works such as Trotsky's The Revolution Betrayed. James also provides an account of the ideological contestations within the Communist International, while examining its influence on the development of the Soviet Union and its changing role in struggles such as the German revolution of 1918–1919, the Northern Expedition, and the Spanish Civil War. He was helped when writing it by Harry Wicks and other Trotskyists, while Dorothy Pizer typed up the manuscript. The work was dedicated to the Marxist Group, of which James was then a leading member.

== Reception and influence ==
Outside of active Communists like John Ross Campbell and Andrew Rothstein, who reviewed the book negatively, the book had a very good reception overall, with Trotsky in 1939 calling it "a very good book". George Orwell in 1937 thought it "[a] very able book", while E. H. Carr in 1937 called it "decidedly useful ... in his analysis of the course of the Russian Revolution and of the point at which it took the wrong turning, Mr. James displays commendable independence of judgment and desire to arrive at the truth." The work was also critically praised by Fenner Brockway, as well as by Eugene Lyons. Among Trotskyists, the work made a considerable impact.

Although the work was banned by British colonial authorities, it was smuggled into India and G Selvarajatnan, later leader of the great strike in the Madras textile mills was converted to Trotskyism upon reading it, and Leslie Goonewardene's Rise and Fall of the Comintern published ten years afterwards in Bombay was largely based on it. An American edition was published by Pioneer Publications, New York, in 1937; the book it was reprinted by Kraus in 1970, and Hyperion Press in 1973, and Humanities Press in 1992 (with an introduction by Al Richardson). A new edition was produced in 2017 by Duke University Press to mark the centenary of the Russian Revolution.
