= Gordon K. Lewis =

Welsh historian (1919–1991)

- Born: Gordon Kenneth Lewis; 1919; Newport, Wales
- Died: August 16, 1991 (aged 71–72); San Juan, Puerto Rico
- Spouse: Sybil Farrell Lewis

Academic background
- Education: Harvard University
- Thesis: The Christian Socialist Movement in 19th Century England (1954)

Academic work
- Discipline: History
- Sub-discipline: Politics; historical sociology; economics
- Institutions: University of Puerto Rico

Gordon Kenneth Lewis (1919 – August 16, 1991) was a Welsh radical historian of the Caribbean.

== Biography ==
Born in Newport, South Wales, Lewis attended University College Cardiff, where he earned a bachelor's degree in Modern English and European History in 1940. After the war he then pursued postgraduate study at Balliol College, Oxford, and a doctorate at Harvard University. He emigrated to the Caribbean in 1950 and began his teaching career at the University of Puerto Rico, establishing himself as a leading scholar in Caribbean Studies. He was awarded an honorary doctorate from the University of the West Indies, Trinidad and Tobago, in 1984. He was Professor of Social Sciences at the University of Puerto Rico from 1951 to 1989 and also held visiting professorships at the Universities of Chicago, Harvard, Brandeis, UCLA, Florida International and the University of the West Indies.

Lewis remained in the Caribbean for more than five decades, devoted to his work in/on the region with his wife Sybil Farrell Lewis (Trinidad, 1927–2002) and his Caribbean family. He was director of the Institute of Caribbean Studies of the University of Puerto Rico from 1983 to 1987; and Sybil Farrell Lewis was the editor of the Caribbean Studies journal from 1970 to 1980. Lewis died in San Juan, Puerto Rico in 1991.

== Legacy ==
Since 2014, the Institute of Caribbean Studies at the University of Puerto Rico has held a Gordon K. & Sybil Lewis Memorial Lecture, with distinguished Caribbean scholars including Verene Shepherd, Anthony P. Maingot, Richard Price, Miguel Ceara Hatton and Hilary Beckles.

== Selected publications ==
- Puerto Rico: Freedom and Power in the Caribbean (1963)
- Growth of the Modern West Indies (1968)
- The Virgin Islands: A Caribbean Lilliput (1972)
- Notes on the Puerto Rican Revolution: An Essay on American Dominance and Caribbean Resistance (1974)
- Slavery, Imperialism and Freedom: Studies in English Radical Thought (1978)
- Main Currents of Caribbean Thought: The Historical Evolution of Caribbean Society in its Ideological Aspects, 1492-1900 (1983)
- Grenada: The Jewel Despoiled (1987)
