= Mike Dibb =

English documentary filmmaker (born 1940)

- Born: Michael Dibb; 29 April 1940 (age 86); Wharfedale, Bradford, West Yorkshire, England
- Education: Trinity College, Dublin (BA)
- Occupation: Documentary filmmaker
- Notable work: Ways of Seeing (1972); The Spirit of Lorca (1986); The Miles Davis Story (2001)
- Children: 3, including Saul Dibb
- Website: www.mikedibb.co.uk/index.php

Mike Dibb (born 29 April 1940) is an English documentary filmmaker. In almost half a century of making films mainly for television – on subjects including cinema, literature, art, jazz, sport and popular culture – "he has defined and re-defined not only the televisual art documentary genre but has been able to make moving image pieces as a form of self portraiture". Dibb has made many acclaimed films about musicians, artists and writers, including on Federico García Lorca, C. L. R. James, Astor Piazzolla, Miles Davis, Keith Jarrett, Barbara Thompson, and other notable subjects. Sukhdev Sandhu wrote in The Guardian: "In a career spanning almost five decades, it's possible Dibb has shaped more ideas and offered more ways of seeing than any other TV documentarian of his generation." Mike Dibb is the father of film director Saul Dibb.

== Career ==
After graduating from Trinity College, Dublin, Ireland, with a BA (Hons) degree, Mike Dibb joined BBC TV in 1963. He worked as an assistant film editor and film editor in the BBC Film Department until 1967, and then joined the Music and Arts Department.

Between 1967 and 1971, he directed numerous films on a range of subjects for various BBC series, including The Movies, Moviemakers at the NFT, Canvas, The Craftsmen, New Release, Omnibus. In 1972, he produced a four-part series of 30-minute films called Ways of Seeing, now regarded not only as "a landmark work of British arts broadcasting, but as a key moment in the democratisation of art education". Scripted by writer John Berger, with whom Dibb would go on to collaborate further, Ways of Seeing won a BAFTA Award for Best Specialised Series, and was the basis of a bestselling book designed by Richard Hollis, jointly published by the BBC and Penguin Books in 1972.

In 1976, Dibb made a film based on Beyond a Boundary, the classic book by C. L. R. James, and on 23 February 1979 the BBC broadcast his film based on the 1973 book The Country and the City by Raymond Williams.

In 1983, Dibb left the staff of the BBC to work independently. He joined Third Eye Productions, a company formed by several other former members of the BBC Music and Arts department, including Barrie Gavin, Peter West and Geoff Haydon. After 1986, Dibb began to make many of his films through his own company, Dibb Directions Ltd (DD).

The many notable documentaries he has made include The Spirit of Lorca, about poet Federico García Lorca (in collaboration with Lorca's biographer Ian Gibson, 1986; Gold Award NY Festival of Film and TV), and What’s Cuba Playing At? (on the Afro-Spanish roots of Cuban music; BBC Arena, 1985), Tango Maestro – The life and music of Astor Piazzolla (2005, BBC), and Keith Jarrett – The Art of Improvisation (2005, Channel 4). With Stephen Frears, in 1994 Dibb co-directed Typically British, a BFI/Channel 4 documentary on the history of British cinema.

In November 2011, Dibb participated in a masterclass in conversation with David A. Bailey as part of the International Curators Forum two-day intervention at the Arnolfini in Bristol.

His two-hour film The Miles Davis Story (DD and Channel 4 Television) won the Royal Philharmonic Society TV award and an International Emmy award for arts documentary of the year 2001.

In 2011, Dibb made the film Barbara Thompson: Playing Against Time, a 75-minute "musical-medico" documentary "about Parkinson's disease seen through the prism of music", chronicling the celebrated saxophonist's fight to keep performing despite having developed the condition. The film was first transmitted on BBC Four on 19 February 2012.

Dibb's first book, Spellwell (2010, Muswell Press), written in rhyming couplets and illustrated by Roddy Maude-Roxby, was a playful guide to the idiosyncrasies of English-language spelling.

A major online retrospective of Dibb's work A Listening Eye was curated by Matthew Harle and Colm McAuliffe for the Whitechapel Gallery in East London, running from January till March 2021.

== Select filmography ==
- 1972: Ways of Seeing (with John Berger, BBC; BAFTA Award 1972)
- 1976: Beyond a Boundary (with C. L. R. James, based on his classic book of the same name about cricket; BBC Omnibus)
- 1976: Seeing Through Drawing (with David Hockney, Jim Dine, Ralph Steadman and others; BBC)
- 1979: The Country and the City (with Raymond Williams, based on his classic study of English literature; BBC)
- 1983: Classically Cuban (on Alicia Alonso and Cuban National Ballet; BBC)
- 1984: C. L. R. James in conversation with Stuart Hall (Channel 4)
- 1984: Memories of The Future - John Ruskin and William Morris (Channel 4)
- 1985: What’s Cuba Playing At? (BBC Arena)
- 1989: Octavio Paz (BBC)
- 1991: Elmore Leonard’s Criminal Records (BBC)
- 1994: Typically British (with Stephen Frears; Channel 4/BFI)
- 1995: The Further Adventures of Don Quixote (BBC Bookmark)
- 1996: A Curious Mind - A.S. Byatt (BBC Bookmark)
- 1996: The Fame and Shame of Salvador Dalí (with Salvador Dalí biographer Ian Gibson; BBC)
- 1999: The Beginning of The End of the Affair (exploration of the real-life background to Graham Greene's celebrated novel; BBC)
- 2001: The Miles Davis Story (Channel 4)
- 2002: Studs Terkel (BBC Four profile)
- 2003: Edward Said (presented by Charles Glass, BBC Four profile)
- 2003: Steven Rose – political scientist (BBC Four profile)
- 2004: Edward Said: The Last Interview (ICA Projects)
- 2004: Tango Maestro - The Life and Music of Astor Piazzolla (DD/BBC)
- 2005: Keith Jarrett: The Art of Improvisation (Channel 4)
- 2009: Personally Speaking: A Long Conversation with Stuart Hall, interviewed by Maya Jaggi
- 2011: Barbara Thompson: Playing Against Time (BBC Four)
- 2021: Painted with My Hair (BBC Four)
