= John Christie (artist) =

British artist (born 1945)

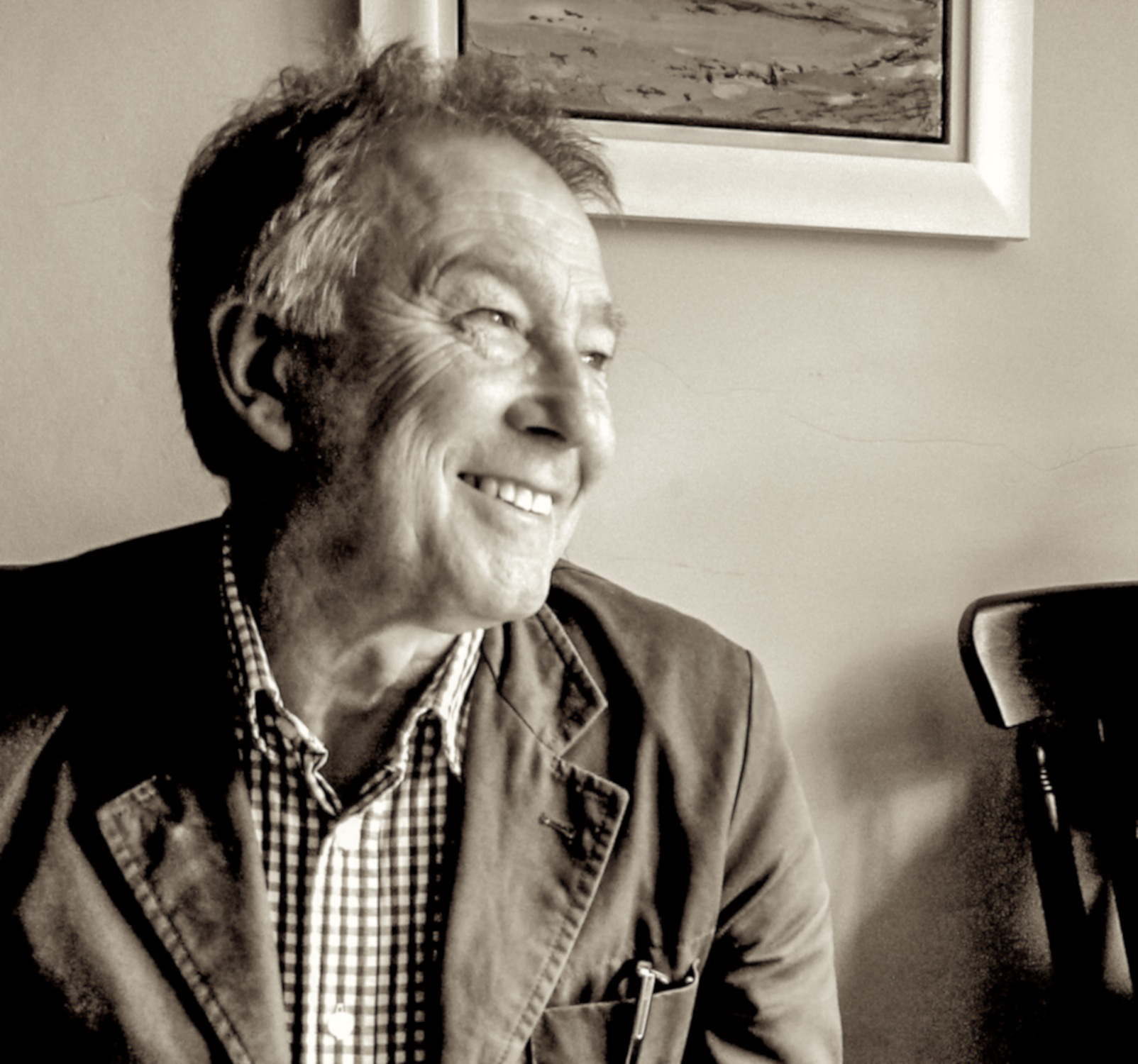
- John Christie, Photo- Ian Tyson
- Born: 1945 (age 80–81); United Kingdom
- Occupations: Artist and film-maker

John Christie is a visual artist and broadcast film-maker. As a maker of artist's books since 1975, he has produced more than 20 limited editions for both the renowned Circle Press and his own imprint Objectif. Alongside John Berger, he co-authored the award-winning book I Send You This Cadmium Red. His prints, drawings and artists’ books are in many collections worldwide including the Tate Gallery, the V&A, the Yale Center for British Art, New Haven, New York Public Library and the National Library of Australia.

As a director/cameraman his art-related TV programmes include Another Way of Telling, a BBC series on photography made in collaboration with John Berger and Jean Mohr; Salvage of Soho Photographer, a C4 documentary on John Deakin; and First Hand, a series of seven films based on literary manuscripts from the British Library. As a lighting cameraman he filmed Ian Breakwell's Continuous Diary (C4), 40 Years of Modern Art (Tate), Ian Breakwell's Public Face/Private Eye (C4), David Mach - From Hill to Castle (BBC2), David Nash - At the Edge of the Forest (BBC Wales), and The Other Side Ian Breakwell's installation produced by Anna Ridley and shown at the De La Warr Pavilion and Tate Britain.

John Christie is one of the four founding members of the award-winning East Anglian publisher Full Circle Editions and also of the Flip Side literary and music festival held at the Aldeburgh Music complex, Snape Malting's, every autumn.

== Collections ==
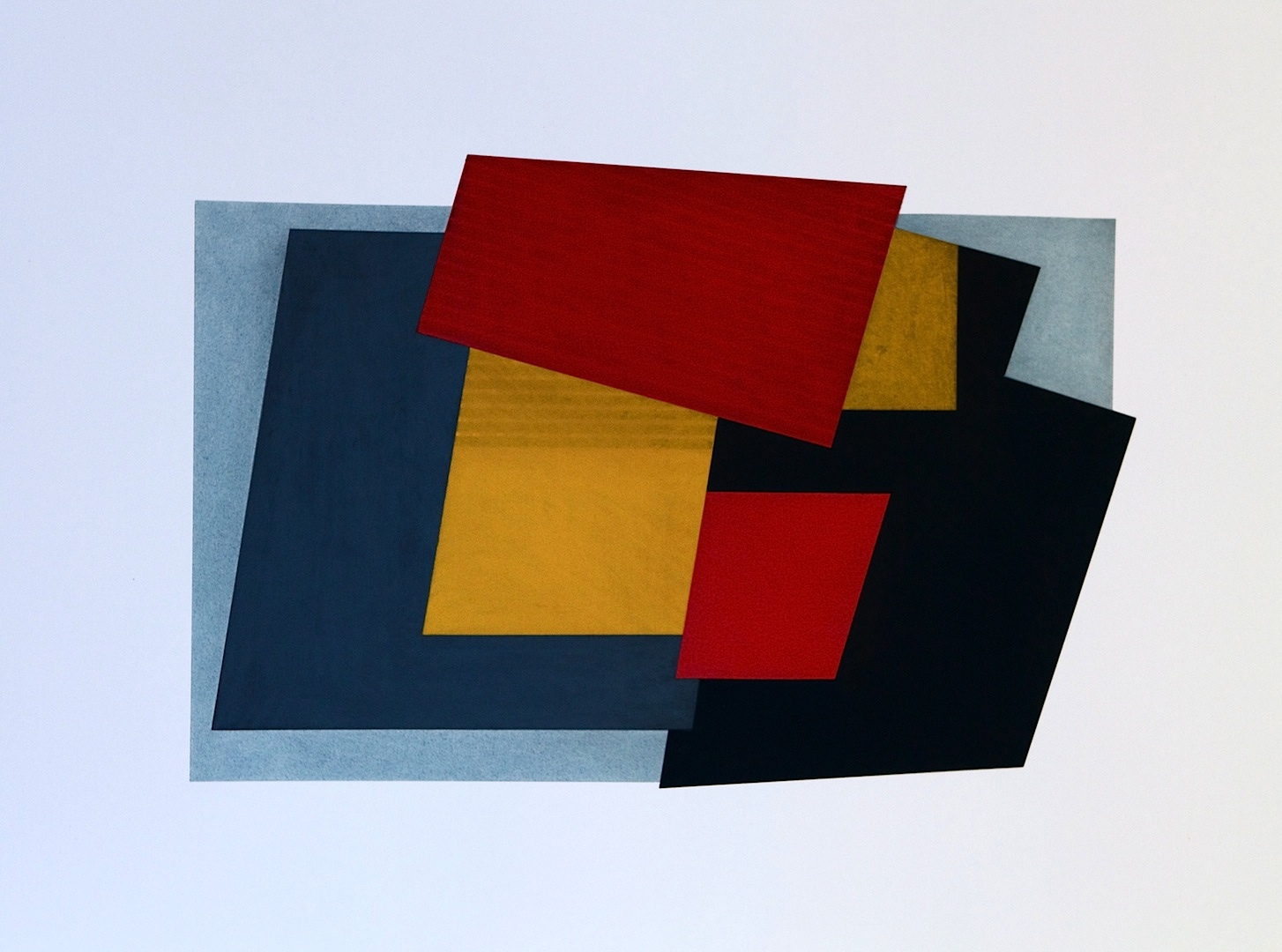
Overlappings 2 pastel on paper 2012

Selected Public and Library Collections - Artists Books, Prints, and Drawings

- Britain- Tate Gallery (books/prints); Victoria and Albert Museum (b/p); Government Art Collection (drawings); British Library (books); London College of Printing (b); Central St. Martins School of Art Library (b); Chelsea School of Art Library (b); Manchester University Library (b); Wimbledon School of Art Library (b); Winchester School of Art Library (b)
- Holland- Museum Meermanno, The Hague (books); Van Abbe Museum, Eindhoven (b)
- Australia - National Library of Australia (books/prints); Art Gallery of New South Wales (b); Sydney University Library (b); Deakin University, Victoria (b); Brisbane University (b)
- North America - Yale Center for British Art (books/prints); National Gallery of Art, Washington (b); Princeton University Library (b/p); University of Maryland (b/p); The Sackner Archive of Visual and Concrete Poetry, Miami (b/p/d); Museum of Modern Art, New York (books); New York Public Library (b); The Library of Congress (b); Getty Center Library (b); The Bridwell Library (b); Houston University (b); San Francisco Public Library (b); Walker Arts Centre, Minneapolis (b); Columbia University Library (b) Louisiana State University Library (b) John Flaxman Library, The Art Institute of Chicago (b) Green Library, Stanford University, California (b) Richard M. Ross Art Museum, Ohio Wesleyan University (p) Tang Museum, Saratoga Springs (prints)
- Canada- McGill University, Toronto (books); Thomas Fuller Library, Toronto (b)

== Films ==
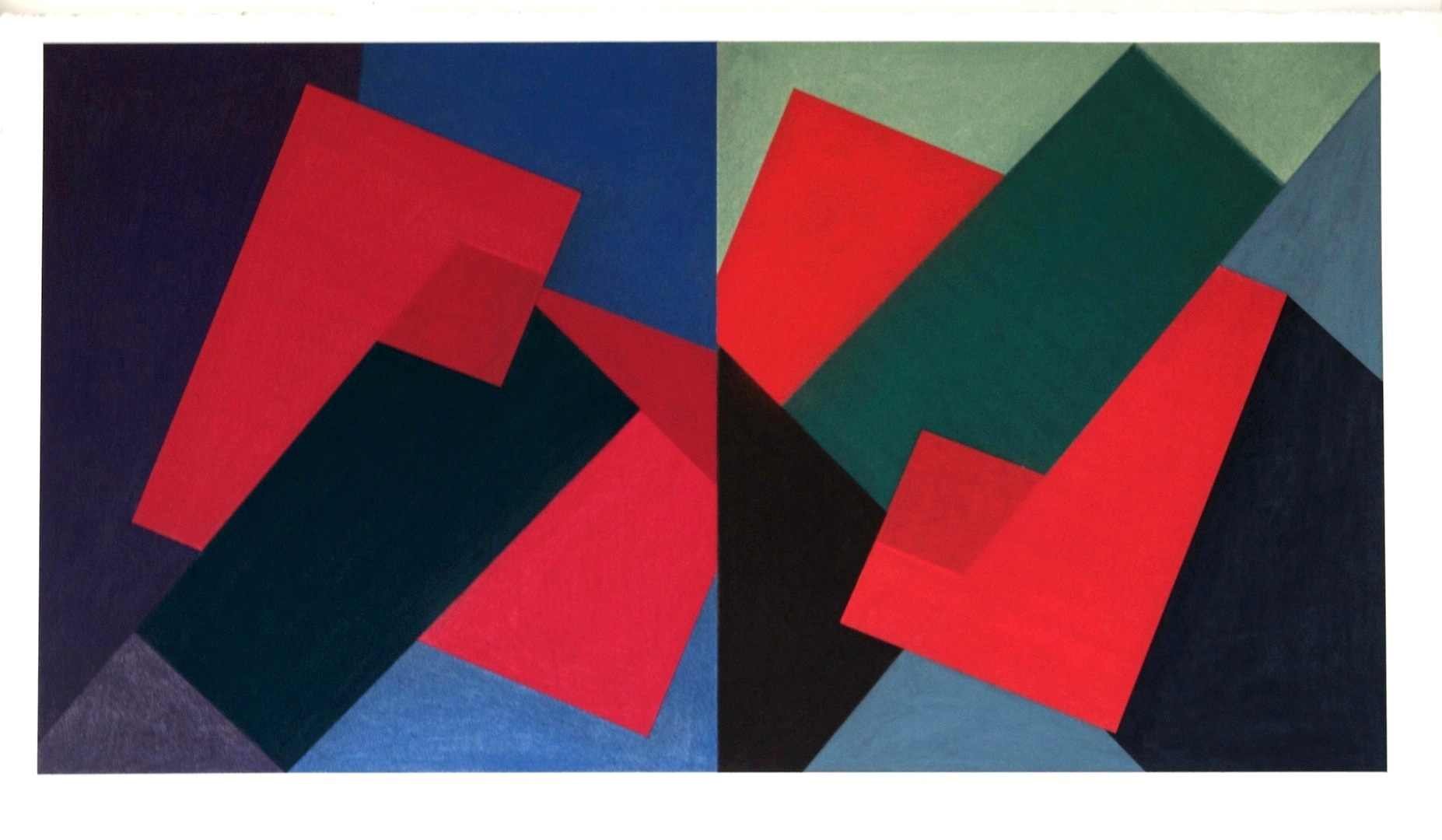
Red v Blue and Green pastel 2013

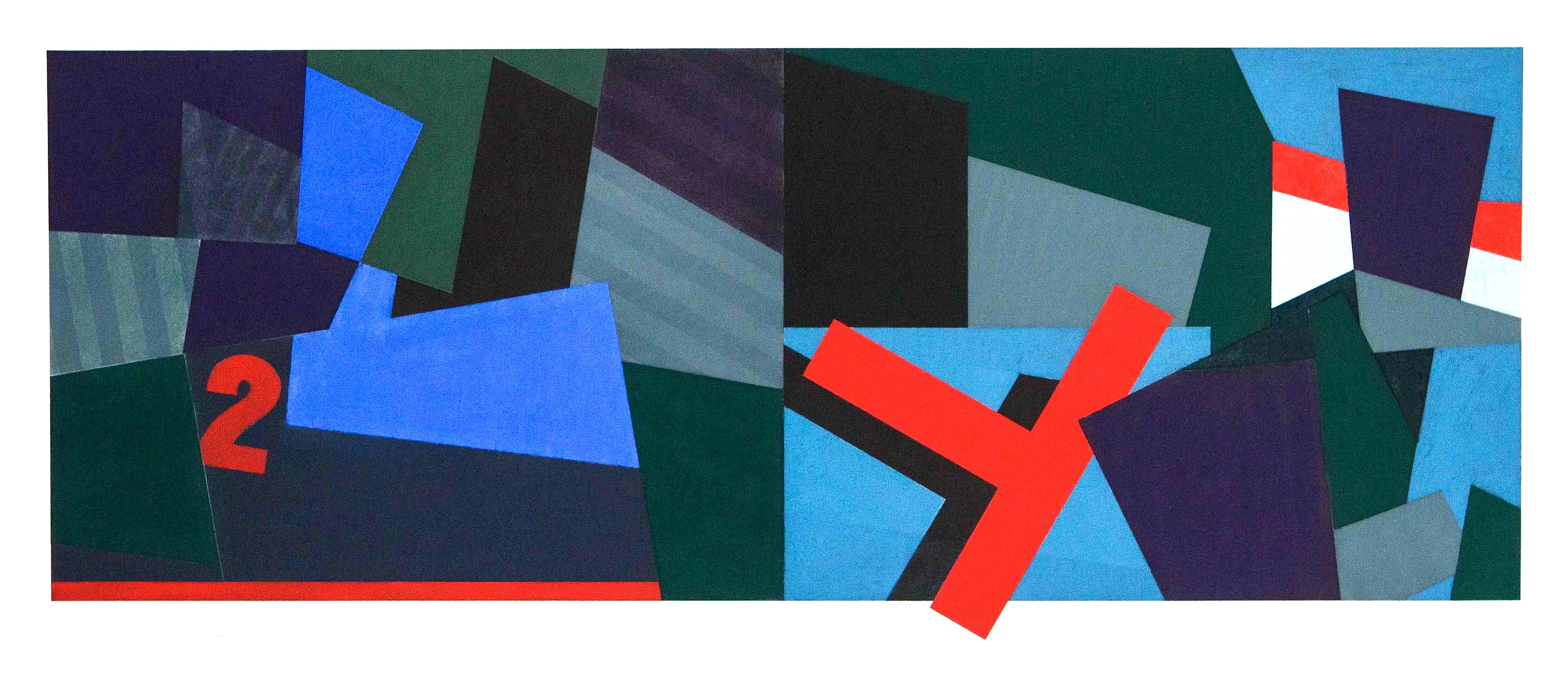
Two Blue pastel on paper 2015

as Lighting Cameraman/Producer/Director

- 1983- Ian Breakwell's Continuous Diary, Channel 4, Lighting Cameraman
- 1985- A Flow of Life - Leonard McComb RA, Arts Council, Lighting Cameraman/Producer
- 1986- 40 Years of Modern Art - Tate Gallery, Analogue, Lighting Cameraman/Producer
- 1986- Painting With Light - David Hockney, BBC 2, Lighting Cameraman
- 1986- Taking a Line on Colour - Brian Fielding, Analogue, Lighting Cameraman/Producer
- 1987- Iron Horses - Kevin Atherton, Analogue, Lighting Cameraman
- 1987- Public Face/Private Eye - Ian Breakwell, Channel 4, Lighting Cameraman
- 1988- Another Way of Telling - John Berger and Jean Mohr, BBC 2, Director - four-part series
- 1990- The New British Library - British Library, Director
- 1990- TV Pieces - Artist's Video Works, Channel 4, Lighting Cameraman
- 1991- Salvage of a Soho Photographer - John Deakin, Channel 4, Director
- 1993- From Hill to Castle - David Mach, BBC 2, Lighting Cameraman
- 1993- At the Edge of the Forest - David Nash, BBC Wales, Lighting Cameraman
- 1999- First Hand - British Literary Manuscripts, Channel 4, Director
- 2002- Cadmium Red - short film, Director
- 2002- The Other Side - Ian Breakwell Installation at Tate Britain & De La Warr Pavilion, Analogue, Lighting Cameraman

== Other publications ==
- 1990- Seeing in the Dark - A Compendium of Cinemagoing - contributor to an anthology of experiences in the cinema (Serpent's Tail)
- 1994- Brought to Book - contributor to an anthology of stories concerning books and reading (Penguin Books)
- 1995- Co-producer with Bill Furlong, Audio Arts Supplement - John Berger reading Pages of the Wound
- 1996- Co-designer of the Bloomsbury paperback edition of Pages of the Wound
- 1997- Tate Magazine (issue 11) Steps Towards a Small Theory of the Visible - a text and image collaboration with John Berger
- 1999- Tate magazine (issue 19) Corresponding Colours - six page feature on Cadmium Red
- 2000- I Send You This Cadmium Red published by ACTAR, Barcelona
- 2000- Red Letter Days - The Independent on Sunday, four page feature on Cadmium Red
- 2000- Cadmium Red nominated by The New York Times as one of the ten best art books of the year
- 2001- Cadmium Red awarded first prize for graphic design (Premis Laus) by ADGFAD, Barcelona
- 2002- I Send You This Cadmium Red - Between the Ears, BBC Radio 3 feature with music by Gavin Bryars
- 2010- I Send You This Cadmium Red & The Island Chapel - CD with music by Gavin Bryars (BCGBCD05)
- 2011/14- I Send You This Cadmium Red - stage performance by Art of Time Ensemble, Toronto, Canada
- 2015- Blue, Blue Elefante (Uruguay) - photographs for the book by Eulalia Bosch (Barcelona)
- 2015- Cuatro horizontes (Four Horizons) - an account of the trip to Le Corbusier's Ronchamp chapel with John Berger, Sister Lucia Kuppens and Sister Telchilde Hinkley
- 2016- Lapwing and Fox: conversations between John Berger and John Christie published by OBJECTIF, UK - This book records a recent exchange of letters and small books sent between the two friends over a three-year period (2011–14). Complementing their correspondence on the subject of colour, 'I Send You This Cadmium Red' published in 2000, Lapwing and Fox covers a wide range of ideas and thoughts surrounding art and artists, drawing and painting, nature and place.
- 2017- Seeing Through Drawing: A Celebration of John Berger published by OBJECTIF, UK - This book is both a celebration of John Berger's love of drawing and a space where his friends and family remember and pay tribute to this remarkable writer and artist who died on 2 January 2017. Edited and with an Introduction by John Christie the book has contributions from Katya Berger Andreadakis, Yves Berger, Geoff Dyer, Anne Michaels, Tom Overton, Gareth Evans, Martin Battye and Paul Gordon. The book is also in part a catalogue for the exhibition Seeing Through Drawing at Mandell's Gallery, Norwich (July/August 2017) which featured original drawings by John Berger plus work by over 30 artists to whom Berger's fiction and critical writings were important influences.
- 2017- Lapwing and Fox voted 'Book of the Year' at the East Anglian Book Awards.
