= Edwin St Hill =

West Indian cricketer (1907–1957)

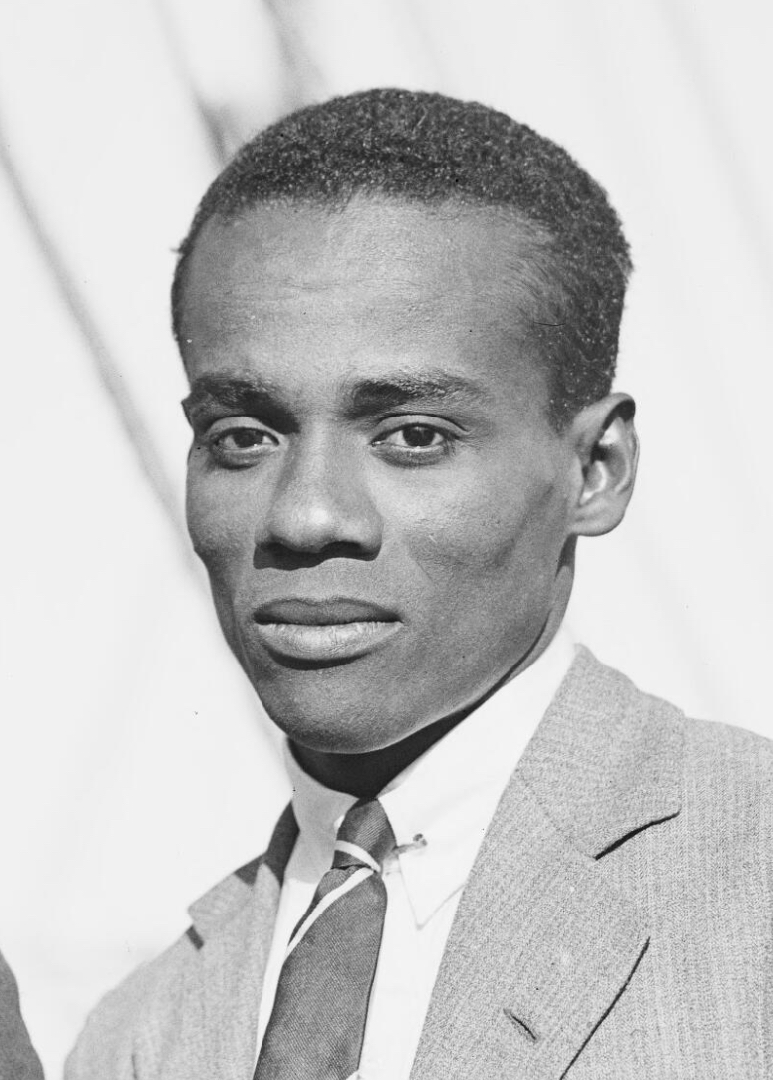

Personal information
- Full name: Edwin Lloyd St Hill
- Born: 9 March 1904; Port of Spain, Trinidad and Tobago
- Died: 21 May 1957 (aged 53); Manchester, England
- Batting: Right-handed
- Bowling: Right-arm medium pace
- Relatives: Wilton St Hill (brother); Cyl St Hill (brother)

International information
- National side: West Indies
- Test debut (cap 19): 11 January 1930 v England
- Last Test: 21 February 1930 v England

Domestic team information
- Years: Team
- 1923–1930: Trinidad

Career statistics
Competition	Test	First-class
Matches	2	17
Runs scored	18	274
Batting average	4.50	11.91
100s/50s	0/0	0/1
Top score	12	67
Balls bowled	558	4,619
Wickets	3	64
Bowling average	73.66	28.62
5 wickets in innings	0	1
10 wickets in match	0	1
Best bowling	2/110	6/117
Catches/stumpings	0/–	11/–
- Source: CricketArchive, 9 February 2011

Edwin Lloyd St Hill (9 March 1904 – 21 May 1957) was a Trinidadian cricketer who played two Test matches for the West Indies in 1930. His brothers, Wilton and Cyl, also played for Trinidad and Tobago; in addition, the former played Test matches for the West Indies.

St Hill first played local cricket in with some success and graduated to the Trinidad and Tobago team. He played regularly for the next five years but was not selected for any representative West Indian teams. His increased success in 1929 attracted the attention of the West Indies selectors, and he played two Test matches against England in 1930.

Although not particularly successful, he bowled steadily and was chosen to tour Australia with the West Indies in 1930–31. He was fairly effective in first-class games but the form of the other fast bowlers in the team meant that he was not chosen for any of the Test matches.

By the time the tour was over, St Hill had signed a contract to play professional cricket in the Lancashire League in England for Lowerhouse Cricket Club. Playing as an all-rounder, he performed relatively well with bat and ball for three seasons from 1931 to 1933. He then played as a professional in several leagues, including the Huddersfield and Bradford leagues.

During the Second World War, he joined the British Army and took part in the Dunkirk evacuation before returning to England; he resumed his league career and played many wartime charity games. He died in Manchester, aged 53.

== Early life and career ==
St Hill was born in Port of Spain, Trinidad and Tobago in 1904, and according to the writer C. L. R. James, his family were lower middle-class. His brothers, Wilton and Cyl, played cricket for Trinidad and Tobago; in addition, the former played Test matches for the West Indies. St Hill first played in the Bonanza Cup, Trinidad and Tobago's main cricket competition, for a club called Durban Cricket Club in 1922; critics judged him to be promising, but he had little success. The following year, he moved to play for Shannon. Cricket in Trinidad and Tobago at the time was divided along racial lines. Shannon was a club associated with black lower middle-class players such as teachers or clerks. The team contained many strong bowlers, and St Hill opened the bowling.

St Hill's success with Shannon was noticed by the regional selectors, and in 1924 he progressed to the Trinidad and Tobago team; he made his first-class debut against British Guiana in the Inter-Colonial Tournament on 14 February 1924. He opened the bowling with his Shannon team-mate, Learie Constantine, and took six wickets in the match. He played in the next game, the final of the tournament against Barbados, and took a further five wickets in the game, but his team lost.

Over the following five years, he played regularly for Trinidad and Tobago, and bowled with success for Shannon. He took four for 99 in an innings against British Guiana but otherwise did not take more than three wickets in an innings until the 1929–30 season, and after scoring 35 in his second game, he did not pass 20 runs in an innings. Apart from two games for Trinidad and Tobago against the touring Marylebone Cricket Club (MCC) touring team in 1926, all his games came for Trinidad and Tobago in the Intercolonial Tournament.

He was overlooked for the representative West Indies team to play the MCC in 1926, several bowlers being ahead of him in terms of selection. Neither was he selected for any of the trial games held to assist in choosing a team in 1928; that year, a West Indies team, including his brother Wilton, toured England and played its first Test matches.

Instead, St Hill, between June and August 1928, took part in a tour of the United States by a "West Indian XI", playing mainly against teams of expatriate West Indians. He was very successful, taking over 100 wickets at a low cost.

== West Indian cricketer ==
St Hill in 1928

=== Selection for Test team ===
In the October 1929, St Hill recorded his best first-class bowling figures when he took six for 119 (six wickets for 119 runs) against British Guiana in the final of the Intercolonial Tournament; he took four wickets in the second innings to give him ten in the match, and also scored 67 in Trinidad and Tobago's second innings. Although he recorded his best performances with bat and ball, Trinidad and Tobago still lost. By the following month, the Trinidad Sporting Chronicle considered him among the "second string" of players who were on the borderline of selection for the West Indies team.

In 1930 the Marylebone Cricket Club (MCC) undertook a tour of the West Indies which included four Test matches—the first Tests to be played in the West Indies. The MCC side was not at full international strength; it included players who were either just beginning or just ending their international careers, and several star English bowlers were missing. (Note: On most MCC tours of the lesser Test playing countries, leading players often chose not to tour, opting to rest at home. The side was usually competitive enough without them, and only on the more taxing tour of Australia was a fully representative team selected.)

The first Test was played in Barbados and St Hill was selected, making his debut for the West Indies on 11 February 1930. He scored 0 and 12 with the bat, took two for 110 from 35 overs in the first innings and was wicketless in the second. The match was drawn. The MCC then travelled to Trinidad and Tobago and played the cricket team in two games. St Hill played in the first, taking four wickets, but was rested from the second. The Trinidad Sporting Chronicle stated that he was omitted specifically to be ready for the second Test, also played in Trinidad and Tobago, although he had not asked for a rest. The newspaper questioned why he had then been left out of the team for the Test match, and reported speculation that his omission was for political reasons to discredit the leadership of George Dewhurst, the Trinidad and Tobago captain in the second game. It suggested that, given his ability with bat and ball, St Hill was worth a net 100 runs to any team in which he played. Having been omitted from the second Test, which West Indies lost, St Hill played in the third in British Guiana. West Indies won the game; St Hill batted at number eleven in the batting order in his first innings, at number five in the second and scored three runs in each innings. With the ball, he took only one wicket and did not play another Test.

A review of the series in the Barbados Advocate suggested that St Hill bowled steadily during both his Test appearances, but that his economical bowling figures in British Guiana were slightly unrepresentative as the English batsmen had been concentrating entirely on defence. The article stated that St Hill was more effective on matting pitches than on turf, (Note: Matting pitches were used as an alternative to turf in some parts of the world where it was difficult to produce a good grass pitch. The matting was made of jute or coir, and laid over a surface which may have been sand, grass, soil or gravel.) but that he had many supporters in Trinidad and Tobago. It believed he warranted a place on the forthcoming West Indian tour of Australia, but that he needed to work on his fielding, which was weak.

In August 1930, St Hill signed a contract to play professional cricket in the Lancashire League in England, which meant that he was no longer eligible to play cricket for Shannon or Trinidad and Tobago. At the time, competition rules barred professional cricketers from taking part. Consequently, the first-class matches he played in Australia were the last of his career. In his eight seasons in the Bonanza Cup, St Hill took 224 wickets at an average of 9.42, and topped the bowling averages for the competition in 1924 and 1929.

=== Tour to Australia ===
The West Indies played five Test matches in Australia in the 1930–31 season. They lost the series 4–1 and could not match the Australian team. St Hill played seven matches on the Australia tour, including four that were first-class, but did not feature in any of the Tests. Against Tasmania he had first-innings figures of four for 57 and against Victoria he took six wickets in the game. In total, he took 16 wickets at an average of 29.81, but his highest score in eight innings was 9.

A summary of the tour printed in the Sporting Chronicle of Trinidad and Tobago suggested that St Hill had bowled well during his limited opportunities, but the success and form of the other three fast bowlers in the team meant that he had little chance to reach the Test team or to distinguish himself. A later article in the Daily Gleaner of Jamaica suggested that "sources" had told the newspaper "the reason for the infrequent playing of Edwin St Hill", but did not elaborate.

After this tour, St Hill played no further first-class cricket. In 17 games, he scored 274 runs at an average of 11.91 and took 64 wickets at 28.62.

== Professional cricketer in England ==
=== With Lowerhouse ===
For the 1931 season, Lowerhouse, the Lancashire League club which had finished bottom of the league in 1931, signed St Hill as their professional cricketer. He was one of three West Indians playing professional league cricket in England, the others being Learie Constantine and George Francis. Early in the season, he spoke publicly to express his thanks for the welcome he had received.

In 1931, Lowerhouse finished in equal fourth place, its best position in the league since 1908. Reviewing the season, the Burnley News gave credit to St Hill for the revival. Describing him as a dependable batsman, it stated that he had a big impact with the ball. He scored 288 runs at 14.40, with a top score of 46, to finish third in the club batting averages. He topped the bowling averages with 68 wickets, 46 of which were bowled, at 12.20. By the following season, St Hill's wife had joined him in Lowerhouse. An end of season summary in the Burnley Express suggested that his batting had improved, and that he had surprised people with his ability. He played several longer innings, with a highest score of 85, and he scored runs by "delightfully played cricket". He headed the batting and bowling averages for the club with 477 runs at 20.73 and 77 wickets at 13.87. However, the report stated that his bowling had been inconsistent and that it was surprising that he ended with such a good average. Nevertheless, his figures stood comparison with other leading professionals in the Lancashire League. The club dropped to equal fifth in the league.

St Hill's contract ended in 1933, a less successful season for the club. Lowerhouse finished equal 11th. St Hill topped the batting and bowling averages again. He increased his batting average to 28.66 in scoring 602 runs, including a century, and according to the Burnley Express, gave "some delightful batting exhibitions". With the ball, he was less successful, taking 56 wickets at 18.82. By then, St Hill had signed a new contract to play for Slaithwaite cricket club in the Huddersfield League. St Hill stated that he had been treated very kindly at Lowerhouse. At the end of the season, he returned to Trinidad and Tobago for the winter. At this stage of his career, although his progress was still followed by the press in the West Indies, he was no longer a realistic Test match prospect. Other West Indians who played league cricket continued to be selected for the Test team, or to be considered for selection.

=== Later life and career ===
Slaithwaite were a moderate club in the Huddersfield League, where the quality of cricket was not as strong as in the Lancashire League. St Hill spent just one season at Slaithwaite; his contract was not renewed at the end of the season, but the club awarded him a benefit match, in which Slaithwaite played a team chosen by Learie Constantine. During the season, he was selected for the team to represent the Huddersfield League against the Bradford League.

St Hill subsequently played in the Bradford League, first for East Bierley cricket club, then, in 1937, he signed for Spen Victoria for whom he played until 1939. He was particularly successful for Spen Victoria; for instance, in 1939 he was the first bowler in the league to reach 50 wickets, but at the time the Bradford League had fallen in both popularity and standards. He missed the 1940 season — he had joined the army and took part in the Dunkirk evacuation. But he returned the following season, after being demobilised, and remained in the Bradford League until the end of the Second World War. He also appeared in several wartime charity games; many were for a "West Indies XI" made up of West Indians living or working in England in wartime.

In 1947, St Hill returned to Slaithwaite, where he acted as the team's reserve professional. By 1948, he was playing as a professional at Kearsley cricket club in the Bolton Cricket League. In later years, the cricketer Jack Bond recalled St Hill as a very effective coach at the club, where Bond spent his early years. St Hill continued playing league cricket until 1951.

== Death ==
St Hill died in Withington, Manchester, on 21 May 1957, aged 53.

== Style and technique ==
St Hill's bowling style led critics to name him the "Maurice Tate of the West Indies"; Tate was a leading English bowler of the period who took 155 Test match wickets. In the late-1920s, St Hill was judged to be a cricketer of potential. At the time, a critic in Barbados rated him "medium to fast", but noted that he was not as effective on turf pitches as he was on matting, and his fielding was weak. An article in the Trinidad Sporting Chronicle from the same period named him as "the best fast medium bowler in the West Indies". It noted that he was capable of bowling to slow the scoring of runs, or to attempt to dismiss the batsmen, a good fielder and a fast-scoring batsman. It called him a "real Test match cricketer", and "a player whose accuracy of length, swerve and pace makes him an asset to any team and the equal of Constantine and Griffith at their best." At the time he joined Lowerhouse, a profile in a Burnley newspaper stated that he was a steady bowler who kept to a consistent good length. Additionally, he was a good, although "impetuous" batsman.

More recent writers have judged him by his mediocre Test and first-class statistical record. The cricket writer Martin Williamson, writing on the ESPNCricinfo website, believes his two Test match performances to have been "unimpressive" and judges: "In fairness, he was no more than a moderate late-order batsman and regulation medium-pacer". Tony Barker, in his history of the Bradford League, calls St Hill "moderately talented", and suggests that his success for Spen Victoria shows that the standard of play in the league at the time was poor. In her book on West Indian Test cricketers, Bridgette Lawrence describes him as "a capable all-rounder" who "performed modestly" in his only Test series.

== Bibliography ==
- Barker, Tony (2009). Cricket's Wartime Sanctuary: The First-Class Flight to Bradford. Cardiff: Association of Cricket Statisticians and Historians. ISBN 978-1-905138-74-6.
- James, C. L. R. (1983) [1963]. Beyond a Boundary. London: Serpent's Tail. ISBN 1-85242-358-7.
- Lawrence, Bridgette (1995). Masterclass. The Biography of George Headley. Leicester: Polar Publishing (UK) Ltd. ISBN 1-899538-05-4.
- Lawrence, Bridgette; Goble, Ray (1991). The Complete Record of West Indian Test Cricketers. Leicester: ACL and Polar Publishing (UK) Ltd. ISBN 0-9514862-2-5.
- Manley, Michael (1995) [1988]. A History of West Indies Cricket. London: Andre Deutsch. ISBN 0-233-98937-4.
