= G. (novel) =

1972 novel by John Berger

- First edition
- Author: John Berger
- Language: English
- Publisher: Weidenfeld & Nicolson
- Publication date: 1972
- Publication place: United Kingdom
- Media type: Print
- Pages: 318
- Awards: Guardian Fiction Prize; James Tait Black Memorial Prize; Booker Prize
- ISBN: 0-297-99423-9

G. is a 1972 novel by English writer John Berger, set in pre–First World War Europe. Its protagonist, named "G.", is a Don Juan– or Casanova-like lover of women who gradually comes to political consciousness after misadventures across the continent.

Berger's experimental, non-linear narrative novel won the Guardian Fiction Prize, the James Tait Black Memorial Prize for fiction and the Booker Prize.

At the 1972 Booker Prize ceremony, Berger criticised the sponsor Booker-McConnell for exploiting trade in the Caribbean for the past 130 years. Berger also gave half of the prize money to the British Black Panther movement, declaring his intention "to share the prize with those West Indians in and from the Caribbean who are fighting to put an end to their exploitation."

== Reception ==
Reviewing the novel in The New York Times, academic Leo Braudy stated: "Part of the power and fascination of 'G.' comes from this extraordinary mixture of historical detail and sexual meditation—for at the intersection of G. and history is Berger's attitude toward heroism. ... 'G.'—in addition to its vividly portrayed characters and the crashing immediacy of its historical settings—is a complex novel of ideas that sets off in the reader meditations about sex, history and the nature of the novel."

Kirkus Reviews described it as "an arresting, inordinately vital, impersonal, and remarkable work."
