= A Seventh Man =

1975 book by John Berger and Jean Mohr

- Author: John Berger, Jean Mohr
- Publication date: 1975

A Seventh Man is a book, in the form of photography and text by John Berger and Jean Mohr, on migrant workers in Europe. It was first published in 1975.
