= Pig Earth =

1979 novel by John Berger

- First edition
- Author: John Berger
- Language: English
- Series: Into Their Labours
- Publisher: Writers and Readers
- Publication date: 1979
- Publication place: United Kingdom
- Media type: Print (Hardback & Paperback)
- Pages: 213 p
- ISBN: 0-906495-05-9
- OCLC: 6378377
- Dewey Decimal: 823/.914
- LC Class: PR6052.E564 P54 1980
- Followed by: Once in Europa

Pig Earth is a novel by John Berger published in 1979. It is the first in his Into Their Labours trilogy, which is completed by Once in Europa and Lilac and Flag. The trilogy combines fiction with poetry and political essay to depict "the displacement of peasant communities and the destruction of peasant land". The first two books are set in a French Alpine village, with the final book following the villagers when they are uprooted to the city.

The New York Times praised Berger's ability to make the French peasant language sound authentic and "his choice of minutely observed detail". It called the long central story in Pig Earth, "The Three Lives of Lucie Cabrol", his masterpiece.

Kirkus Reviews was unimpressed, finding both style and story "too lean to support the socio-historical baggage, and so ultimately we are left with stories – most of them with a Marxist tendency to glorify the noble peasant – of cows being butchered and goats mated, of mysteriously-knowing dwarf girls and grandfathers".
