= Ways of Seeing =

1972 book and TV documentary by John Berger and Mike Dibb

- Author: John Berger
- Cover artist: René Magritte
- Language: English
- Subject: Art, architecture, photography
- Publisher: Penguin Books
- Publication date: 1972
- Publication place: U.K.
- Pages: 166
- ISBN: 0-14-013515-4
- OCLC: 23135054

Ways of Seeing is a 1972 television series of 30-minute films created chiefly by writer John Berger and producer Mike Dibb. It was broadcast on BBC Two in January 1972 and adapted into a book of the same name.

The series was intended as a response to Kenneth Clark's Civilisation TV series, which represents a more traditionalist view of the Western artistic and cultural canon, and the series and book criticise traditional Western cultural aesthetics by raising questions about hidden ideologies in visual images. According to James Bridle, Berger "didn't just help us gain a new perspective on viewing art with his 1972 series Ways of Seeing – he also revealed much about the world in which we live. Whether exploring the history of the female nude or the status of oil paint, his landmark series showed how art revealed the social and political systems in which it was made. He also examined what had changed in our ways of seeing in the time between when the art was made and today."

The series has had a lasting influence, and in particular introduced the concept of the male gaze, as part of Berger's analysis of the treatment of the nude in European painting. It soon became popular among feminists, including the British film critic Laura Mulvey, who used it to critique traditional media representations of the female character in cinema.

== Episodes ==
No.	Title	Original release date
1	"Episode 1 – Camera and Painting"	8 January 1972
The first part of the television series drew on ideas from Walter Benjamin's 1935 essay "The Work of Art in the Age of Mechanical Reproduction", arguing that through reproduction an Old Master's painting's modern context is severed from that which existed at the time of its making.
2	"Episode 2 – Women and Art"	15 January 1972
The second film discusses the female nude. Berger asserts that only twenty or thirty nudes in the European oil painting tradition depict a woman as herself rather than as a subject of male idealisation or desire.
3	"Episode 3 – Painting and Possessions"	22 January 1972
The third programme is on the use of oil paint as a means of depicting or reflecting the status of the individuals who commissioned the work of art.
4	"Episode 4 – Fine Arts and Commerce"	29 January 1972
In the fourth programme, on publicity and advertising, Berger argues that colour photography has taken over the role of oil paint, though the context is reversed. An idealised potential for the viewer (via consumption) is considered a substitution for the actual reality depicted in old master portraits.

== Book ==
The book Ways of Seeing was written by Berger and Dibb, along with Sven Blomberg, Chris Fox, and Richard Hollis. The book consists of seven numbered essays: four using words and images; and three essays using only images.

Now described as "revolutionary", the book has contributed to feminist readings of popular culture, through essays that focus particularly on how women are portrayed in advertisements and oil paintings. "Berger ... has had a profound influence on the popular understanding of art and the visual image," according to sociologists Yasmin Gunaratnam and Vikki Bell.

== Reception and legacy ==
The book and television series were considered groundbreaking. A 1994 critic noted:

There is one occasion when other voices are introduced, in the second programme, about representations of women – reflecting Berger's awareness that he's been speaking on behalf of women too long. About two-thirds through, he says he's shown what he's done so far to 'five women', and asked them to discuss it. The discussion occupies the rest of the time. A clear gesture of openness. But the 'five women' remain unnamed until the closing credits. They are women. And Berger himself actually sits in on the discussion – in fact he chairs it, with complete confidence in the non-prejudicial nature of his own presence.
