= Richard Hollis =

British graphic designer (born 1934)

Richard Hollis Hon. FRSL
- Born: 1934 (age 90–91); London, England
- Education: Chelsea School of Art; Wimbledon School of ArtCentral School of Arts and Crafts
- Known for: Graphic design
- Spouse(s): Posy Simmonds, m. 1974
- Children: 2
- Elected: Royal Designer for Industry, 2005
- Website: www.richardhollis.com

Richard Hollis Hon. FRSL (born 1934) is a British graphic designer. He has taught at various art schools, written books, and worked as a printer, as a magazine editor and as a print-production manager. Hollis was elected as an Honorary Fellow of the Royal Society of Literature in 2019.

== Biography ==
Hollis was born in London and studied art and typography at Chelsea School of Art, Wimbledon School of Art and Central School of Art and Crafts in London, before moving to Paris in the early 1960s.

Back in the UK, he designed the quarterly journal Modern Poetry in Translation, became the art editor of the weekly magazine New Society and later created John Berger's Ways of Seeing. He designed the visual identity and marketing material for the Whitechapel Art Gallery in London. He also co-founded the School of Design at West of England College of Art.

His About Graphic Design was published in 2012, Graphic Design. A Concise History in 2001, and Swiss Graphic Design: The Origins and Growth of an International Style, 1920–1965 in 2006. Hollis's body of work consistently suggests a strong connection between graphic design and the cultural and social conditions that inspire it.

In 2005, he was made one of the two hundred Royal Designers for Industry of the Royal Society for the Encouragement of Arts, Manufactures and Commerce.

Hollis's About Graphic Design was published in 2012 by Occasional Papers. The book, which was also designed by Hollis, is a comprehensive selection of writings covering over 40 years of reflection on graphic design history, including interviews, essays, letters, articles, lectures and course outlines.

Hollis's book Henry van de Velde: The Artist as Designer (2019) was the first major study of van de Velde's work in English in 30 years; it was supported by the Flemish government and published by Occasional Papers.

In 2019, Hollis was elected as an Honorary Fellow of the Royal Society of Literature. He was also made an Honorary Fellow of the University of the Arts London in 2019.

== Personal life ==
In 1974, Hollis married illustrator and writer Posy Simmonds.

== Bibliography ==
- Graphic Design: A Concise History, London: Thames & Hudson, 1994; 2nd enlarged edition, 2001 (also in French, Spanish, Portuguese and Chinese).
- (With Lutz Becker) Avant-Garde Graphics 1918–1934, London: Hayward Gallery, 2004.
- Swiss Graphic Design: The Origins and Growth of an International Style, London: Laurence King (UK), ISBN 978-1-85669-487-2; New Haven: Yale University Press; and as Schweizer Grafik, Basel: Birkhäuser, 2005.
- About Graphic Design, Occasional Papers, 2012, ISBN 978-0-9569623-1-7.
- Henry van de Velde: The Artist as Designer, from Art Nouveau to Modernism, Occasional Papers, 2019, ISBN 978-0-9954730-5-8.
