= Wilton St Hill =

Trinidadian cricketer

Personal information
- Full name: Wilton H. St Hill
- Born: 6 July 1893; Port of Spain, Trinidad
- Died: c. 1957; Trinidad
- Batting: Right-handed
- Bowling: Right-arm medium
- Relatives: Cyl St Hill (brother); Edwin St Hill (brother)

International information
- National side: West Indies
- Test debut (cap 10): 23 June 1928 v England
- Last Test: 1 February 1930 v England

Domestic team information
- Years: Team
- 1912–1930: Trinidad

Career statistics
Competition	Test	First-class
Matches	3	43
Runs scored	117	1,928
Batting average	19.50	27.15
100s/50s	0/0	5/7
Top score	38	144
Balls bowled	12	357
Wickets	0	5
Bowling average	–	41.79
5 wickets in innings	–	0
10 wickets in match	–	0
Best bowling	0/–	2/14
Catches/stumpings	1/0	14/–
- Source: CricInfo, 2 December 2010

Wilton H. St Hill (6 July 1893 – c. 1957) was a Trinidadian international cricketer who played in West Indies' first Test match during their inaugural Test tour of England. A right-handed batman who played in a variety of batting positions, he represented Trinidad in first-class cricket between 1912 and 1930 and played in three Test matches in total. Although his Test record was poor, he was highly regarded in Trinidad. In particular, writer C. L. R. James considered St Hill to be among the top batsmen in the world and dedicated a chapter of Beyond a Boundary to him. At the peak of his career, Lord Harris described him as the best batsman in the West Indies.

Establishing an early reputation playing for the Shannon Club in Trinidad, St Hill was selected for Trinidad in 1912 and played in every Inter-Colonial Tournament until 1930. Although he missed selection for the 1923 tour of England, he played for representative West Indian sides in 1926 against the Marylebone Cricket Club (MCC) and scored a century against the tourists for Trinidad. Success in trial matches led to his selection for the 1928 tour of England where he failed badly. In 1930, he hit another century for Trinidad against MCC and was chosen for one final Test, after which he did not play any further first-class cricket.

One of the first successful black batsmen in the West Indies, St Hill was an enigmatic character who refused to compromise his playing style. Towards the end of his career, his aggression while batting, even when out of form, resulted in his dismissal without scoring many runs.

== Early life and career ==
St Hill was born on 6 July 1893 in Port of Spain, Trinidad, and according to C. L. R. James, his family were lower middle-class. He had two brothers who played first-class cricket for Trinidad, Cyl and Edwin; the latter also played Test matches for West Indies. Cricket in Trinidad at the time was divided along racial lines. For cricket clubs on the island, the colour of a player's skin was crucial. St Hill played for Shannon, a club associated with black lower middle-class players such as teachers or clerks. Another club, Maple, was associated with middle-class people but would only accept men with a lighter skin tone. When someone said to St Hill that Maple would welcome a player as good as him, he replied, "Yes, but they wouldn't want my brothers", both of whom were darker skinned. By 1912, St Hill found a job in a department store and remained in this position all his life. By this stage, he had established a good reputation as a batsman and was popular with players and spectators.

== First-class cricketer ==
=== Playing for Trinidad ===
St Hill was chosen to play for Trinidad in 1912 and made his first-class debut against British Guiana in the Inter-Colonial Tournament. Batting at number nine in the batting order, he scored four runs in his only innings and did not bowl in an innings victory by Trinidad. He retained his place in the tournament final against Barbados and after another failure batting at number eight, he was more successful, scoring 59 not out in the second innings from number nine, sharing a last wicket partnership of 67. However, Barbados won the match easily. St Hill's only other matches before the First World War were both against the Marylebone Cricket Club (MCC) in 1913. Now batting at number three, St Hill scored 76 runs in three innings with a top score of 33. There were no inter-colonial matches that season and the First World War suspended first-class competition.

When cricket resumed in February 1920, St Hill was selected in two matches against Barbados as Trinidad travelled to Barbados. Trinidad were heavily defeated in both games. St Hill scored 18 and 41 in the first game opening the batting, and after scoring two runs at number four in the second game, reverted to opening and scored 96, sharing an opening partnership of 140 with C. P. Cumberbatch. The next tournament took place in Trinidad during September 1921, and St Hill scored 104 runs from number three—his maiden first-class century—as Trinidad defeated British Guiana. The final against Barbados was affected by rain and left drawn when Barbados had to catch the boat home; St Hill scored six runs, batting at number three, and 48 batting at number six. In the inter-colonial matches of September 1922, St Hill continued to bat in a variety of positions, batting at numbers three, five and six, as well as opening the batting. However, he scored just 49 runs in four innings. Although Trinidad reached the final, they were once more heavily defeated by Barbados.

C. L. R. James believes that St Hill planned to play professional cricket in England around this point, but his failure in the trial matches meant that he was not selected to tour England with the West Indies team in 1923. (Note: James states that "There were two or three trial matches. He failed in them and they left him out." CricketArchive does not record any matches being played prior to the 1923 tour, first-class or otherwise, by St Hill except the Inter-continental Tournament matches he played in September 1922.) James records how upset St Hill's supporters were by his omission and they believed the West Indian selectors feared a black batsman being successful in England. He also describes St Hill became more single-minded and less willing to moderate his approach after this decision.

When St Hill played in Trinidad's next match in February 1924, he was joined in the team by his brother Edwin, who took six wickets on his first-class debut. St Hill was less successful, batting at number five and scoring 6 and 23, but Trinidad once again defeated British Guiana to reach the final against Barbados. In the final, he was promoted to open the batting but did not reach double figures in either innings and a century from George Challenor helped Barbados to win the tournament once again; by this point, they had won all but one of the matches played against Trinidad in the years St Hill was in the team. St Hill played in a non-first-class match against the Windward Islands later that year, scoring a fifty in the second innings.

=== Best batsman in the West Indies ===
Playing at home in the Inter-Colonial Tournament, Trinidad once again defeated British Guiana in February 1925 and St Hill opened the batting to score 13 and 29. Playing Barbados in the final, Trinidad won a very close match by 13 runs. St Hill, batting at number three, scored 66 and 64, having not scored a first-class fifty since 1921. As winners of the competition, Trinidad qualified for the final without playing another team in October 1925; British Guiana defeated Barbados but lost in the final. St Hill, remaining at number three, scored 100 in the first innings, but was dismissed for a duck in the second as Trinidad gained a narrow victory by two wickets.

The following January, the MCC toured West Indies. The tourists played matches against a representative West Indian side for which St Hill was selected. In the first match in Barbados, he scored just one run in his only innings batting at number four and the home side just managed to secure a draw. The MCC then played two games against Trinidad both of which were drawn. St Hill batted at number three in both matches. In the first, St Hill scored 45 but in the second he scored 20 and a two-and-a-half hour 105. Lord Harris, having seen this innings, described St Hill as the best batsman in the West Indies. In the remaining two representative matches, St Hill scored 32, 36 and 72 batting at three or five. In the three representative games, St Hill scored 141 runs at an average of 35.25, but the MCC won the series 1–0.

As defending champions, Trinidad again qualified for the final of the Inter-Colonial Tournament in January 1927 and faced Barbados, the home team on this occasion. In a high-scoring match which lasted for eight days, Barbados recovered from being 384 runs behind after the first innings. St Hill contributed a first innings duck and a score of 18 in the second innings, batting down the order. Later in the year, St Hill took part in the trial matches for the 1928 tour of England. Playing for British Guiana and Trinidad against Barbados and Jamaica, he scored 144, the highest innings of his career. St Hill was particularly severe on the bowling of George Francis, a bowler who had represented West Indies. In the other matches, scores of 45, 44 and 71, secured his place in the touring team.

=== Failure in England ===
Expectations for St Hill were high before the tour and Lord Harris predicted St Hill would be a success in England. In a preview of the 1928 English cricket season, The Times commented that the West Indies team was an unknown quantity but singled out St Hill as one of two promising batsmen on the team. The same newspaper later noted his exciting batting style, and described him as "one of the best batsmen on the side, from whom much is expected later on". However, all the touring batsmen were hampered by a cold, wet summer and humid conditions which helped the ball to move through the air. Furthermore, they had to deal with pitches on which the ball spun further and travelled slower after bouncing than they were accustomed to in the Caribbean. St Hill would not or could not adapt his usual attacking style to the unfamiliar conditions. According to James, he was "a horrible, a disastrous, an incredible failure". Making a succession of low scores, he passed fifty only once in first-class games, against Oxford University and scored one century in a minor match against Durham. He played 35 innings in total and reached double figures only 15 times, while in first-class matches he reached double figures just eight times in 25 innings. Despite his poor form, St Hill played in the first two Test matches, making 4 and 9 during West Indies inaugural Test, batting at number five and scoring 3 and 38 in the second Test, batting at number four. West Indies lost both games and lost their first Test series 3–0. After the end of July, St Hill only played once more on the tour. In total, he scored 262 first-class runs at an average of 10.91. Wisden Cricketers' Almanack described St Hill as the "big disappointment" of the tour, noting that he tried to attack the bowling too early in his innings and therefore rarely succeeded. Nevertheless, the correspondent commented on his range of shots on the off side.

=== End of career ===
Following St Hill's return to the West Indies, the Inter-Colonial Tournament took place in Trinidad during January and February 1929. The home team defeated British Guiana before beating Barbados by an innings in the final. St Hill batted at number three throughout but managed scores of just 4, 23 and 5. However, Trinidad could not defend their title in October as British Guiana defeated the team by four wickets. St Hill batted at number seven in the first innings and three in the second innings but made just 11 runs in the match.

The MCC toured once again in early 1930, where the team played two games against Trinidad, although St Hill only appeared in the first. Again batting at number three, he scored 16 in the first innings but accumulated 102 in the second—his final first-class century. Concentrating on defence, St Hill batted for four hours showing more patience than he had done before. James wrote that "the eagle had clipped his own wings at last". St Hill was selected for the Test on his home ground in Trinidad and had his best match statistically. Batting at number three in the first innings, he scored 30 and opened the batting to score 33 in the second innings. Wisden described him as batting steadily, but West Indies lost the match and St Hill did not play any further Test or first-class cricket. In three Tests, he scored 117 runs at an average of 19.50 and in 43 first-class games, he hit 1928 runs at 27.15 with five centuries. He also took five wickets.

By 1931, St Hill remained successful in local Trinidad cricket, but one newspaper report suggested that he had "fallen off considerably" in terms of form, and was unlikely to play for West Indies again. Very little is known about the remainder of his life. There are no details about his death, although he is believed to have died around 1957. When former West Indian cricketer Learie Constantine wrote about him in 1957, he noted that St Hill was dead. In 1984, he was entered into the Trinidad and Tobago Sports Hall of Fame.

== Personality, style and technique ==
C. L. R. James described St Hill as "about six feet or a little under, slim, wiry, with forearms like whipcord. His face was bony, with small sharp eyes and a thin, tight mouth." A reserved man, Hill kept his opinions to himself. Off the cricket field, James described him as partial to the "good things of life".

St Hill was one of the first successful black batsmen in West Indies. As a batsman, St Hill's performances reached their highest standards on the biggest occasions and against the best bowlers. Although not possessing quick footwork, he was capable of quickly judging where the ball would land. This enabled him to get into position quickly gave him extra time to play shots, which he often delayed until the ball was very close to him. Many of his runs were hit behind point and square leg. St Hill's favourite stroke was the leg glance; the shot carried the risk of falling leg before wicket (lbw) if he missed but his placement was very precise. He also played a range of cut shots. If a bowler restricted his scoring, St Hill improvised attacking shots to break free. Learie Constantine wrote a description of an innings he saw St Hill play as a young man. Facing the fast bowling of George John, St Hill "flicked his wrists and the ball flew to the boundary faster than sound. The next went the same way. The boy batted from his wrists; he never seemed to use any force. I don't believe he had the strength even if he so desired. His was just perfect timing." However, he always insisted on playing his own style of game, whether he was in form or not. The result was often his dismissal without scoring many runs. This was the case in England in 1928. After 1926, St Hill was never the same batsman and according to James was as likely to get out cheaply as he was to make a big score.

St Hill possessed a presence which compelled attention when he was batting. James wrote: "Fires burned in St Hill and you could always see them glow." When playing for Shannon, he insisted on the highest standards, and even though he was not captain, he would take over if the game was going against his team. James also wrote that he never understood St Hill as he did others: "His eyes used to blaze when he was discussing a point with you; but even within his clipped sentences there were intervals when he seemed to be thinking of other things, far removed."

St Hill's batting success was significant for many in cricket. Writer Grant Farred observed: "In St Hill the masses that watched the game ... saw a vision created in which anger and resentment at the 'pervading humiliation' they suffered was distilled into a finely tuned batsman." At the time, black Trinidadians had no democratic outlet for their feelings and opinions. Fared writes that St Hill's batting "represented a victory over the forces that held sway over this community's life in all other walks of life". St Hill's many followers in Trinidad identified with his successes and his ability to compete with equality on the cricket field as a sign that they successfully take part in other aspects of life which had been closed to them.

== Beyond a Boundary ==
St. Hill is the subject of a chapter in Beyond a Boundary by C. L. R. James, published in 1963. The book is regarded by many critics as the greatest book on cricket and one of the best books on sport. James wrote: "In my gallery, [St Hill] is present with Bradman, Sobers, George Headley and the three Ws, Hutton and Compton, Peter May and a few others." He describes his character and play, and writes about how much St Hill's success meant to black Trinidadians as he was "one of us, performing in excelsis in a sphere where competition was open ... Wilton St Hill was our boy." Reviewing the book in Wisden in 1964, John Arlott wrote: "The essay on Wilton St Hill must be the finest portrait of a cricketer ever created in prose—or, for that matter in verse or paint either".

James concluded the chapter: "He saw the ball as early as anyone. He played it as late as anyone. His spirit was untameable, perhaps too much so. There we must leave it."

== Bibliography ==
- Farred, Grant (2003). What's my name?: Black vernacular intellectuals. Minneapolis: University of Minnesota Press. ISBN 978-0-8166-3317-3.
- James, C. L. R. (1983) [1963]. Beyond a Boundary. London: Serpent's Tail. ISBN 1-85242-358-7.
- Lawrence, Bridgette; Goble, Ray (1991). The Complete Record of West Indian Test Cricketers. Leicester: ACL and Polar Publishing (UK) Ltd. ISBN 0-9514862-2-5.
- Manley, Michael (1995) [1988]. A History of West Indies Cricket. London: Andre Deutsch. ISBN 0-233-98937-4.
