= Beyond a Boundary =

1963 memoir on cricket by C. L. R. James

- 2005 reprint cover
- Author: C. L. R. James
- Language: English
- Publisher: Hutchinson (1963)
- Publication date: 1963, 2005 (US 1982, 1993)
- Publication place: Trinidad / United Kingdom
- ISBN: 978-0-224-07427-8
- OCLC: 58998824
- LC Class: GV917 .J27 2005
- Preceded by: Party Politics in the West Indies (1962)
- Followed by: A History of Pan-African Revolt (1969)

Beyond a Boundary (1963) is a memoir on cricket written by the Trinidadian journalist, Marxist intellectual and activist C. L. R. James, which he described as "neither cricket reminiscences nor autobiography". It mixes social commentary, particularly on the place of cricket in the West Indies and England, with commentary on the game, arguing that what happened inside the "boundary line" in cricket affected life beyond it, as well as the converse.

The book is in a sense a response to a quote from Rudyard Kipling's poem "The English Flag": "What should they know of England who only England know?", which James in his Preface revised to: "What do they know of cricket who only cricket know?"

== Content ==
James recounts the role cricket played in his family's history, and his meetings with such early West Indian players as George John, Wilton St Hill, the great batsman George Headley and the all-rounder Learie Constantine, but focuses on the importance of the game and its players to society, specifically to colonial era Trinidad. James argues for the importance of sport in history, and refers to its roots in the Olympic Games of Ancient Greece. He documents the primacy of W. G. Grace in the development of modern cricket, and the values embraced by cricket in the development of the cultures of the British Empire. He approaches cricket as an art form, as well as discussing its political impact – particularly the role of race and class in early West Indian cricket. "Cricket", he writes, "had plunged me into politics long before I was aware of it. When I did turn to politics, I did not have too much to learn." Cricket is approached as a method of examining the formation of national culture, society in the West Indies, the United Kingdom, and Trinidad. Education, family, national culture, class, race, colonialism, and the process of decolonisation are all examined through the prism of contemporary West Indian cricket, the history of cricket, and James's life as a player of—and commentator and writer on—the sport of cricket.

James was born and educated in Port of Spain, Trinidad. He recounts the importance of cricket to himself and his community, the role it played in his education, and the disapproval from his family of his attempt to follow a sporting life along with his academic career, whom he describes as "Puritan". This too, he relates to cricket. James returns to the values imbued with cricket, first into the 19th-century English bourgeois culture of the British public school, and then out into the colonies. He contrasts this with American culture, his own growing radicalism, and the fact that the values of fair play and acceptance of arbitration without complaint rarely apply in the world beyond the cricket pitch.

After graduating from Queen's Royal College high school, he played first-class cricket for a year in the Trinidad league. Having to choose from clubs divided by class, race and skin-tone, James writes of his recruitment as a dark-skinned high-school-educated player to Maple, a club of the light-skinned lower middle class. He writes, in a chapter entitled "The Light and the Dark": "...faced with the fundamental divisions in the island, I had gone to the right and, by cutting myself off from the popular side, delayed my political development for years."

In 1932, James travelled to Britain to join Learie Constantine (a much more successful cricketer, who played as a professional in the Lancashire League), and was able to earn a living as cricket correspondent of the Manchester Guardian, also helping Constantine to write his memoir Cricket and I (1933). James recounts the lessons he learned from cricket about race and class in Britain, and the perspective that cricket gave him on the independence struggle in Trinidad, and the short-lived West Indies Federation, which he witnessed after his return in 1958. An advocate of Pan-Africanism, James examines the relationships of the unified West Indies cricket team through independence, nationalism of particular islands, and in interaction with other colonial and post-colonial national teams (such as West Indian tours of Australia and England).

== Reputation and legacy ==
James initially had difficulty finding a publisher for the book, according to his widow Selma James, but on its publication by Hutchinson Beyond a Boundary was well received, and John Arlott wrote in Wisden:

"1963 has been marked by the publication of a cricket book so outstanding as to compel any reviewer to check his adjectives several times before he describes it and, since he is likely to be dealing in superlatives, to measure them carefully to avoid over-praise – which this book does not need … in the opinion of the reviewer, it is the finest book written about the game of cricket."

The book is widely recognised as one of the best and most important books on cricket. V. S. Naipaul wrote that it was "one of the finest and most finished books to come out of the West Indies." In 2005, The Observer ranked the book as the third best book on sport ever written, and Nicholas Lezard reviewing an earlier re-issue for The Guardian wrote: "To say 'the best cricket book ever written' is pifflingly inadequate praise." Another appraisal of the book (by historian Dave Renton, who calls it "by common consent, the greatest book about cricket ever written") observes: "The genius of Beyond a Boundary lies in its strong literary quality: almost unique among those who write about sport James had a theory of cricket, one that took in history and politics as well as memoir."

In 1976, Mike Dibb made a film about C. L. R. James entitled Beyond a Boundary for the BBC television series Omnibus.

In August 1996, BBC Radio 4 broadcast a five-part abridgement by Margaret Busby of Beyond a Boundary, read by Trevor McDonald, and produced by Pam Fraser Solomon.

A conference at the University of Glasgow to mark the 50th anniversary of the book's first publication took place in May 2013. Some of the proceedings of this conference, including contributions from Selma James and Mike Brearley together with other contributions such as those from Hilary Beckles, have been edited for publication in the first edited collection solely to be devoted to the study of James's work, Marxism, Colonialism and Cricket: C.L.R. James's Beyond a Boundary, published in 2018 by Duke University Press. This volume includes a previously unpublished first draft of Beyond a Boundary's conclusion.

== Editions ==
- 1963 – London: Stanley Paul/Hutchinson
- 1964 – The Sportsman's Bookclub
- 1983 – London: Serpent's Tail
- 1984 – New York: Pantheon Books
- 1993 – Durham, NC: Duke University Press (with introduction by Robert Lipsyte)
- 2005 – Yellow Jersey Press
- 2013 – Durham, NC: Duke University Press reprint (50th Anniversary edition), with new foreword by Paget Henry

== Other cricket writings by James ==
For his non-cricket writing, see main entry for C. L. R. James

- Learie Constantine (with C. L. R. James), Cricket and I (1933).
- C. L. R. James, A Majestic Innings: Writings on Cricket. Aurum Press (2006). ISBN 1-84513-179-7

== See also ==
- History of cricket in the West Indies from 1918–19 to 1945
- English cricket team in West Indies in 1934–35
- History of Trinidad and Tobago
