= From A to X =

First edition

From A to X is a novel written by John Berger, published by Verso Books in 2008. It is a story about love, being suppressed by an authoritative totalitarianism in a fictional country. Features from military setting are included, as well as medical and pharmaceutical terms, since the two main characters are Xavier, who has been imprisoned and given two life sentences, and A'ida, a young pharmacist and Xavier's lover.

== Composition and story ==
The novel is set in the fictional town of Suse in an unknown country. The novel is a collection of letters sent by A'ida, the main protagonist, to her lover Xavier who is imprisoned as a political prisoner. The letters describe the everyday life of A'ida as well as the lives of her friends and acquaintances. The letters also describe A'ida's, and the other townspeople's, struggle against oppression from an unnamed invading military force. Many of the stories told by A'ida deal with oppression and violence inflicted by this regime such as describing missile strikes or discussing her friend, whose husband was kidnapped and executed. The letters also tell of A'ida and her fellow citizens' resistance to oppression of the regime, such as forming a human chain to prevent soldiers from reaching a hiding dissident. On the other side of most sheets, as well as in the margins of the letters, are Xavier's notes, not received by A'ida, explaining his reactions to the events described in the letters and his political opinions. Some of Xavier's notes also describe life in prison.

== Reception ==
The novel was long listed for the Booker Prize. In a positive review in The New York Times, writer Leah Hager Cohen praises the novel's unconventional narrative. With the letters sent from A'ida to Xavier being suggested as not being in chronological order, with their contents possibly written in code and with certain parts of the letters being illegible; Cohen states that "Berger the author invites us to interact with, to co-create, the text, guessing at the meanings of words and phrases, pondering what might have happened in the interval between letters, and imagining the reasons some were never posted. But “invites” is too mild a term, and “co-create” too academic. What he really does is charge the reader with the responsibility to join in." Cohen also praises Berger's ability to condemn the blind sweep of oppression, while also keeping the novel firmly rooted in human emotion, human longing between the two protagonists. Writing for The Independent, Melissa Benn lauded Berger for upending the conventional assumptions on the causes of conflict; with the antagonists being the defensive and aggressive stance of the globally powerful and the protagonists (A'ida and Xavier) being those who resist and oppose injustice (a common theme in Berger's novels per Benn). But Benn found the letter form of the book as constraining and preventing narrative drive. Benn also criticized a lack of character development; stating: "Without this, it's hard to care for, rather than simply admire, strong and suffering A'ida". Writing for The Guardian, writer Tadzio Koelb praised the letters as "poetic declarations of love" stating that "what could have easily become a political tract is thereby personalized". Koelb applauded Berger for this poetic nature of the letters while noting that the letters were also able to depict the more immediate and political nature of the plot.
