= To the Wedding =

1995 novel by John Berger

- First edition (publ. Bloomsbury)
- Author: John Berger
- Language: English
- Publication date: 1995

To the Wedding is a 1995 novel by the British author John Berger about lovers Gino and Ninon who are getting married and how they, and the people around them, manage to overcome death and fate and create meaning in their lives.

== Plot summary ==
The story begins as a narrative within a narrative from the point of view of a blind tamata peddler, who first encounters Ninon's father when he wants to buy a tamata for his daughter, Ninon, who is suffering 'everywhere'. The novel abruptly shifts its perspective to Ninon's story. Ninon, a young woman in her 20s, meets a man working at a restaurant who catches her fancy. She eventually allows herself to be seduced and they end up making love the same day. They part, and she visits the restaurant again the following day only to hear from the chef that the man was an escaped convict and had been arrested by the police. The narrative is splintered to include the journey of Ninon's father and mother to her wedding. Ninon travels around Europe and, on a visit to a museum, encounters Gino. They become devoted lovers, and in one memorable occasion break open a shack with their love-making. During the course of their relationship, Ninon notices sores on her lips and decides to see a doctor when they do not heal. To her shock, the doctor tells her that she has AIDS. She realizes that the man at the restaurant was the one who gave the disease to her and feels bitter and angry. She breaks off communication with Gino who is frantic to speak with her. Eventually, she explains to Gino that she has AIDS, expecting rebuke and disgust, but to her surprise, Gino proposes marriage. The lovers manage to create meaning in their lives in the face of approaching death.

== Themes ==
The novel is a strongly existential novel, responding to the void of meaninglessness and futility presented in the novel Heart of Darkness. The characters are not consumed, but manage to oppose the darkness of an amoral and uncaring world by finding meaning in the tasks they do. They must take up these tasks to avoid the existential darkness. Despite its dark subject matter, the tone is one of hope and triumph by the end of the book.

The landscape imagery of the novel is consistently one of a wasteland. Jean Ferrero, Ninon's father, travels on his motorbike through vast landscapes and impenetrable darkness. As he nears his ultimate destination, his daughter's wedding, the landscape becomes steadily more bleak. This symbolizes that he is getting closer and closer to a void. However, even at the uttermost edge of the void, at the end of the novel, all the characters manage to find meaning.

== Thematic significance of secondary characters ==
- The Blind Man: He understands the meaning behind small actions. He is able to live a full life despite the inaccessibility of the world around him.
- Jean: He is able to overcome his own personal demons through coming to terms with his daughter's inevitable death through the wedding ceremony and the journey to the wedding.
- Zdena: She assigns meaning to the smallest of actions, such as sleeping on her daughter's bed. She repeatedly organizes the contents of her handbag before going to the wedding. This is her 'task', establishing order in her handbag.
- Bird Call Makers: They attribute meaning to the bird call devices they sell. Zdena gives the devices to her daughter to create meaning in her life.
- Tomas: He takes on small tasks such as taxi driving and postcards. He instantly forges a deep friendship with Zdena, and even though they know they must part in a short while, they both savor the time they have together while it lasts.
