= Penguin Great Ideas =

Book series published by Penguin

Cover of book #9 in the Great Ideas Series.

Penguin Great Ideas is a series of largely non-fiction books published by Penguin Books. Titles contained within this series are considered to be world-changing, influential and inspirational. Topics covered include philosophy, politics, science and war. The texts for the series have been extracted from previously published Penguin Classics and Penguin Modern Classics titles and purged of all editorial apparatus, making them appear as standalone texts. The concept of repurposed extracts was inspired by an earlier Penguin series produced in the mid-1990s, the Penguin's 60 Classics, which were extracts of classic texts published in a small book format at the time of Penguin's 60th anniversary. The typographic cover designs of the series have been highly praised, winning prizes such as a D&AD award in 2005.

The overall series is divided into six series of twenty books, each about one hundred and twenty pages long. Most books contain a notable essay, often by a very well known writer. Some of these are slightly shortened. The third series features additional works by the previous series' most popular writers: Albert Camus, Sigmund Freud, Søren Kierkegaard, Friedrich Nietzsche, George Orwell and John Ruskin. The fourth series includes a third essay by Orwell, and additional works by Michel de Montaigne, Arthur Schopenhauer, Karl Marx and Virginia Woolf. The fifth series was announced as the last in 2010, but after a decade long hiatus a new sixth series was set for release on 24 September 2020. Series six is notable for including a more diverse group of authors.

The mission statement of series one to five was: "GREAT IDEAS. Throughout history, some books have changed the world. They have transformed the way we see ourselves - and each other. They have inspired debate, dissent, war and revolution. They have enlightened, outraged, provoked and comforted. They have enriched lives - and destroyed them. Now Penguin brings you the works of the great thinkers, pioneers, radicals and visionaries whose ideas shook civilization and helped make us who we are."

The mission statement of series six is: "One of twenty new books in the bestselling Penguin Great Ideas series. This new selection showcases a diverse list of thinkers who have helped shape our world today, from anarchists to stoics, feminists to prophets, satirists to Zen Buddhists."

== Books ==
=== Series One (2004) ===
All books in this series, published 9 February 2004, have red spines.

01. On the Shortness of Life - Seneca
02. Meditations - Marcus Aurelius
03. Confessions - Augustine
04. The Inner Life - Thomas à Kempis
05. The Prince - Niccolò Machiavelli
06. On Friendship - Michel de Montaigne
07. A Tale of a Tub - Jonathan Swift
08. The Social Contract - Jean-Jacques Rousseau
09. The Christians and the Fall of Rome - Edward Gibbon
10. Common Sense - Thomas Paine
11. A Vindication of the Rights of Woman - Mary Wollstonecraft
12. On the Pleasure of Hating - William Hazlitt
13. The Communist Manifesto - Karl Marx and Friedrich Engels
14. On the Suffering of the World - Arthur Schopenhauer
15. On Art and Life - John Ruskin
16. On Natural Selection - Charles Darwin
17. Why I Am So Wise - Friedrich Nietzsche
18. A Room of One's Own - Virginia Woolf
19. Civilization and Its Discontents - Sigmund Freud
20. Why I Write - George Orwell

=== Series Two (2005) ===
All books in this series, published 25 August 2005, have blue spines.

21. The First Ten Books - Confucius
22. The Art of War - Sun Tzu
23. The Symposium - Plato
24. Sensation and Sex - Lucretius
25. An Attack on the Enemy of Freedom - Cicero
26. The Revelation of St John the Divine and The Book of Job
27. Travels in the Land of Kublai Khan - Marco Polo
28. The City of Ladies - Christine de Pizan
29. How to Achieve True Greatness - Baldesar Castiglione
30. Of Empire - Francis Bacon
31. Of Man - Thomas Hobbes
32. Urne-Burial - Sir Thomas Browne
33. Miracles and Idolatry - Voltaire
34. On Suicide - David Hume
35. On the Nature of War - Carl von Clausewitz
36. Fear and Trembling - Søren Kierkegaard
37. Where I Lived, and What I Lived For - Henry David Thoreau
38. Conspicuous Consumption - Thorstein Veblen
39. The Myth of Sisyphus - Albert Camus
40. Eichmann and the Holocaust - Hannah Arendt

=== Series Three (2008) ===
All books in this series, published 7 August 2008, have green spines.

41. In Consolation to his Wife - Plutarch
42. Some Anatomies of Melancholy - Robert Burton
43. Human Happiness - Blaise Pascal
44. The Invisible Hand - Adam Smith
45. The Evils of Revolution - Edmund Burke
46. Nature - Ralph Waldo Emerson
47. The Sickness Unto Death - Søren Kierkegaard
48. The Lamp of Memory - John Ruskin
49. Man Alone with Himself - Friedrich Nietzsche
50. A Confession - Leo Tolstoy
51. Useful Work versus Useless Toil - William Morris
52. The Significance of the Frontier in American History - Frederick Jackson Turner
53. Days of Reading - Marcel Proust
54. An Appeal to the Toiling, Oppressed and Exhausted Peoples of Europe - Leon Trotsky
55. The Future of an Illusion - Sigmund Freud
56. The Work of Art in the Age of Mechanical Reproduction - Walter Benjamin
57. Books v. Cigarettes - George Orwell
58. The Fastidious Assassins - Albert Camus
59. Concerning Violence - Frantz Fanon
60. The Spectacle of the Scaffold - Michel Foucault

=== Series Four (2009) ===
All books in this series, published 27 August 2009, have purple spines.

61. Tao Te Ching - Lao-Tzu
62. Writings from the Zen Masters - Various
63. Utopia - Thomas More
64. On Solitude - Michel de Montaigne
65. On Power - William Shakespeare
66. Of the Abuse of Words - John Locke
67. Consolation in the Face of Death - Samuel Johnson
68. An Answer to the Question: What Is Enlightenment? - Immanuel Kant
69. The Executioner - Joseph de Maistre
70. Confessions of an English Opium-Eater - Thomas de Quincey
71. The Horrors and Absurdities of Religion - Arthur Schopenhauer
72. The Gettysburg Address - Abraham Lincoln
73. Revolution and War - Karl Marx
74. The Grand Inquisitor - Fyodor Dostoyevsky
75. On A Certain Blindness in Human Beings - William James
76. An Apology for Idlers - Robert Louis Stevenson
77. Of the Dawn of Freedom - W. E. B. Du Bois
78. Thoughts of Peace in an Air Raid - Virginia Woolf
79. Decline of the English Murder - George Orwell
80. Why Look at Animals? - John Berger

=== Series Five (2010) ===
All books in this series, published 26 August 2010, have orange spines.

81. The Tao of Nature - Chuang Tzu
82. Of Human Freedom - Epictetus
83. On Conspiracies - Niccolò Machiavelli
84. Meditations - René Descartes
85. Dialogue Between Fashion and Death - Giacomo Leopardi
86. On Liberty - John Stuart Mill
87. Hosts of Living Forms - Charles Darwin
88. Night Walks - Charles Dickens
89. Some Extraordinary Popular Delusions - Charles Mackay
90. The State as a Work of Art - Jacob Burckhardt
91. Silly Novels by Lady Novelists - George Eliot
92. The Painter of Modern Life - Charles Baudelaire
93. The 'Wolfman' - Sigmund Freud
94. The Jewish State - Theodor Herzl
95. Nationalism - Rabindranath Tagore
96. Imperialism: The Highest Stage of Capitalism - Vladimir Ilyich Lenin
97. We Will All Go Down Fighting to the End - Winston Churchill
98. The Perpetual Race of Achilles and the Tortoise - Jorge Luis Borges
99. Some Thoughts on the Common Toad - George Orwell
100. An Image of Africa - Chinua Achebe

=== Series Six (2020) ===
All books in this series, published 24 September 2020, have teal spines.

101. One Swallow Does Not Make a Summer - Aristotle
102. Being Happy - Epicurus
103. How To Be a Stoic - Marcus Aurelius, Seneca and Epictetus
104. Three Japanese Buddhist Monks - Yoshida Kenkō, Kamo no Chōmei and Saigyō Hōshi
105. Ain't I A Woman? - Sojourner Truth
106. Anarchist Communism - Peter Kropotkin
107. God is Dead - Friedrich Nietzsche
108. The Decay of Lying - Oscar Wilde
109. Suffragette Manifestos - Various
110. Bushido: The Soul of Japan - Inazo Nitobe
111. The Freedom to Be Free - Hannah Arendt
112. What Is Existentialism? - Simone de Beauvoir
113. The Power of Words - Simone Weil
114. Reflections on the Guillotine - Albert Camus
115. The Narrative of Trajan's Column - Italo Calvino
116. A Tough Mind and a Tender Heart - Martin Luther King Jr.
117. Steps Towards a Small Theory of the Visible - John Berger
118. When I Dare to Be Powerful - Audre Lorde
119. Brief Notes on the Art and Manner of Arranging One's Books - Georges Perec
120. Why Vegan? - Peter Singer
