= John Berger =

English painter, critic and writer (1926–2017)

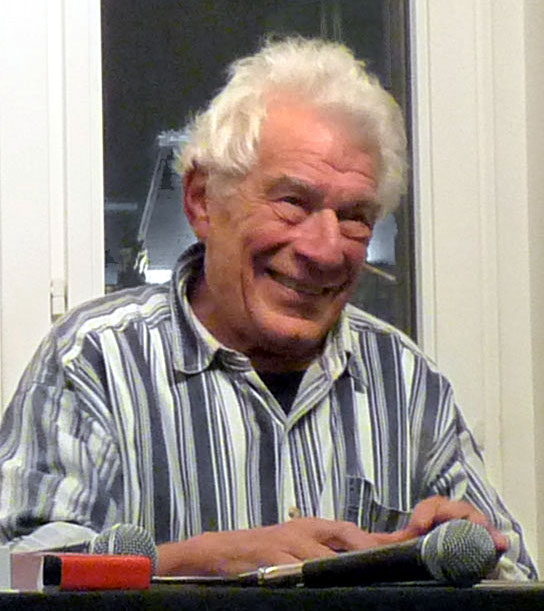
- Berger in 2009
- Born: John Peter Berger; 5 November 1926; London, England
- Died: 2 January 2017 (aged 90); Antony, Hauts-de-Seine, France
- Education: St Edward's School, Oxford; Chelsea School of Art; Central School of Art and Design
- Occupations: Novelist; critic; painter; poet
- Children: 3, including Jacob
- Writing career
- Language: English
- Genres: Novels; poetry
- Notable awards: James Tait Black Memorial Prize; Booker Prize (1972); Golden PEN Award (2009)

John Peter Berger (/ˈbɜːrdʒər/ BUR-jər; 5 November 1926 – 2 January 2017) was an English art critic, novelist, painter and poet. His novel G. won the 1972 Booker Prize. His essay on art criticism Ways of Seeing, written as an accompaniment to the BBC series of the same name, is hugely culturally influential and continues to be widely read today. He lived in France for more than fifty years.

== Early life ==
Berger was born on 5 November 1926 in Stoke Newington, London, the first of two children of Miriam and Stanley Berger.

His grandfather was from Trieste, now Italy, and his father, Stanley, raised as a non-religious Jew who adopted Catholicism, had been an infantry officer on the Western Front during the First World War and was awarded the Military Cross and an OBE.

Berger was educated at St Edward's School, Oxford. He served in the British Army during the Second World War from 1944 to 1946. He enrolled at the Chelsea School of Art and the Central School of Art and Design in London.

== Early career ==
Berger began his career as a painter and exhibited works at a number of London galleries in the late 1940s. His art has been shown at the Wildenstein, Redfern and Leicester Galleries in London.

Berger taught drawing at St Mary's teacher training college. He later became an art critic, publishing many essays and reviews in the New Statesman. His Marxist literary criticism and strongly stated opinions on modern art combined to make him a controversial figure early in his career. As a statement of political commitment, he titled an early collection of essays Permanent Red.

Berger was never a formal member of the Communist Party of Great Britain (CPGB): rather he was a close associate of it and its front, the Artists' International Association (AIA), until the latter disappeared in 1953. He was active in the Geneva Club, a discussion group that overlapped with British communist circles in the 1950s.

== Published work ==
In 1958, Berger published his first novel, A Painter of Our Time, which tells the story of the disappearance of Janos Lavin, a fictional exiled Hungarian painter, and his diary's discovery by an art critic friend called John. The work was withdrawn by the publisher under pressure from the Congress for Cultural Freedom a month after its publication. His next novels were The Foot of Clive and Corker's Freedom; both of which presented an urban English life of alienation and melancholy. Berger moved to Quincy in Mieussy in Haute-Savoie, France, in 1962 due to his distaste for life in Britain.

In 1972, the BBC broadcast his four-part television series Ways of Seeing and published its accompanying text, a book of the same name. The first episode functions as an introduction to the study of images; it was derived in part from Walter Benjamin's essay "The Work of Art in the Age of Mechanical Reproduction". The subsequent episodes concern the image of woman as a sexualized object in Western culture, expressions of property ownership and wealth in European oil painting, and modern advertising. The series, the first of several close collaborations with director Mike Dibb, has had a lasting influence, and in particular introduced the concept of the male gaze, as part of his analysis of the treatment of the nude in European painting. It soon became popular among feminists, including the British film critic Laura Mulvey, who used it to critique traditional media representations of the female character in cinema.

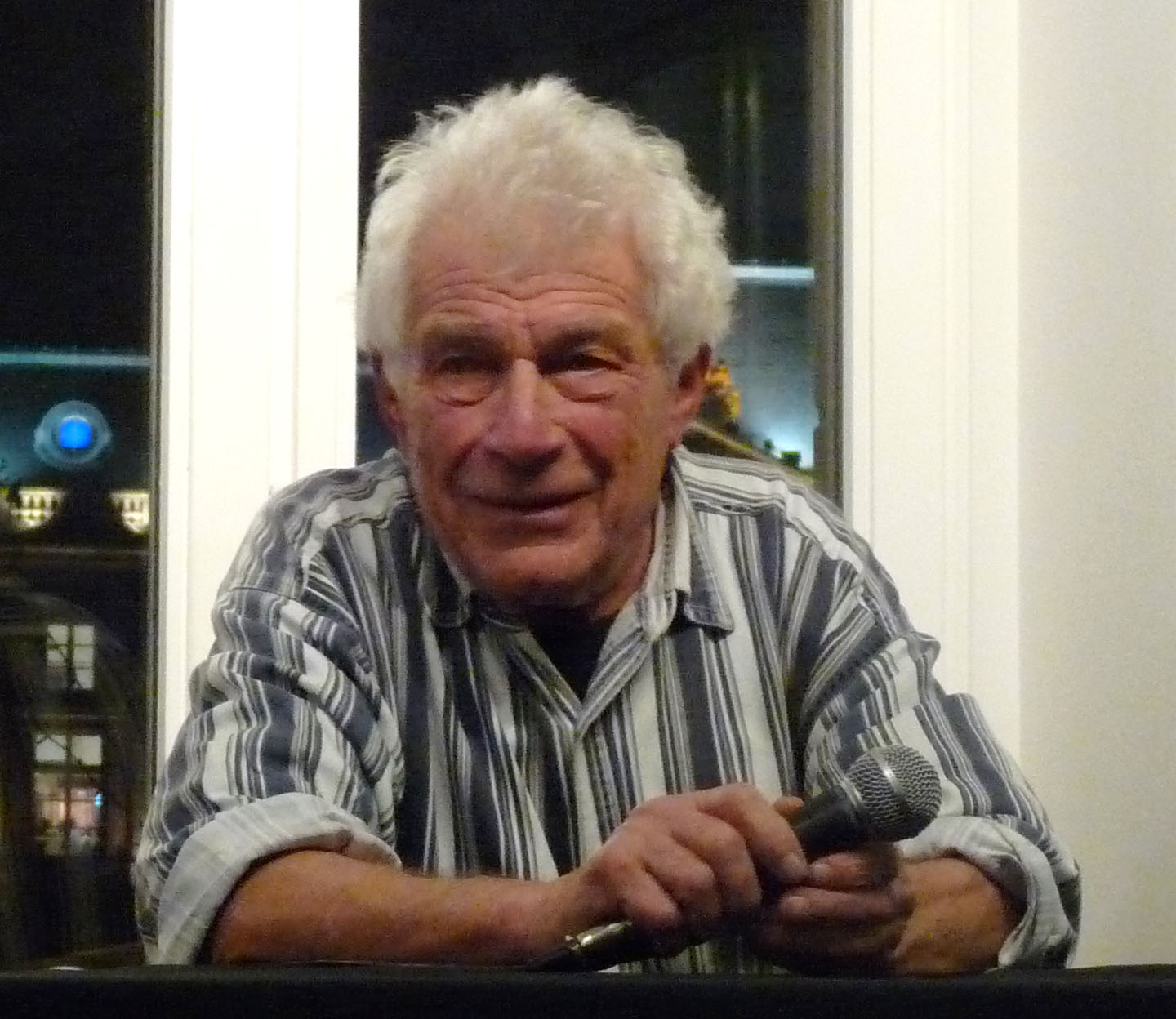
Berger in 2009

Berger's novel G., a picaresque romance set in Europe in 1898, won the James Tait Black Memorial Prize and the Booker Prize in 1972. Berger donated half the Booker cash prize to the British Black Panthers, and retained the other half to support his work on the study on migrant workers, which became A Seventh Man; he asserted that both endeavours represented aspects of his political struggle. In his acceptance speech at the Booker Prize ceremony, Berger said the prize's sponsor, Booker McConnell, had a long history of slavery and exploitation in the Caribbean, and this was why he wanted to donate the money to the British Black Panthers and fund the writing of his book on migrant workers.

Berger's sociological writings include A Fortunate Man: The Story of a Country Doctor (1967) and A Seventh Man: Migrant Workers in Europe (1975).

Berger and photographer Jean Mohr, his frequent collaborator, sought to document and understand the experiences of peasants.

Their subsequent book, Another Way of Telling, discusses and illustrates their documentary technique and treats the theory of photography through Berger's essays and Mohr's photographs. His studies of individual artists include The Success and Failure of Picasso (1965), a survey of that modernist's career, and Art and Revolution: Ernst Neizvestny, Endurance, and the Role of the Artist in the USSR (1969).

In the 1970s, Berger collaborated on three films with the Swiss director Alain Tanner: He wrote or co-wrote La Salamandre (1971), The Middle of the World (1974), and Jonah Who Will Be 25 in the Year 2000 (1976). His major fictional work of the 1980s, the trilogy Into Their Labours (consisting of the novels Pig Earth, Once in Europa, and Lilac and Flag), treats the European peasant experience from its farming roots to contemporary economic and political displacement and urban poverty. In 1974, Berger co-founded the Writers and Readers Publishing Cooperative Ltd in London with Arnold Wesker, Lisa Appignanesi, Richard Appignanesi, Chris Searle, Glenn Thompson, Siân Williams, and others. The cooperative was active until the early 1980s.

In later essays, Berger wrote about photography, art, politics, and memory. He published in The Shape of a Pocket a correspondence with Subcomandante Marcos, and penned short stories that appeared in The Threepenny Review and The New Yorker. His sole volume of poetry is Pages of the Wound, though other volumes, such as the theoretical essays And Our Faces, My Heart, Brief as Photos, contain poetry. His 2007 collection of essays on the uses of art as an instrument of political resistance, Hold Everything Dear, was titled after the poem by Gareth Evans. Berger's later novels include To the Wedding, a love story dealing with the AIDS crisis, and King: A Street Story, a novel about homelessness and shantytown life told from the perspective of a stray dog. Initially, Berger insisted that his name be kept off the cover and title page of King, wanting the novel to be received on its own merits.

Berger's 1980 volume About Looking includes an influential chapter, "Why Look at Animals?" It is cited by numerous scholars in the interdisciplinary field of animal studies. The chapter was later reproduced in a Penguin Great Ideas selection of essays of the same title.

Berger's novel From A to X was long-listed for the 2008 Booker Prize. In Bento's Sketchbook (2011), Berger combines extracts from Baruch Spinoza, sketches, memoir, and observations in a book that contemplates the relationship of materialism to spirituality. According to Berger, what could be seen as a contradiction "is beautifully resolved by Spinoza, who shows that it is not a duality, but in fact an essential unity". The book has been described as "a characteristically sui generis work combining an engagement with the thought of the 17th-century lens grinder, draughtsman, and philosopher Baruch Spinoza, with a study of drawing and a series of semi-autobiographical sketches". Among Berger's last works is Confabulations (essays, 2016).

== Other work ==
In 1999, Berger voiced twin brothers Archie and Albert Crisp in the video game Grand Theft Auto: London 1969.

He was a member of the Support Committee of the Russell Tribunal on Palestine.

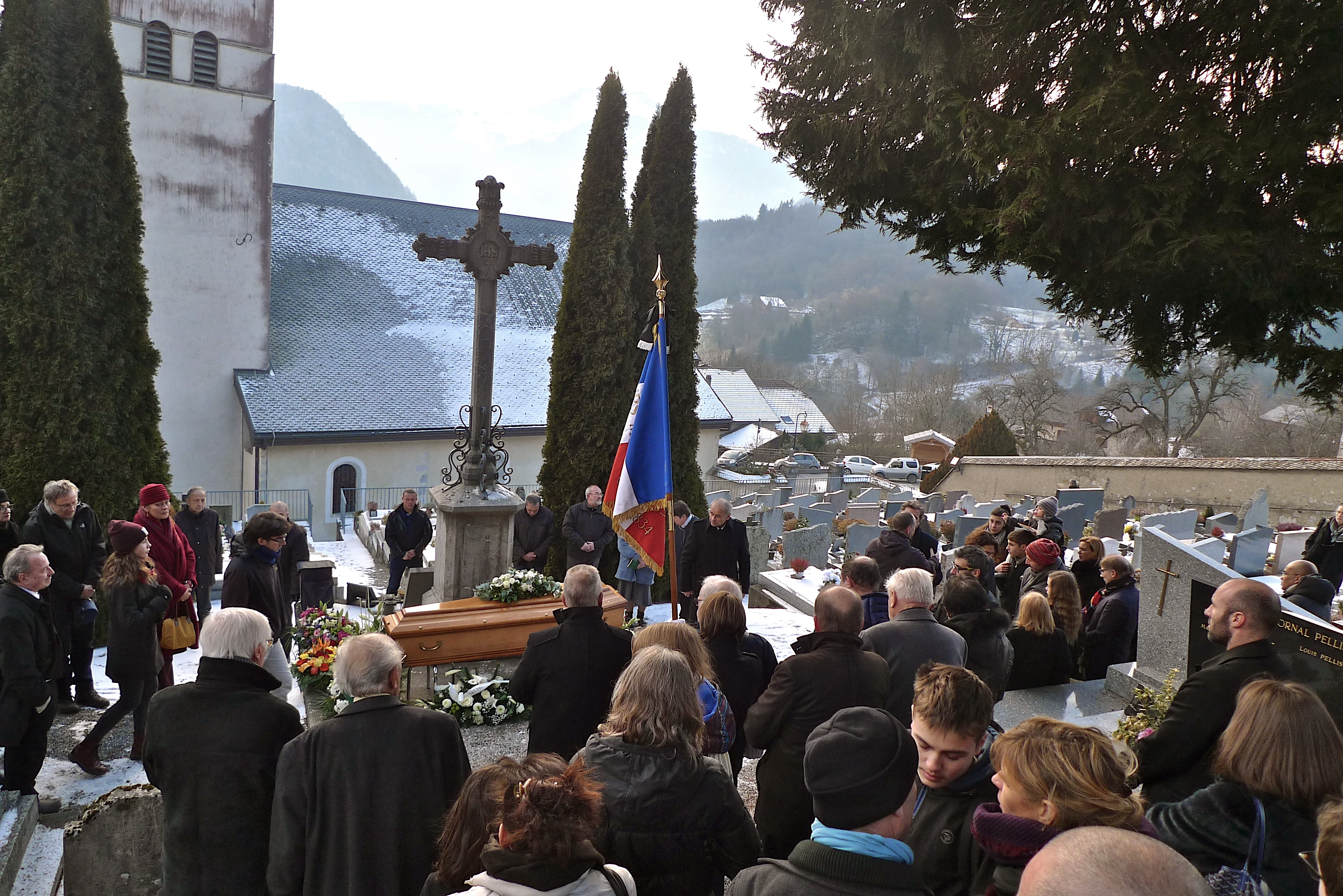
John Berger funeral, Quincy, 7 January 2017. Pic.: Amarjit Chandan

== Personal life ==
Berger married first to artist and illustrator Patricia (Pat) Marriott in 1949. They divorced.

His second wife was the Hon. Rosemary Sibell Guest, ex-wife of Gilbert Boyd, 6th Baron Kilmarnock.

In the mid-1950s, Berger married the Russian translator Anya Bostock, with whom he had two children, Katya Berger and Jacob Berger. The couple divorced in the mid-1970s.

Berger then married Beverly Bancroft, with whom he had one child, Yves. Beverly Bancroft died in 2013.

Berger died at his home in Antony, France, on 2 January 2017 at the age of 90.

== Legacy ==
In July 2009, Berger donated his archive to the British Library including literary manuscripts, drafts, research notes and unpublished material, correspondence, press cuttings and professional papers. The archive contains some early and marginal examples of Berger's graphic work, but is chiefly literary in nature, and its organisation is largely that of Berger’s wife Beverly. The physical archive is described as "369 files, 9 boxes and 1 book".

== Awards ==
- 1972: Booker Prize
- 1972: James Tait Black Memorial Prize
- 1991: Petrarca-Preis
- 2009: Golden PEN Award

== Literary works ==
=== Fiction ===
==== Novels and novella ====
- A Painter of Our Time (1958)
- Marcel Frishman (with George Besson) (1958)
- The Foot of Clive (1962)
- Corker's Freedom (1964)
- G. (1972)
- Into Their Labours trilogy (1991): Pig Earth (1979), Once in Europa (1987), Lilac and Flag (1990)
- To the Wedding (1995)
- King: A Street Story (1999)
- Here is Where We Meet (2005)
- From A to X (2008)

==== Plays ====
- A Question of Geography (with Nella Bielski) (1987)
- Les Trois Chaleurs (1985)
- Boris (1983)
- Goya's Last Portrait (with Nella Bielski) (1989)

==== Screenplays ====
- Jonah Who Will Be 25 in the Year 2000 (with Alain Tanner) (1976)
- La Salamandre (The Salamander) (with Alain Tanner) (1971)
- Le Milieu du monde (The Middle of the World) (with Alain Tanner) (1974)
- Play Me Something (with Timothy Neat) (1989)
- Une ville à Chandigarh (A City at Chandigarh) (1966)

==== Poetry ====
- Pages of the Wound (1994)
- Collected Poems (2014)

=== Non-fiction ===
==== Essays and articles ====
- The Look of Things: Selected Essays and Articles (1972)
- About Looking (1980)
- A Fortunate Man (with Jean Mohr) (1967)
- Keeping a Rendezvous (1992)
- Photocopies (1996)
- Selected Essays (Geoff Dyer, ed.) (2001)
- Hold Everything Dear: Dispatches on Survival and Resistance (2007; 2nd edition 2016)
- Why Look at Animals? (2009)
- Confabulations (Essays) (2016)
- Meanwhile (2008)
- Swimming Pool (with Leon Kossoff) (Introduction by Deborah Levy. Postscript by Yves Berger. Berger's Texts selected by Teresa Pintó. Book design by John Christie) (2020)

==== Art and art criticism ====
- Permanent Red (1960) (Published in the United States in altered form in 1962 as Toward Reality: Essays in Seeing)
- The Success and Failure of Picasso (1965)
- Art and Revolution: Ernst Neizvestny And the Role of the Artist in the U.S.S.R. (1969)
- The Moment of Cubism and Other Essays (1969)
- Ways of Seeing (with Mike Dibb, Sven Blomberg, Chris Fox and Richard Hollis) (1972)
- The Sense of Sight (1985)
- Albrecht Dürer: Watercolours and Drawings (1994)
- Titian: Nymph and Shepherd (with Katya Berger) (1996)
- The Shape of a Pocket (2001)
- Berger on Drawing (2005)
- Lying Down to Sleep (with Katya Berger) (2010)
- Bento's Sketchbook (2011)
- Understanding a Photograph (Geoff Dyer, ed.) (2013)
- Daumier: The Heroism of Modern Life (2013)
- Portraits: John Berger on Artists (Tom Overton, ed.) (2015)
- Landscapes: John Berger on Art (Tom Overton, ed.) (2016)
- Seeing Through Drawing

==== Other ====
- A Seventh Man (with Jean Mohr) (1975)
- Another Way of Telling (with Jean Mohr) (1982)
- And Our Faces, My Heart, Brief as Photos (1984)
- The White Bird (U.S. title: The Sense of Sight) (1985)
- Isabelle: A Story in Shots (with Nella Bielski) (1998)
- At the Edge of the World (with Jean Mohr) (1999)
- I Send You This Cadmium Red: A Correspondence between John Berger and John Christie (with John Christie) (2001)
- My Beautiful (with Marc Trivier) (2004)
- The Red Tenda of Bologna (2007)
- War with No End (with Naomi Klein, Hanif Kureishi, Arundhati Roy, Ahdaf Soueif, Joe Sacco and Haifa Zangana) (2007)
- From I to J (with Isabel Coixet) (2009)
- Railtracks (with Anne Michaels) (2011)
- Cataract (with Selçuk Demirel) (2012)
- Flying Skirts: An Elegy (with Yves Berger) (2014)
- Cuatro horizontes (Four Horizons) (with Sister Lucia Kuppens, Sister Telchilde Hinkley and John Christie) (2015)
- Lapwing & Fox (Conversations between John Berger and John Christie) (2016)
- John by Jean: Fifty Years of Friendship (Jean Mohr, ed.) (2016)
- A Sparrow's Journey: John Berger Reads Andrey Platonov (CD: 44:34 & 81-page book with Robert Chandler and Gareth Evans), London: House Sparrow Press in association with the London Review Bookshop (2016)
- Smoke (with Selçuk Demirel) (2017)
- What Time Is It? (with Selçuk Demirel) (Maria Nadotti, ed.) (2019)
- Over To You. Letters Between a Father & Son. Tate Publishing (2024)

=== Film ===
- The Seasons in Quincy: Four Portraits of John Berger (2016), directed by Tilda Swinton, Colin MacCabe, Christopher Roth and Bartek Dziadosz.
- Taskafa: Stories of the Street (2013), directed by Andrea Luka Zimmerman.
- Visioni di case che crollano (Case sparse) (2002), directed by Gianni Celati.

== Reviews ==
- Harkness, Allan (1983), Berger: A Seventh Man?, review of A Seventh Man and Another Way of Telling, in Hearn, Sheila G. (ed.), Cencrastus No. 12, Spring 1983, pp. 46 & 47, ISSN 0264-0856
