= Jean Mohr =

Swiss documentary photographer

- Born: September 13, 1925; Geneva, Switzerland
- Died: November 3, 2018 (aged 93); Collonge-Bellerive, Switzerland
- Education: Geneva University, Académie Julian
- Occupation: Documentary photographer
- Spouse: Simone Turrettini (m. 1956)
- Children: 2
- Website: jeanmohr.ch

Jean Mohr (13 September 1925 in Geneva, Switzerland – 3 November 2018 in Collonge-Bellerive) was a Swiss documentary photographer who had been active since 1949, primarily with some of the major humanitarian organizations of the world, including the United Nations High Commission for Refugees, the International Committee of the Red Cross (ICRC), United Nations Relief and Works Agency for Palestine Refugees in the Near East (UNRWA), the World Health Organization, and the International Labour Organization.

== Early and personal life ==
Mohr was the son of German immigrants who came to Switzerland in 1919. His father applied for Swiss citizenship as a reaction against Hitler, and the family became Swiss citizens in 1939.

Mohr did not become a professional artist until he was 30 years old, first studying economics (as did fellow documentary photographer Sebastião Salgado), receiving his master's degree in Economics and Social Science from Geneva University, and later studying painting at the Académie Julian in Paris.

In 1956, he married Simone Turrettini, a documentary filmmaker. They had two grown sons and five grandchildren.

== Career ==
He produced 26 books of photography, five with his literary collaborator John Berger and one with Edward Said. Mohr's most noteworthy book in his latter career was a 50-year retrospective of his work photographing Palestinian refugees, Side by Side or Face to Face (2003), published in collaboration with the ICRC and the International Red Cross and Red Crescent Museum, in Geneva, where he lived.

He was most famous for his lifelong documentary collaboration with John Berger on six volumes. His other major life's project was the photography of Palestinian refugees over a 50-year period, from his first ICRC assignment in 1949, through the Six-Day War in 1967, to an assignment there for the ICRC in 2002.

He also provided some cinematography and stills for the 1989 film, Play Me Something, written by Berger, directed by Timothy Neat, and starring Berger, Hamish Henderson, and Tilda Swinton. Mohr was the subject of several BBC films, mostly with Berger, including A Photographer Among Men (1975), Pig Earth (1979) and Another Way of Telling (1988), both concerning books by Berger, and Traveling with Jean Mohr. His photos were used in the stage setting of the 1987 opera production Gastarbeiter (Guest Workers) by Vinko Globokar. His work with theatre companies included a production called Check Up by Edward Bond and directed by Carlo Brandt. He also collaborated with and photographed L'Orchestre de la Suisse Romande for ten years, publishing books on two of its conductors.

== Awards ==
Among Mohr's major awards were a 1978 prize from Köln naming him the photographer most involved in the cause of human rights, a 1984, Contemporary Photography Prize in Lausanne for his exhibition C'était demain ("It was tomorrow"), and a 1988 City of Geneva Prize for the Plastic Arts, the first time a photographer had been named. In 1964, Mohr was also designated one of the 50 major Swiss artists of the time. His work may be found in the collection of the Metropolitan Museum of Art among other museums. His photographic archives are kept at the Musée de l'Élysée in Lausanne, Switzerland.

== Published works ==
- Ernest Ansermet (1961)
- J'aime les Marionnettes (1962)
- Serial Atlas des Voyages (1962–68), volumes on Yugoslavia, Finland, Sweden, Norway, Denmark, Ireland, New York, the Middle West, and contributions to the volumes on Czechoslovakia, Sicily, and Moscow
- A Fortunate Man: The Story of a Country Doctor (with John Berger, 1967)
- Art and Revolution (with John Berger, 1969)
- La Suisse insolite (with Louis Gaulis, 1971)
- A Seventh Man (with John Berger, 1975)
- Another Way of Telling (with John Berger, 1981)
- After the Last Sky: Palestinian Lives (with Edward W. Said, 1986)
- Un peu de texte ou pas du tout (1988)
- Le grand livre du Salève (1988)
- Les métiers de la rue (with Jil Silberstein, 1990)
- Armin Jordan, Portrait d’un Chef (with Jean-Jacques Roth, 1997)
- Re-naissance, villa Edelstein (1998)
- At the Edge of the World (with John Berger, 1999)
- Derrière le miroir (with Bernard Crettaz, Jean-Philippe Rapp, John Berger and Katya Berger, 2000)
- Side by Side or Face to Face (2003)
- Manifeste pour une paix juste et durable au Moyen-Orient
- John by Jean: Fifty Years of Friendship. Occasional Press (2016).
- 100 photographs by Jean Mohr for the freedom of the press (Reporters Without Borders, November 2010. With an Introduction by John Berger).

== CD-ROM ==
- Jean Mohr, A photographer’s journey (1200 photos)
