= 1985–1986 Hormel strike =

Labor dispute between Hormel and the United Food and Commercial Workers

- Date: August 17, 1985 – September 13, 1986 (1 year, 3 weeks and 6 days)
- Location: Austin, Minnesota, United States
- Caused by: Unsafe working conditions; Decrease in hourly wages from $10.69 to $8.25
- Goals: Return to $10.69 hourly wage; Improved working conditions
- Methods: Corporate campaign; Boycott; Strike action
- Result: Local P-9 entered into trusteeship by UFCW; UFCW negotiates new labor contract; Hormel subleases part of the meatpacking plant in 1989

Parties
United Food and Commercial Workers Local P-9	Hormel

The 1985–1986 Hormel strike was a labor strike that involved approximately 1,500 workers of the Hormel meatpacking plant in Austin, Minnesota, United States. The strike, beginning August 17, 1985 and lasting until September 13 of the following year, is considered one of the longest strikes in Minnesota history and ended in failure for the striking workers.

Hormel is an American meat processing company founded in 1891 that has both their headquarters and primary facility in Austin. Workers at this plant organized in 1929 and, following some initial strike activity, enjoyed a relatively good relationship with plant management. However, the relationship between the union and management had become more hostile by the 1970s, and in 1975, Hormel announced that they would be replacing the Austin plant with a new facility. In light of this, the union (Local P-9 of the United Food and Commercial Workers (UFCW)) agreed to a new labor contract that included several major concessions from the union. Following the new plant's opening in 1982, employees experienced an increase in injuries caused by the conditions at the plant, and in 1984, Hormel introduced a pay cut. Following this, Local P-9 hired labor activist Ray Rogers and began a corporate campaign against Hormel to pressure them into negotiating a new contract with the union. On August 17, 1985, Local P-9 authorized strike action against Hormel, which was hesitantly approved by UFCW.

The strike caused Hormel to temporarily shut down the plant, and as the strike continued, national coverage of the strike led to a boycott of Hormel products. Hormel reopened the plant in January the following year and rehired approximately 500 strikers alongside that many non-union members. As the strike continued, the Minnesota National Guard was called in, and strikers performed multiple blockades of nearby roads leading to the plant, attempting to block strikebreakers from entering. On April 11, a riot broke out that led to the use of tear gas by the police and several non-fatal injuries. Following the riot, Jesse Jackson traveled to Austin to act as mediator, with no success. Ultimately, UFCW ordered Local P-9 to end the strike in June, and when local officials refused, the UFCW forced the local into receivership. The strike continued until Local P-9, with new officials, agreed to a new contract with Hormel on September 13.

Speaking several years later about the strike, labor historian Jeremy Brecher called the event "perhaps the signal labor struggle of the 1980s." The strike was the subject of discussion and books by several noted labor historians, such as Kim Moody and Peter Rachleff, who cite the strike's failure as a major blow against organized labor in the United States. This event was one of a series of labor strikes during the 1980s that ended in failure for organized labor, including the 1981 PATCO strike and the Arizona copper mine strike of 1983. The strike was later the focus of the Academy Award-winning 1990 documentary film American Dream by Barbara Kopple.

== Background ==
=== Early organized labor activities at Hormel ===
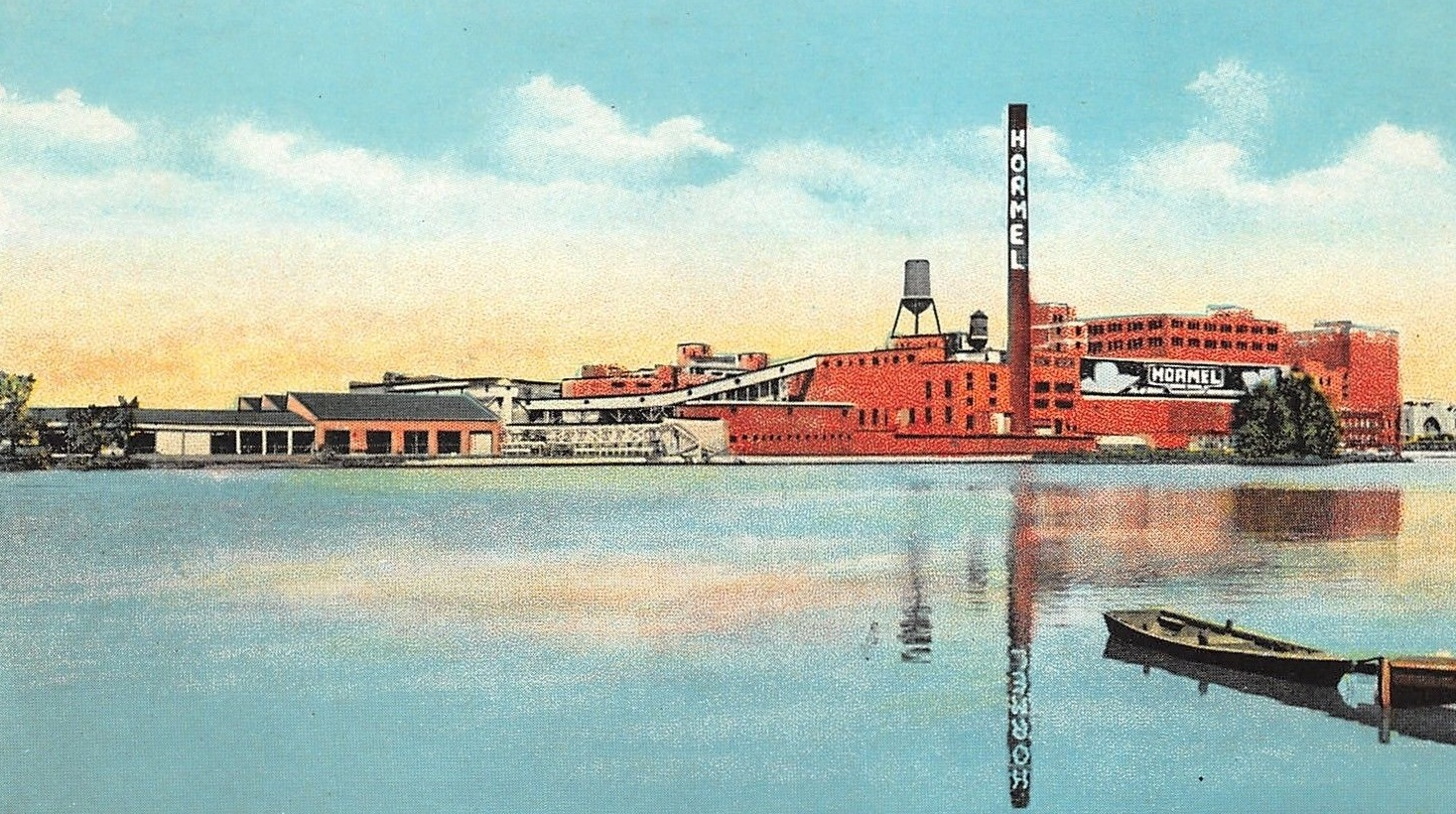
The Hormel meatpacking plant in Austin, Minnesota (1920)

Hormel Foods Corporation was founded by George A. Hormel in Austin, Minnesota, in 1891. In addition to being the location of the company's headquarters, Austin also housed the company's main meat processing plant. The first large scale labor dispute at Hormel occurred in 1933, following the creation of the first labor union at the plant. The union, the Independent Union of All Workers (IUAW), had been organized that year by veteran activist Frank Ellis of the Industrial Workers of the World (IWW), and was closely modeled after the IWW. This included an emphasis on industrial unionism, direct action, and a militant attitude towards employers. In 1933 the meatpackers at the Hormel plant launched the plant's first labor strike. The organized workers demanded the introduction of a seniority system and union recognition in order to have a more active role in decisions involving wages and working conditions. Following a large rally held by the union in July of that year, the union was officially recognized by Hormel in September. On November 10, IUAW members participated in the United States' first recorded sitdown strike, which resulted in three days of negotiations between union representatives and Hormel employers. Minnesota Governor Floyd B. Olson had refused to activate the Minnesota National Guard and instead had traveled to Austin to act as a mediator. Between 1933 and 1937, the IUAW expanded to several cities throughout the area.

While the IUAW was originally an independent union, by 1937 this would change. A series of sitdown strikes in nearby Albert Lea, Minnesota, turned violent with confrontations between the strikers (including union members from the Austin plant) and members of the Freeborn County Sheriff's Department. This confrontation led to direct involvement from Governor Elmer Austin Benson. Following this, IUAW officials agreed to allow union members in Albert Lea to form local unions that would affiliate with national unions associated with the American Federation of Labor (AFL) or the Committee for Industrial Organization (CIO). Gradually, the IUAW allowed all local unions to pursue this path and, in 1937, the members of the Austin plant narrowly voted to approve an affiliation with the Packinghouse Workers Organizing Committee of the CIO. Ultimately, the successor union representing workers at the Austin plant became Local P-9 of the United Food and Commercial Workers. The "P" in Local P-9 indicated that the local had once belonged to the United Packinghouse Workers of America.

=== Increased hostilities between union and company ===
Aside from the strike actions in 1933, the relationship between Hormel and organized labor was generally good, especially under the leadership of Jay Catherwood Hormel, who served as Hormel's president from 1929 to 1954 and was viewed as generally sympathetic to labor. During this time, Hormel was considered an example of industrial democracy, where organized workers had a large say in the operations of the plant as a whole. However, starting in the 1960s, this arrangement began to change. Hormel began enforcing stricter work standards. Between the 1960s and early 1980s, the company often distributed layoff notices to workers during concessions negotiations. Around this same time, Hormel began to expand by acquiring additional meatpacking plants in several other American cities and, in both 1976 and 1981–1982, it urged workers at the Austin plant to either transfer to these new plants or take a severance package. During the 1970s, the non-union Iowa Beef Processors (IBP) began to rapidly expand and pushed many meatpacking companies out of the beef slaughtering industry. As a non-union meatpacking company, the IBP's labor costs were almost half those at a union company such as Hormel. Because of this increased competition, Hormel shut down their beef slaughtering industry at Austin in 1976.

Within the union itself, changes had occurred since its founding. By this time, the local union was dominated by more conservative business unionists who enjoyed a good relationship with management and were often at odds with the rank and file union members. Because of collective bargaining agreements between these business unionists and the company, many of the new union employees hired during this time were paid less and worked less desirable positions with worse safety conditions than the older workers, causing resentment within the union. During this time, the number of employees at the Austin plant reached a peak of about 5,000, which steadily decreased to no more than 1,750 by 1982. Union membership peaked at 4,000 in the early 1950s, decreasing to 800 in the mid-1970s.

=== New plant in Austin ===
In 1975, citing a need to stay competitive, Hormel declared its intent to construct a new meatpacking facility to replace its flagship plant in Austin, calling the building, then 80 years old, outdated. The company entered into contract negotiations with Local P-9 regarding the construction of the new plant and, in 1978, the company said it was considering constructing the plant outside of Austin. Ultimately, Hormel and Local P-9 agreed to a new contract on June 27 of that year. In exchange for keeping the plant in Austin, the union agreed to several concessions. Among these, the union agreed to a wage freeze for seven years, an elimination of incentive pay, a 20% increase in productivity, and a no-strike agreement that would last for three years following the opening of the new plant.

On August 9, 1982, Hormel opened its new flagship plant in Austin, replacing the previous plant. Ultimately, union workers at this new plant were covered under three different labor agreements between the union and company, which included the labor contract they had had at the previous plant, the 1978 concessionary agreements, and an additional concessionary agreement that had been approved in January 1982. Among the provisions, the company agreed that there would be no wage cuts for the duration of the contracts, which were set to last until August 1985. Additionally, the agreements contained a "me too" clause that would allow Hormel to set wages at the plant equal to those of other unionized plants. Following the opening of the new plant, many older members of the union retired and, by 1983, two-thirds of the plant's workforce consisted of people hired after the opening of the new plant. In December of that year, Jim Guyette, who had been a member of the local's executive board since 1980 and had opposed the concessions, was elected president. Along with many newly elected P-9 officials, Guyette sought to be more confrontational and less conciliatory to Hormel management.

Shortly after the opening of this new plant, other meatpacking companies began to pursue wage decreases by either closing union plants and reopening them as non-union plants or by negotiating with unions to take pay cuts at the threat of plant closures. Around this time, meatpacking company Oscar Mayer had negotiated reductions in wages for its employees, and Hormel shortly thereafter began to do the same. In March 1984, Hormel negotiated a new contract with UFCW Local 431 of their Ottumwa, Iowa, plant that included a wage cut from $10.69 to $8.75 per hour. This new contract agreement had taken hundreds of layoffs and three rounds of voting from the local. With this agreement, Hormel then began to pressure the Austin local to a similar wage cut. Shortly after this contract agreement, UFCW officials allowed Hormel to reopen its contract with Local P-9 in September 1984, rather than allowing it to expire the following year. Guyette opposed this action and that month he led Local P-9 out of the company-wide negotiations that had been ongoing between the UFCW and Hormel. Following this move, which surprised many in the negotiations, Hormel instituted a wage cut for Local P-9 and, in October 1984, wages at the plant decreased from $10.69 to $8.25 per hour. Guyette and the local remained opposed to any concessions with Hormel and shortly thereafter Local P-9 (but not UFCW) hired labor consultant Ray Rogers and his New York City-based Corporate Campaign Incorporated (CCI) to wage a corporate campaign against Hormel.

=== Ray Rogers and the corporate campaign ===
Guyette had initially not considered a corporate campaign against Hormel and had initially just wanted to employ a public relations firm to help publicize the events going on between Hormel and the local. However, after reading about Ray Rogers and CCI in Business Week, he called the firm and Rogers explained to Guyette what a corporate campaign entailed. Rogers, a labor activist, had developed a reputation for successful corporate campaigns, such as in 1980, when he helped union members in the southern United States win a union victory against J.P. Stevens & Co. In October 1984, Rogers gave a presentation before members of Local P-9, but on December 20 of that year, UFCW President William H. Wynn announced that the UFCW would not be hiring Rogers. However, in January the next year, Local P-9 agreed to hire Rogers and CCI, approving a $3 per member per week fee increase to cover the consultant's cost. These actions led to fears from Wynn and UFCW Packinghouse division leader Lewie Anderson that Local P-9 was moving towards wildcat strike action.

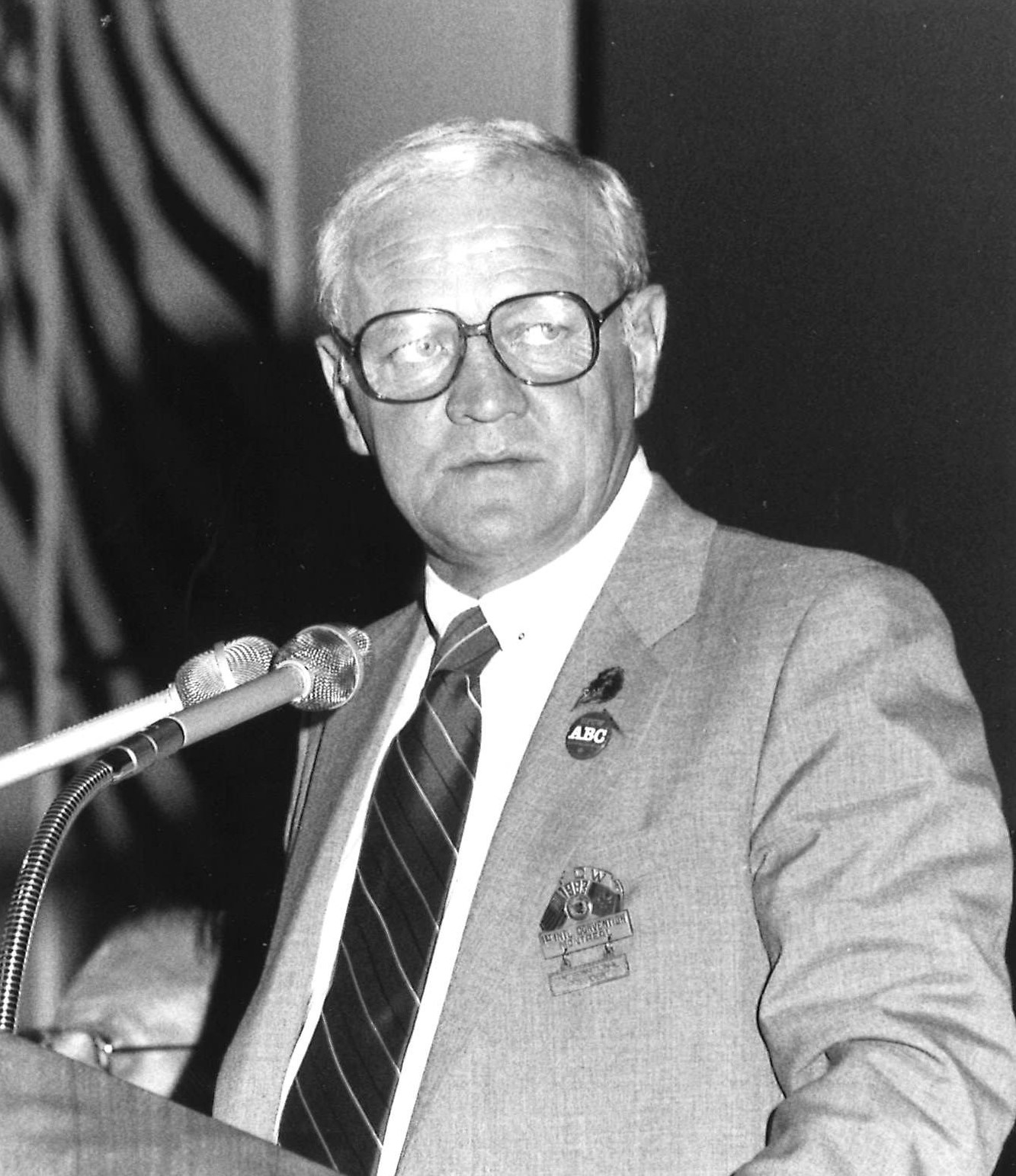
William H. Wynn, President of the UFCW during the strike

Rogers quickly put into action a corporate campaign against Hormel, which included targeting connections between Hormel and First Bank System, a regional firm that had many ties to Hormel. Rogers hoped that the campaign could convince the bank's board of directors to pressure Hormel into rescinding the wage cuts. Rogers also hoped to grow community support for Local P-9 by linking their struggles against Hormel (and by extension First Bank System) to those of many farmers in the area who had had their farms foreclosed by First Bank System. CCI also publicized alleged ties between Hormel and the apartheid government of South Africa, leading to the African National Congress (ANC) supporting Local P-9 against Hormel. (Note: Sources vary on the nature, extent, and validity of the ties. In 2013's Workers in America: A Historical Encyclopedia, Robert E. Weir claims that CCI "unearthed agreements" between the company and government, while a 2018 labor history book claims that CCI "publicized Hormel's ties to unsavory banks and corporations doing business with South Africa's apartheid regime." During the strike, a representative for the company denied any link between Hormel and South Africa's apartheid government. In 2010, a company representative said the following regarding the ties: "Somehow, Rogers and Guyette were afforded the opportunity to appear on Ted Koppel's Nightline program, and, as I recall, they announced that Hormel was a major food manufacturer in South Africa. In fact, I had refused to approve Hormel production in South Africa until the apartheid issue was resolved. We kept asking the media to verify that Hormel was not manufacturing in South Africa – with no response.")

At the same time CCI was looking into Hormel's business ties, members of Local P-9 were attempting to generate local support for the union by distributing over 12,000 copies of their newspaper, The Unionist. Members in the community, primarily wives of Local P-9 members, also organized the Austin United Support Group to help coordinate support for the local, create an emergency fund, and raise morale. Workers also protested at Hormel's stockholders' meeting.

As the corporate campaign continued through 1985, the expiration date for the local's contract with Hormel was approaching. On August 7, 1985, 93% of Local P-9 voted to authorize a strike. UFCW approved the strike on the condition that Local P-9 not expand the strike to other plants (creating what were known as "roving pickets") and that the corporate campaign was to end. However, Wynn agreed to support roving pickets if negotiations with the company failed. The strike officially began on August 17, 1985, with about 1,500 workers striking. (Note: Sources vary regarding the exact number of strikers, with most claiming estimates of around 1,500 or 1,400. The phrasing used here of "about 1,500" is the one given by MNopedia: The Minnesota Encyclopedia, which is administered by the Minnesota Historical Society.)

== Course of the strike ==
=== Early activities during the strike ===
With a substantial part of their workforce gone, Hormel temporarily shut down operations at their Austin plant. Production was shifted to eight other meatpacking plants, including several unionized plants in the Midwest. As the strike occurred after the contract between the local and Hormel had expired, it was a legal strike and therefore constitutionally obligated to receive strike funds from UFCW. However, Wynn and Anderson did not support the strike and sought to minimize UFCW's support for Local P-9 and undermine their efforts. For example, in November of the previous year the UFCW had distributed letters allegedly written by leaders at other Hormel local unions, criticizing Local P-9's actions. Additionally, the ban on roving pickets that UFCW had placed on Local P-9 significantly hurt their efforts to coordinate support from other unionized meatpacking plants, including those where production from the Austin plant had been shifted.

As part of the strike, union members engaged in acts of protest including picketing and rallying. According to MNopedia, early into the strike, Hormel offered 300 strikers retirement benefits if they ceased striking, with 30 employees accepting the offer. In September 1985, the National Labor Relations Board sought and were granted an injunction against Local P-9 that stopped their boycott against First Bank System, ruling that it constituted an illegal secondary boycott. UFCW used this ruling as an opportunity to further hurt Local P-9, as they convinced the AFL–CIO in Minnesota to ban any literature from Local P-9 at their meetings, arguing that the literature reference First Bank System and therefore violated the injunction.

During the strike, arbitrators attempted to negotiate a deal between Hormel and the local, and by the end of 1985, Hormel proposed a "two-tier" system consisting of $10 per hour standard wages for current employees and $8 per hour wages for new hires. In December 1985, members of Local P-9 voted via secret ballot to reject the offer proposed by Hormel. Another proposal was again voted against in January 1986. Strikers had wanted a return to the $10.69 per hour wage and alleged that the proposal did not address issues such as seniority and working conditions. Since reopening, the plant had experienced an increased injury rate compared to the previous plant, and it led all meatpacking plants in the United States in number of workplace injuries. Following this, Hormel announced the reopening of the Austin plant on January 13, announcing the hiring of strikebreakers, referred to by union members as "scabs." That same month, Anderson publicly criticized Guyette on television, and the UFCW began to employ red-baiting to further hurt Local P-9. On the date of the plant's reopening, hundreds of strikers blocked access to the plant, which they proceeded to do for the next several days. In light of this blocking and increasing hostilities from the strikers, on January 21, Minnesota Governor Rudy Perpich sent the Minnesota National Guard to protect the strikebreakers. The governor withdrew the National Guard from the city in February, leaving the handling of the ongoing strike in the hands of the local law enforcement officials. Following Hormel's reopening, approximately 540 strikebreakers, mostly migrant workers from Mexico, joined 500 union members who crossed their own picket lines to return to work.

=== Roving strikes ===
Following the reopening of the plant, Local P-9 defied the UFCW and began to seek support from other unionized meatpacking plants. Following the failure to come to an agreement with Hormel, Local P-9 sought the approval of roving pickets from the UFCW, but Wynn failed to honor his agreement with the local and did not sanction any pickets outside Austin. Regardless, P-9 members began to organize roving strikes at other meat processing plants. In Iowa, their pickets at a plant in Algona went largely ignored by the union members there, while in Ottumwa, approximately 750 workers joined their strike. The plant management responded by firing over 500 of the workers who had joined the strike, and P-9 ended their strike in Ottumwa after four days. Additional roving strikes occurred in Dubuque, Iowa; Fremont, Nebraska; and Dallas and Houston in Texas, with mixed results. On February 16, 200 Austin strikers visited a non-Hormel meatpacking plant in Dubuque and, despite resistance from UFCW officials there claiming that the picket was unsanctioned, were joined by approximately 450 workers from that plant. In Fremont, only 65 of the 850 workers at the plant refused to cross the picket line, with 50 of those strikers fired for the strike activity. At a small plant in Dallas, operations were temporarily halted after the entire 52 person workforce refused to cross the picket line. Meanwhile, on February 10, Hormel resumed activities at their Austin plant for the first time since the strike began, with a workforce of over 1,000 strikebreakers and several hundred defected strikers. Five days later, a pro-Local P-9 rally in Austin was attended by over 3,000 supporters.

Through February and into March, large rallies were also held in several large American cities, including Detroit, New York City, and San Francisco. Additionally, car convoys were organized in Minnesota and Wisconsin to transport food to the strikers, with 140,000 tons of supplies transported to the protestors on April 5.

=== UFCW withdraws sanction and protests escalate ===
On March 9, a demonstration outside the plant turned violent, and the following day over 100 protestors were arrested. Following this event, on March 13, the UFCW International Executive Board voted to withdraw its sanction for the strike. Without the parent union's sanction, Local P-9 ceased to receive strike funds and the strike technically became a lockout. Despite this, on March 16, the members of Local P-9 voted to continue the strike. On March 27 and again on April 6, protestors attempted to block access to the plant and stop strikebreakers from entering. Both times, police broke up the blockades, with 13 protestors arrested on April 6. April 9 began three days of protests that again involved blocking access to the plant. While events on the first two days remained peaceful, on April 11, 400 protestors blocked the main gates to the Hormel plant for four hours, shutting down the plant. The blockade had started at 4:00 am that morning, and two hours later, 100 police officers met the protestors and told them to disperse. Afterwards, police began to arrest protestors and after 20 minutes began to use tear gas to disperse the crowds. According to the Austin Daily Herald, 9 officers were treated for injuries. By 8:20 am, the plant was reopened. 17 protestors, including Rogers, were arrested, and a warrant was issued for Guyette for "aiding and abetting a riot." Described in the media as a riot, the protest received significant media coverage, including articles published by the Minneapolis Star and Tribune and the St. Paul Pioneer Press and Dispatch, with the former calling the event "among the worst in state labor history." The following day, 5,000 supporters of Local P-9 attended a rally in Austin that was organized by the local and the National Rank and File Against Concessions (NRFAC). At the rally, a member of Local P-40 in Cudahy, Wisconsin announced that their local would withhold payments to the UFCW until the national union re-sanctioned the strike, soliciting cheers from the crowd with the show of solidarity for Local P-9.

In many ways what Selma, Ala., was to the voting rights movement in '65, Austin, Minnesota, has become that to collective bargaining in 1986.

— Jesse Jackson, speaking to protestors in Austin on April 13, 1986.

On April 13, civil rights activist and politician Jesse Jackson arrived in Austin in an attempt to mediate between the local and Hormel. (Note: This is disputed by a representative of Hormel, who claims that Jackson did not offer to mediate, but still offered his help to resolve the strike.) He was greeted by hundreds of cheering protestors at the Austin Municipal Airport and met with jailed protestors, where he led them in singing "We Shall Overcome". Later that day he spoke at a rally to over 1,000 protestors and compared the protests in Austin to those in Selma in 1965. Jackson left later that day after speaking to officials from both the company and the local, saying, "There is more than a reasonable chance that we will return." While Jackson did continue to speak with executives at Hormel for the next few weeks, urging them to continue talks with Local P-9, nothing came of these talks, and Jackson did not return to Austin for the duration of the strike.

=== Trusteeship process and end of the strike ===
Beginning on April 14, UFCW held closed-doors hearings where they initiated a process to put Local P-9 under trusteeship. According to UFCW, the reason for this was Local P-9's refusal to end the strike after it had become unsanctioned in March. The hearings, lasting two days, were held in a meeting room in the Minneapolis Public Library and were attended by Guyette and several members of the executive board of Local P-9, with several P-9 union members serving as sergeant-at-arms. Over the course of the hearings, UFCW officials argued over whether Local P-9 had in fact violated the March announcement calling for an end to striking, while officials from Local P-9 argued that the order by UFCW to end the strike had been illegitimate on the grounds that it lacked the constitutional authority to impose such an order. Following the hearings, executives at UFCW announced a decision regarding trusteeship would be announced in mid-May. Following the hearings, the executives of Local P-9 announced their intent to sue UFCW in order to stop the trusteeship process.

In late April, Federal judge Edward Devitt, at the behest of attorneys from the National Labor Relations Board (NLRB) ordered Local P-9 to cease mass picketing at the Hormel plant while the NLRB investigated whether some actions by Local P-9 against Hormel had violated Federal law. Following this, officials at Local P-9 reviewed their legal options, and on May 6, Local P-9 filed a lawsuit against UFCW alleging $13 million in damages from UFCW for their attempts to undermine the local union. On May 9, UFCW executives ordered Local P-9 to be placed under trusteeship, a decision which was upheld in court by Devitt on June 2. That day, UFCW officials occupied Local P-9's offices, seized funds and records from the local, and changed the locks to the building. Some of these funds were diverted back to UFCW's coffers, including $1.5 million in donations to Local P-9 that were diverted to UFCW to make up for their loss of dues during the strike. UFCW had also targeted the Austin United Support Group, but because the group was officially independent from the union, it was able to relocate to new offices and UFCW was not able to shut it down. While the placing of Local P-9 under trusteeship effectively ended the strike against Hormel, it did not come to an official end for the next several months.

=== Mural ===
On April 12, Mike Alewitz discussed creating a mural to maintain participation in the strike. Materials had been donated by members of a sign painters union in St. Paul, Minnesota. The project, an 80 foot by 16 foot mural painted on the side of Local P-9's offices, involved hundreds of strike supporters and was dedicated on May 27 to Nelson Mandela, the then-jailed leader of the ANC. The dedication ceremony had been attended by several South African nationals, including a shop steward with the South African Commercial, Catering and Allied Workers Union in South Africa. The mural depicted a green snake, decapitated by a meatpacker, alongside organized workers, led by one carrying a torch. One of the workers is behind bars, and underneath the workers was the popular IWW motto, "If blood be the price of your cursed wealth, good God we have paid in full." Explaining the symbolism of the snake, Alewitz said, "We assimilated the serpent to stand for the corporations from a Russian revolutionary poster." After the UFCW had occupied Local P-9's offices, they attempted to remove the mural, but found no unionized sandblasters willing to remove the art, leading to UFCW staffers removing it. By October the mural was removed. Alewitz later incorporated elements from the mural into another mural painted in 1990 at the Southern California Library for Social Studies and Research.

=== Further action by Local P-9 and the end of the strike ===
On June 9, 800 members of Local P-9 sent a letter to the NLRB urging them to decertify the UFCW Local in Austin in favor of an alternative, independent union. Initially called "Original P-9", this name was rejected by the NLRB on the grounds that it was too similar to Local P-9, and so the name was changed to North American Meat Packers Union (NAMPU). Efforts to decertify the UFCW ultimately ended in failure. At the same time, the Austin United Support Group continued to give offer financial support to workers affected by the strike, and on August 17 held a protest to mark the one year anniversary of the start of the strike. Meanwhile, the UFCW continued their negotiations with Hormel, with the stated goals of the UFCW to be an end to the two-tier pay system and a common expiration date for all labor contracts between Hormel and UFCW local unions. In this capacity, the UFCW also engaged in negotiations concerning six additional Hormel plants. While negotiations continued in Austin, in Ottumwa a mediator ruled that the 507 workers who had been fired at the Hormel plant there in response to the roving picket should be reinstated with full seniority.

By late August, UFCW officials and Hormel had come to an agreement regarding new labor contracts at the Austin plant, and shortly thereafter a vote was held among Local P-9 members. UFCW officials stated that several hundred replacement workers, as well as Local P-9 members who had crossed their own picket lines, would be able to vote on the agreement, and on September 12 UFCW announced that the agreement had passed with a vote of 1,060 in favor to 440 against. The agreement was finalized by all parties the following day, ending the strike.

== Aftermath and legacy ==
=== Results of the contract ===
As part of the agreements between Hormel and the UFCW affecting six of their plants, Hormel agreed to increase wages to $10.70 per hour by September 1988. Officials from the UFCW had managed to gain this concession after Oscar Mayer had announced a similar wage increase that would take effect in 1989. Until then, workers would be paid $10.25 per hour, which had been the same pay rate the strikebreakers had been paid. Additionally, Hormel agreed to a new system for arbitration pertaining to worker's grievances. As part of concessions on the part of the union, however, Hormel was allowed to discontinue escrow accounts for workers who had been hired prior to the opening of the new plant. Former strikers were also put on a preferential hiring list, but a clause in the contract barred any employees at the plant from encouraging a boycott of Hormel. This contract was to last four years, as opposed to the three-year contracts at other Hormel plants.

Ultimately, only about 20% of the strikers returned to their jobs at the plant. Many of those involved in the strike were removed from the rehiring list due to activities during the strike. Citing the clause barring support for any boycott of Hormel, some former strikers were removed from the list due to having bumper stickers supporting the boycott or for attending rallies where the boycott was promoted. Furthermore, in 1989, Hormel began to sublease a part of the plant to a firm that paid $6.50 per hour. This company, called Quality Pork Processors (QPP), took over much of the animal slaughter part of the plant's operations, and by the mid-1990s had brought in a new workforce of mostly Mexican American men. The results of the strike also had an impact on the demographics of Austin, as approximately a quarter of the population in 2010 were minority.

=== Later analysis and legacy ===
The strike was the subject of a documentary film, American Dream, by filmmaker Barbara Kopple, which was filmed during the strike. The film won the Academy Award for Best Documentary Feature at that year's Academy Awards. The strike was later the subject of a 2020 stage play written by Philip Dawkins for the Children's Theatre Company called Spamtown, USA, which focused on the children of several Hormel workers on different sides of the strike. The play was generally well received and garnered recognition from several publications, including The New York Times.

The strike has been covered and discussed in various forms of media, including books by notable labor historians, such as Kim Moody's An Injury to All: The Decline of American Unionism, Peter Rachleff's Hard-pressed in the Heartland: The Hormel Strike and the Future of the Labor Movement, and Michael Yates's Power on the Job: The Legal Rights of Working People. Speaking of the strike in 1993, labor historian Jeremy Brecher called the strike "perhaps the signal labor struggle of the 1980s." Moody called the strike "one of the most visible and controversial labor struggles of the 1980s." Several authors viewed Hormel's hardline stance against the strikers as similar to then-President Ronald Reagan's stance during the 1981 PATCO strike, where Reagan had fired over 11,000 air traffic controllers who had gone on strike. Following this event, similar strikes occurred that saw companies become less conciliatory towards strikers, and in general, membership and the power of organized labor saw a significant decrease during this time.

One point of discussion regarding the strike lies in the fact that the wage cuts that had precipitated the strike came during a year when Hormel declared a $29 million profit. Another major point of discussion relating to the failure of the strike was the lack of support from the parent union for the local union. In 2013, labor historian Robert E. Weir claimed that "nearly all scholars interpret the UFCWU's actions as heavy-handed and autocratic." Weir also claimed that most scholars reject the notion that the UFCW's actions were justified in negotiating better deals with Hormel. In his 1994 book Power on the Job, Yates criticized the UFCW for its lack of support for the roving pickets that started in early 1986, saying that had the parent union fully supported these activities, "the strike might still have been won." A 2019 retrospective in the labor magazine Labor Notes called UFCW's actions during the strike "sabotage from above." Weir also commented on the effectiveness of the corporate campaign, saying that parent union support for Rogers and the CCI could have succeeded at Hormel, citing its success at the Ravenswood strike that occurred several years later.

During the strike, on January 26, 1986, a news helicopter carrying a reporter crashed en route to Austin. News correspondent Bill O'Reilly was a friend of the reporter and gave a eulogy at his funeral, prompting ABC News executives attending the funeral to hire him.

== Bibliography ==
- Albrecht, Sandra L. (2017). The Assault on Labor: The 1986 TWA Strike and the Decline of Workers' Rights in America. Lexington Books. ISBN 978-1-4985-3771-1 – via Google Books.
- Baier, Elizabeth (2010-08-09). "History of the Hormel meatpackers strike". The Current. Minnesota Public Radio. Archived from the original on 2020-11-05.
- Baier, Elizabeth (2010-08-17). "25 years ago, Hormel strike changed Austin, industry". KNOW-FM. Minnesota Public Radio. Archived from the original on 2020-11-01.
- Baker, Bob (1991-07-27). "Ex-Air Traffic Controllers Recall Strike With Regret : Labor: Few of the 11,400 workers fired by President Reagan 10 years ago found jobs that are as satisfying". Los Angeles Times. Archived from the original on 2021-03-24.
- Berdan, Kathy (2020-02-20). "'Spamtown, USA' looks at kids caught in the middle of the Hormel strike in Austin back in the 1980s". St. Paul Pioneer Press. Digital First Media. Archived from the original on 2020-02-22.
- Bernstein, Harry (1986-04-02). "Hormel Union Dissidents Pick Bad Time for Good Fight". Los Angeles Times. Archived from the original on 2020-11-05.
- Boyce, Steve; Edwards, Jake; Wetzel, Tom (Summer 1986). "Slaughterhouse Fight: A Look at the Hormel Strike". Ideas and Action (7). Archived from the original on 2020-07-28 – via Industrial Workers of the World.
- Brown, Curt (2015-07-11). "Hormel strike Aug. 1985 – June 1986The two-front labor war in Austin". Star Tribune. Archived from the original on 2020-10-17.
- Collins-Hughes, Laura (2020-02-18). "'Spamtown, USA' Looks at a Bitter Strike Through Children's Eyes". The New York Times. ISSN 0362-4331. Archived from the original on 2020-03-28.
- Di Mattia, Joseph (1991-12-01). "Of Politics and Passion: Barbara Kopple's American Dream". International Documentary Association. Archived from the original on 2020-09-21.
- Gabriel, Jackie S. (2009). "Unionizing the "Jungle": A Century of Meatpacking Strikes". In Brenner, Aaron; Day, Benjamin; Ness, Immanuel (eds.). The Encyclopedia of Strikes in American History. M. E. Sharpe. ISBN 978-0-7656-2645-5 – via Google Books.
- Gagala, Ken (1985). "A Wobbly-Bred Campaign in Minnesota". Labor Research Review. 1 (7). Cornell University School of Industrial and Labor Relations.
- Glass, Andrew (2017-08-05). "Reagan fires 11,000 striking air traffic controllers, Aug. 5, 1981". Politico. Capitol News Company. Archived from the original on 2021-03-05.
- Green, Hardy (1990). On Strike at Hormel: The Struggle for a Democratic Labor Movement. Temple University Press. ISBN 978-0-87722-635-2. JSTOR j.ctv6mtdg6.13.
- Hewitt, Chris (2020-02-15). "Children weathered one of Minnesota's worst labor crises. This play tells the story". Star Tribune. Archived from the original on 2020-09-30.
- Horowitz, Roger (1997). Negro and White, Unite and Fight!: A Social History of Industrial Unionism in Meatpacking, 1930–90. University of Illinois Press. ISBN 978-0-252-06621-4 – via Google Books.
- Hubbard, Rob (2020-02-22). "Review: 'Spamtown, USA' compellingly conveys a community in conflict". St. Paul Pioneer Press. Digital First Media. Archived from the original on 2020-04-06.
- Johnson, Dirk (1987-11-10). "Austin Journal; The Home of Hormel: A Town Still Divided". The New York Times. ISSN 0362-4331. Archived from the original on 2020-10-22.
- Kitman, Marvin (2007). The Man Who Would Not Shut Up: The Rise of Bill O'Reilly. St. Martin's Griffin. ISBN 978-0-312-38586-6.
- Knowlton, Richard L.; Beyma, Ron (2010). Points of Difference: Transforming Hormel (1st ed.). Morgan James Publishing. ISBN 978-1-60037-674-0 – via Google Books.
- Kwik, Phil (1986-05-01). "Leaders of Hormel Strike Arrested; International Holds Trusteeship Hearing". Labor Notes. Archived from the original on 2020-09-19.
- "How Strikes Lose". Labor Notes. 2019-10-17. Archived from the original on 2020-05-24.
- "Effects of Hormel Strike Linger in Minnesota Town". Los Angeles Times. Associated Press. 1986-12-25. Archived from the original on 2020-10-24.
- Malnic, Eric (1987-06-08). "PATCO Nightmare Fading : Air Controllers Appear Ready to Unionize Again". Los Angeles Times. Archived from the original on 2021-03-24.
- Marks, Susan (2019-07-31). "Hormel Strike, 1985–1986". MNopedia. Minnesota Historical Society. Archived from the original on 2020-10-10.
- Moody, Kim (1988). An Injury to All: The Decline of American Unionism. Verso Books. ISBN 978-1-78478-783-7 – via Google Books.
- Murolo, Priscilla; Chitty, A. B. (2018). From the Folks Who Brought You the Weekend: An Illustrated History of Labor in the United States. The New Press. ISBN 978-1-62097-449-0 – via Google Books.
- Murray, R. Emmett (2010). The Lexicon of Labor: More Than 500 Key Terms, Biographical Sketches, and Historical Insights Concerning Labor in America. The New Press. ISBN 978-1-59558-226-3 – via Google Books.
- "Today in labor history: Hormel meatpackers launch historic 1985 strike". People's World. 2015-08-17. Archived from the original on 2020-10-31.
- Perl, Peter (1986-02-16). "The Hormel Strike Was Doomed". The Washington Post. Archived from the original on 2019-07-18.
- Rachleff, Peter J. (1993). Hard-pressed in the Heartland: The Hormel Strike and the Future of the Labor Movement. South End Press. ISBN 978-0-89608-450-6 – via Google Books.
- Rachleff, Peter (September–October 2000). "They Say Give, We Say Fight Back: The Legacy of the Hormel Strike, Fifteen Years Later". Dollars & Sense. Archived from the original on 2020-10-31.
- Rachleff, Peter (2007). Arnesen, Eric (ed.). Encyclopedia of U.S. Labor and Working-class History. Vol. 1. Taylor & Francis. ISBN 978-0-415-96826-3 – via Google Books.
- Rachleff, Peter (2013-12-17). "Minnesota labor and the anti-apartheid struggle". Twin Cities Daily Planet. Archived from the original on 2016-08-29.
- Rahim, M. Afzalur (2001). Managing Conflict in Organizations (3rd ed.). Greenwood Publishing Group. ISBN 978-1-56720-262-5 – via Google Books.
- Risen, James (1986-01-22). "National Guard Closes Hormel's Plant". Los Angeles Times. Archived from the original on 2019-07-19.
- Serrin, William (1986-02-15). "Local and National Union Clash Over Tactics in Hormel Strike". The New York Times. ISSN 0362-4331. Archived from the original on 2020-07-29.
- "The Rev. Jesse Jackson, hailed as the last hope..." United Press International. 1986-04-13. Archived from the original on 2020-11-04.
- Warren, James (1990-10-09). "FILM CAPTURES GRIT OF HORMEL STRIKE". Chicago Tribune. Tribune Publishing. Archived from the original on 2020-11-05.
- Warren, Wilson J. (2007). Tied to the Great Packing Machine: The Midwest and Meatpacking. University of Iowa Press. ISBN 978-1-58729-774-8 – via Google Books.
- Weinstein, Henry (1987-02-16). "Doggedly Fight for Their Jobs : Fired Hormel Co. Strikers Seek Support of AFL-CIO". Los Angeles Times. Archived from the original on 2020-11-05.
- Weir, Robert E. (2013). Workers in America: A Historical Encyclopedia. Vol. 1. ABC-Clio. ISBN 978-1-59884-719-2 – via Google Books.
- Yates, Michael (1994). Power on the Job: The Legal Rights of Working People. South End Press. ISBN 978-0-89608-497-1 – via Google Books.
