= Comprehensive campaign =

Labor union tactic

A comprehensive campaign is labor union organizing or a collective bargaining campaign with a heavy focus on research, the use of community coalition-building, publicity and public pressure, political and regulatory pressure, and economic and legal pressure in addition to traditional organizing tactics.

The comprehensive campaign is a labor tactic primarily used in the United States, where labor unions lack many of the legal protections accorded their counterparts in the European Community and where cultural norms against unions are not as strong. However, as globalization increases and capital and labor become more mobile, employers outside the U.S. are adopting American union-avoidance tactics, and comprehensive campaigns are becoming more common in Europe and Asia.

Comprehensive campaigns are not commonly used in the United States due to their cost and the organizational expertise they require. However, they are gaining popularity in the U.S. labor movement, and many unions claim to be building comprehensive campaign capabilities.

== Definition of a comprehensive campaign ==
=== Community campaigns ===
The comprehensive campaign is an evolution of labor union tactics, a process which has been ongoing in the United States since the 1960s. The identification of "good organizing practices," which arose out of a wave of labor union organizing in the 1930s and 1940s, was no longer proving effective for a variety of reasons (innovations in union-avoidance and anti-union tactics, economic and cultural changes, statutory and case law alterations in federal labor protections, etc.).

Innovations in grass-roots community organizing, developed outside the labor movement in the 1960s, offered American unions a new way with which to exercise power vis-a-vis employers. In 1971, radical activist Saul Alinsky published Rules for Radicals, a book which outlined the new strategy of the "community campaign." Activists believed that suburbanization, the rise of multinational corporations, economic dislocation and the alienating effects of modern life had eroded communal norms against corporate greed and misbehavior. By rebuilding a sense of community by uniting existing organizations into new coalitions, or creating new organizations and then educating the coalition members about various causes, these activists believed they could alter the balance of power in their communities. The concept of the community campaign was quickly transferred to the labor movement.

Community campaigns frequently use the strategy of labor-community coalitions, or coalitions between unions and community organizations. Coalitions have varying forms and success, depending on the context in which they are organized and the strategies used to build them.

=== Corporate campaigns ===
As employers learned about the techniques of the community campaign and discovered sophisticated ways to neutralizing the advantages it gave a union, labor unions expanded their repertoire of tactics as well.

The corporate campaign was developed to augment, and sometimes supplant, the community campaign. The corporate campaign identified and influenced members of a company's board of directors, or the company lenders, customers and/or suppliers. The goal was to uncover conflicts of interest, inefficiency, waste, fraud, or mismanagement and use this information, either publicly or privately, to win economic leverage over an employer and achieve the union's goals.

Again, employer adaptations undercut the effectiveness of the corporate campaign. Additionally, labor unions found it less expensive to build community coalitions, and relied more heavily on staff-driven corporate campaigns. Many union activists also argued that the publicity generated by a rowdy shareholder meeting, for example, or an embarrassing report about conflict of interest on a board of directors, supplanted the community campaign by building the necessary community pressure. These arguments proved incorrect. But declining union fortunes (literally) made it difficult to employ the staff and resources necessary to build full-fledged community campaigns. More and more unions came to rely on the corporate campaign even as it became less and less effective.

=== Comprehensive campaigns ===
The comprehensive campaign combines the elements of the community campaign and corporate campaign, but is much more far-reaching. Bob Harbrant, then-president of the Food and Allied Service Trades Department of the AFL–CIO and an early theorist of comprehensive campaigns, argued in 1987:

This is where comprehensive campaign organizing programs come into existence and why I say not a corporate campaign. A corporate campaign, per se, is too narrow in focus. When I say comprehensive campaign, I am talking about having the widest possible net and scooping up everything.

At the heart of the comprehensive campaign is research concerning the company and a broad-based community campaign which disseminates this research. The comprehensive campaign seeks to utilize all the levers of influence and power against an employer. State or local legislation antithetical to the employer's interests is introduced. Pressure is exerted through business license, zoning and regulatory processes. Political pressure is applied by electing local, state and federal officials, and seeking the appointment of union-friendly bureaucrats. Lawsuits may be filed. Reports and "white papers" may be issued, and relationships with members of the press built. Picketing may occur at charity events, at the homes of board members or senior corporate officers, at the workplace, or at the place of business of subsidiaries, customers or suppliers. The support of religious, community, civic, consumer, environmental and other groups is won and continuously displayed to the employer and the public. As information is uncovered, it is assessed and fit into a strategic plan extending (in some cases) several years into the future. Escalation is planned, back-door channels sought (through which negotiations may be conducted), and new allies found. The comprehensive campaign is a pressure campaign, one which seeks to continuously apply pressure until the employer makes an egregious error (for example, harms the community in some way or overreacts to union pressure) or the union uncovers embarrassing or damaging information.

=== Continuing confusion over term of art ===
There is, however, still some confusion over the term "comprehensive campaign". In part, this is because some writers use the term "comprehensive" as an adjective for the word "campaign" rather than as a term of art. For example, Bronfenbrenner and Hickey define a comprehensive campaign as one which contains the following elements:

... 1) adequate and appropriate staff and financial resources; 2) strategic targeting; 3) active and representative rank-and-file organizing committees; 4) active participation of member volunteer organizers; 5) person-to-person contact inside and outside the workplace; 6) benchmarks and assessments to monitor union support and set thresholds for moving ahead with the campaign; 7) an emphasis on issues which resonate in the workplace and in the community; 8) creative, escalating internal pressure tactics involving members in the workplace; 9) creative, escalating external pressure tactics involving members outside the workplace, locally, nationally and/or internationally; and 10) building for the first contract during the organizing campaign...

Since nine of the 10 elements listed by Bronfenbrenner and Hickey are elements of "good organizing practices" used in traditional union organizing campaigns, it is clear that they are referring not to the term of art "comprehensive campaign" but to a traditional organizing campaign which is comprehensive (e.g., uses most or all of the traditional organizing tactics).

Other sources exhibit confusion over the term "comprehensive campaign" because they lack knowledge about the state of labor union organizing. In some cases, writers do not appear to understand what a comprehensive campaign is, and equate the term with community campaign or corporate campaign.

Subsequently, use of the term "comprehensive campaign" varies widely among labor activists, employers, attorneys or academics. This may cause confusion when an author or speaker refers to a comprehensive campaign but means something more restricted. Context is often the key to determining exactly what a person means, and speeches and written works must be closely read to determine the actual meaning of the descriptive phrase used.

== Elements of a comprehensive campaign ==
Comprehensive campaigns contain a number of different elements. Some or all of them may be used, and use varies over time and according to circumstances. According to labor union strategists, use of a given element is dictated by strategy and research.

=== Goals and length ===
There may be one or more goals to a comprehensive campaign. Most often, the goal is to form a union at an employer's workplace or multiple workplaces simultaneously. In organizing, the goal of the comprehensive campaign may be to encourage the employer to recognize the union without recourse to a National Labor Relations Board (NLRB) election, to sign a neutrality agreement or code of conduct for the organizing election, to agree to hold an election under the auspices of a neutral third-party, or to recognize the union once it was won an NLRB-sponsored election.

One or all of these may be the goal of the comprehensive organizing campaign.

Comprehensive campaigns are not limited to organizing, however. They may also be aimed at winning an initial or successor collective bargaining agreement, or to achieve a collective bargaining goal or goals (such as a union security clause). Comprehensive campaigns have also been used to prevent plant closings, prevent plant openings, or to encourage the employer to take some action (such as opposing a business competitor, withdrawing support for legislation, etc.).

Comprehensive campaigns vary in length. Many elements of a comprehensive campaign take one or more years to be effective. Subsequently, comprehensive campaigns are often expected to last over many years. But they may last only months or only one or two, if the union's goals are achieved quickly.

=== Three core elements ===
Comprehensive campaigns are notoriously expensive, and require significant lead-time to initiate. Many labor union activists advocate a six-month research effort before the comprehensive campaign begins, making it difficult to properly undertake a comprehensive campaign once a strike or negotiations have begun.

Various elements make up a comprehensive campaign. Chief among these is research. Research into the employer's finances, business strategy, governance, structure, leadership, board of directors, vendors and suppliers, building plans, staffing, billing, and operations (among other things) occurs six months or more before the comprehensive campaign begins. Research into other areas, such as state law and regulatory regimes, community demographics, workplace health and safety, local and state labor union strength, political support and other non-employer issues also occurs. Although the most intense research phase begins before the comprehensive campaign is publicly announced, research continues throughout the comprehensive campaign. Comprehensive campaigns are research-driven: The information discovered is analyzed, assessed and fit into short- and long-term strategies, which then drive additional research as well as dictate the pace, timing, and actions undertaken in the media, legal, community and other realms.

Forging ties and working relations with other groups—the community campaign—is a secondary but vital component of the comprehensive campaign. The goal of the community campaign element varies, depending on the research outcomes. Community campaign tactics may merely extend to coordinating publicity and or joint lobbying, but may also encompass boycotts, information-gathering, electoral politics, educating the community about labor unions, enhancing or impugning reputations, viral marketing and more. Establishing community-based "workers' rights boards"—led by prominent religious or civic leaders—or other investigatory bodies is also common.

Another element of the comprehensive campaign is writing, introducing and seeking the passage of local, county, state or federal legislation inimical to the employer's business interests. Such legislation may be aimed at the business interests of suppliers, vendors, customers, subsidiaries or co-owners as well. The goal of legislative activity may merely be to force the employer to divert resources to lobbying, election politics or other legislative activity, or it may be to enact legislation. Proposed legislation may be as broad as universal healthcare or comprehensive workplace safety laws or as narrow as requiring the employer to collect and publicly report information which is not otherwise available (and which the union may later analyze and use).

An extensive publicity effort is a second and subsidiary, although vital, aspect of the comprehensive campaign. Publicity—often called "the air war"—is one of the primary vehicles by which information gleaned from employer research may be used. The use of "white papers", press conferences, advertising (in all media) or the distribution of research (independent or not) often is an important aspect of the publicity campaign. The creative release of information to the public is increasing. Demonstrations, the use of street theater and music, picketing, leafleting, bannering and disruptive tactics (such as projecting images on a plant's walls at night or using "human flies" to climb buildings and hang banners) are increasingly common means of attracting public attention in an age where information overload is common. Although the timing and duration of the "air war" varies widely, experience suggests that the publicity campaign takes up half to two-thirds of the comprehensive campaign timeline.

A third vital, but secondary, element is traditional organizing. Known as "the ground war" in the labor movement, traditional organizing often occurs late in a comprehensive campaign. In part, this is because research, publicity, building community coalitions, legislative work, legal pressure and other elements of the comprehensive campaign are time-consuming and not immediately effective. But "the ground war" is also staff-intensive (which is to say, expensive), so it is often implemented only in the final stages of the campaign, when the employer has been so weakened that success becomes more likely than not. Research also suggests that workers cannot be "activated" for long periods of time without encountering burnout or discouragement. Hence, the "ground war" is saved for the final stage of the comprehensive campaign.

=== Lesser elements ===
There are other, lesser, elements which make up comprehensive campaigns as well.

"The inside game," in which workers apply pressure from within, may also form part of the comprehensive campaign. "The inside game" consists of activities which can be done on the shop floor or in the workplace. They can be as varied as symbolic demonstrations, petitioning a supervisor for changes, filing strategic grievances, slowdowns or working to rule.

A legal strategy also plays an important role in the comprehensive campaign. Part of the legal strategy may use labor laws to cause the employer to divert management resources to employee relations and away from the anti-union effort. This may involve the strategic filing of unfair labor practice charges or grievances, picketing, leafleting or bannering. Advantage is often taken of workplace health and safety laws, with unions filing health and safety or environmental complaints against the employer. Business and professional licensure, zoning procedures, building permitting and other laws and regulations may also be advantageously (and legitimately) used to hinder, harass and influence the employer to recognize the union, negotiate a contract, or achieve other goals.

As globalization has become more prevalent, international activity has also become an increasingly prominent element of comprehensive campaigns. In many ways, the building of international coalitions of trade unions, environmental groups, consumer federations and others has been an element of comprehensive campaigns since the mid-1980s. American labor unions had little occasion to engage in international activity in the past. In the 2000s, international coalition-building—especially with unions in Western Europe (who represent workers at, and have strong working relationships with, the parent companies of American subsidiaries)—became far more important in the U.S.

== Effectiveness of comprehensive campaigns ==
Within the American labor movement, there is widespread agreement that comprehensive campaigns—while expensive, time-consuming, and labor-intensive—are effective ways to encourage employers to recognize unions, negotiate collective bargaining agreements and achieve similar union goals.

=== Assessment of organizing effectiveness ===
Recent studies indicate that comprehensive campaigns are highly effective at not only countering union-avoidance efforts and anti-union campaigns, but at winning NLRB-sponsored organizing elections:

In elections with moderately aggressive employer campaigns, when the union runs a comprehensive campaign, win rates average 93 percent overall and 75 percent in manufacturing. However, win rates drop to 35 percent overall, 29 percent in manufacturing, when the union fails to run a comprehensive campaign.

Other research is less sanguine, arguing that comprehensive campaigns are most effective only in the context of collective bargaining context. Some preliminary research suggests that comprehensive campaigns tend to fail more often in organizing drives, and appear to have little effect as a non-strike weapon.

=== Assessment of union-building effectiveness ===
Labor unions are deeply concerned with the viability of the local organization which emerges from an organizing drive. The process by which potential members are educated about unions and the labor movement, local leaders are trained, and effective, democratic organizations established is known as "union-building." It is well-recognized that some successful organizing techniques build strong unions, while other, equally successful techniques, do not.

Some early evidence suggests that comprehensive campaigns build strong unions. Weakened employers are unable to counter newly built unions, providing union leaders and members with a much less steep learning curve. Some scholars also find that union members involved in comprehensive campaigns are more active in the collective bargaining process and in the life and culture of the new union.

But other studies find that corporate campaigns are too staff-intensive and discourage member activism. One early analysis showed that comprehensive campaigns tend to be used only against companies that produce brand-name consumer products or that are service-oriented. These campaigns focus heavily on public pressure to force the employer to recognize the union, and fail to engage rank-and-file workers in the development and analysis of research, strategizing, campaign implementation and the "ground war."

== History of comprehensive campaigns ==
Comprehensive campaigns emerged in the 1970s.

The first true comprehensive campaign (which utilized, to some degree, all of the elements described herein) occurred in the mid-1970s. Ray Rogers, a staff organizer with the Amalgamated Clothing Workers of America (ACWA), ran a comprehensive campaign against J.P. Stevens, a large textile manufacturer in the South. The union eventually organized more than 3,000 Stevens workers at 10 plants. The organizing drive was featured in the Academy Award-winning film Norma Rae in 1979.

A second major comprehensive campaign occurred roughly a decade later. In 1984, the Oil, Chemical and Atomic Workers International Union (OCAW) waged a comprehensive campaign against the German chemical company BASF. OCAW mounted a campaign that involved environmental groups and unions in West Germany, and ultimately pressured BASF to end the lockout and sign a contract.

That same year, a corporate campaign run by the Farm Labor Organizing Committee (FLOC), AFL–CIO, ended a six-year strike and boycott and won the union its first contract. In 1978, 2,000 FLOC members walked off their jobs in the Midwest. While some growers were willing to negotiate, big canners such as the Campbell's were unwilling to pay the higher prices which would accompany a unionized workforce. FLOC initiated a boycott of Campbell's. Six years later, not much had changed. In 1984, FLOC asked Ray Rogers (who had left ACWA and founded a consulting firm that helped unions run comprehensive campaigns) for help. Rogers developed a comprehensive campaign strategy which included a well-publicized demonstration at a Campbell Soup shareholder meeting and targeted three members of Campbell's board of directors for economic pressure. In February 1986, Campbell and its growers recognized FLOC as the workers' representative and signed a collective bargaining agreement which provided for wage increases, grievance resolution, insurance, and committees to study pesticide safety, housing, health care, and day care issues. Shortly thereafter, FLOC reached deals with Vlasic, Heinz, Green Bay Foods (now part of Dean Foods), Aunt Jane's (now part of Dean Foods) and Dean Foods.

The first widely acknowledged failure of a comprehensive campaign occurred in 1985. Under pressure from international competition, the U.S. meat packing industry had seen one major bankruptcy and a number of plant closings. In 1984, six of the eight major United Food and Commercial Workers (UFCW) locals in the Hormel chain prepared to re-negotiate wages under wage re-opener. In July, all locals except Local P-9 in Austin, Minnesota, agreed to strike Hormel in September. But by that time, all the locals except P-9 had reached an agreement setting wages at $9.00 an hour, with a $1.00-an-hour increase to occur in 1985. In October 1984, Hormel reduced wages at the Austin plant from $10.69 to $8.25 an hour. Local P-9 subsequently hired Ray Rogers to run a comprehensive campaign to restore wages to their former level. But in December 1984, UFCW refused to support the comprehensive campaign. The workers struck in August 1985, starting the 1985–86 Hormel strike. UFCW initially supported the strike, but refused to sanction a boycott of Hormel products. In January 1986, Hormel re-opened the Minnesota plant with replacement workers, and the strike—and the local—collapsed. The Hormel strike was featured in the 1990 Academy Award-winning documentary American Dream.

Comprehensive campaigns began attracting academic attention in 1985. The first known publication of a work examining comprehensive campaigns was Lawrence Mishel's article, "Strengths and Limits of Non-Workplace Strategies," published in the Fall 1985 issue of Labor Research Review.

Another important comprehensive campaign failed in 1988. In June 1987, workers at the International Paper company mill in Androscoggin, Maine struck to resist company-demanded concessions. Led by Maine AFL–CIO organizer Peter Kellman, the moribund local became a hotbed of worker activism and community organizing. However, inadequate protections of federal labor law and internal union politics (especially those at international union headquarters as well as rivalries between the local union and its parent) led the parent union to refuse to fund the comprehensive campaign. After the company hired replacement workers, the strike ultimately failed.

A comprehensive campaign helped the United Steelworkers (USW) win a contract at Ravenswood Aluminum. In November 1990, Ravenswood Aluminum locked out 1,700 employees as their contract expired and hired replacement workers. USW began a comprehensive campaign which involved a heavy research component. USW eventually publicized the plant's poor safety record, applied political pressure in Congress to protect the domestic aluminum smelting industry, and discovered that Ravenswood Aluminum was controlled by fugitive billionaire Marc Rich. The campaign is notable because of the extensive international pressure the USW brought to bear on Ravenswood and for the creative legal strategies the union employed. Most importantly, however, the Ravenswood effort showed that, properly undertaken and financed, a comprehensive campaign could put so much pressure on an employer that even recourse to permanent replacements could not defeat the union (as the tactic had at Hormel and International Paper).

In 1993, UFCW undertook a comprehensive campaign in the food industry. The UFCW had conducted a decade-long organizing effort against Food Lion, a nonunion chain of warehouse-style grocery stores. By the early 1990s, however, UFCW became convinced that traditional organizing methods were no longer working, and the union initiated a comprehensive campaign. An essential part of the union strategy was an innovative class-action lawsuit by about 400 current and former Food Lion workers, who alleged they had been forced by their employer to work off-the-clock. Eventually, the United States Department of Labor fined Food Lion, which delivered $16 million in back-pay to the workers. UFCW quickly undertook a second class-action suit, in which workers claimed wrongful termination and violation of COBRA rights. Again, UFCW was successful. However, Food Lion retaliated by filing a $300 million lawsuit against its workers and UFCW for violating the federal RICO Act. Although Food Lion's lawsuit was eventually dismissed, UFCW was unable to organized the workers, achieve recognition of the union or negotiate a collective bargaining agreement.

By 1996, comprehensive campaigns had drawn the attention of Congress. Rep. Pete Hoekstra (R--Mich.) introduced legislation to outlaw union corporate campaign tactics. Hearings were held, but the legislation died in subcommittee.

More recent examples of comprehensive campaigns include those waged by SEIU and its Justice for Janitors campaign against custodial firms, the Teamsters against Quebecor World, UNITE HERE against the laundry company Cintas, and SEIU and UFCW against Wal-Mart. There are reports that SEIU is beginning a comprehensive campaign which involves hospitals and other healthcare providers in and around Boston, Massachusetts.

== Criticisms of comprehensive campaigns ==
=== Management-side critics ===
Critics of labor unions argue that comprehensive campaigns violate the spirit, if not letter, of federal labor law. They claim that comprehensive campaigns ignore the established policies and election procedures of the National Labor Relations Act (NLRA), and that—through the use of neutrality and card check agreements—they violate workers' freedom of speech and choice. Some critics argue further that, absent the protection of federal labor law, employees are coerced or misled into signing union authorization cards (e.g., duped into forming a union which can then not be dislodged). A second, but related, criticism is that comprehensive campaigns organize a workplace because union bosses want it organized, not because workers want a union.

Many emerging arguments against comprehensive campaigns are legal in nature. For example, a number of employers have asserted that unions file frivolous lawsuits as part of such efforts, clogging the courts, taking the organizing process out of workers' hands and putting it into those of judges, and diverting resources from useful and efficient causes to "wasteful" legal causes.

A second legal claim is that comprehensive campaigns are not protected activity under the NLRA. In 1958, the Supreme Court ruled in NLRB v. Wooster Division of Borg-Warner Corp., 356 U.S. 342, that unions are prohibited from striking over subjects of bargaining not encompassed by "wages, hours, and other terms or conditions of employment" (the phrase used in the NLRA). Legal critics of comprehensive campaigns claim that the Borg-Warner ruling prohibits unions from exercising economic pressure against an employer when that pressure is not explicitly and directly aimed at changing the terms and conditions of employment.

A third legal argument is that comprehensive campaigns run afoul of federal and state RICO statutes, which prohibit racketeering. "Perhaps the most interesting and significant of the predicate acts likely to be present in a corporate campaign is state law blackmail, which is a species of extortion. Indeed, applying RICO to corporate campaigns comes down, in large measure, to understanding the crime of blackmail under state law, and recognizing that—legally speaking—corporate campaigns are, at bottom, a pattern of blackmail." In the Steelworkers' comprehensive campaign against Bayou Steel, the employer filed a federal RICO action which, although settled before a judge had ruled, "forced the union to devote extensive staff and financial resources to defend themselves, distracting attention and energy from the [comprehensive] campaign itself." In October 2007, Smithfield Foods filed a RICO suit against UFCW over that union's campaign to organize 4,600 workers, and Wackenhut sued SEIU over a campaign to organize that company's security guards.

A fourth legal argument is that comprehensive campaigns violate federal anti-trust law. As unions work with other organizations, it is claimed that they form, essentially, a commercial enterprise which seeks to economically dominate the market much in the same way that a monopoly does. In support of this claim, critics note that the Supreme Court has read the Sherman, Clayton and Norris–LaGuardia acts in such a way that unions are held exempt from federal antitrust laws but only so long as a union acts in its own self-interest and does not lose its primary character as a labor union by combining with other, non-labor groups or organizations. In crafting community and comprehensive campaigns, critics say, unions lose their exemption under these acts.

=== Union-side critics ===
Comprehensive campaigns are not universally supported within labor unions. These union-side critics point out a number of problems with comprehensive campaigns.

First, they argue that comprehensive campaigns undermine the nature of collective activity (e.g., the union). Unions, these critics claim, are democratic organizations which empower members so that they may establish their own goals in the workplace and seek to meet them. The comprehensive campaign, however, replaces worker activism and involvement with staff-driven organizations. Instead of a powerful local union, the comprehensive campaign relies on the power of organizational partners in the community campaign. Worst of all, the comprehensive campaign diverts attention away from employees' goals and needs and toward the economic weaknesses of the employer, and It also subordinates the timing of the organizing drive to court calendars.

Second, such critics argue that comprehensive campaigns waste valuable union resources by engaging in costly litigation. Lawsuits in state or federal court are far more expensive than the hearings and adjudications held under the auspices of the NLRB, and take longer to resolve. In an era in which the employer's primary advantage over the union is financial, critics say, shifting the focus of the organizing drive to the courts exposes the union to high legal costs. In the Food Lion comprehensive campaign, for example, the UFCW paid over $1 million in legal fees litigating its two class-action suits.

Third, some critics allege that the legal strategies of comprehensive campaigns leave workers, unions and elected labor leaders open to legal retaliation. Increasingly, they point out, workers and unions are being sued for libel, slander, tortious business interference and a variety of other state and federal claims which carry heavy fines. Even labor scholars who have spoken publicly about employer misbehavior have been sued. A more conservative organizing approach would be less litigious and less costly.

A fourth, related, legal argument against comprehensive campaigns is that their elements may be used against unions as well. Union leaders, like their corporate counterparts, may engage in insider-dealing, have conflicts of interest, or engage in questionable or embarrassing financial expenditures. For example, a CEO's high pay may be the subject of a comprehensive campaign's publicity effort. But then, so may a union president's high salary. Lawsuits are not the only domain of unions; employers may seek to pre-empt union legal action by filing suits against unions first. They may choose a venue (such as a state court) where judges are less experienced or a court which has proven historically favorable to business claims. Too few unions assess the risks of a "counter-attack" by businesses, critics argue, and end up in trouble themselves.

Finally, an emerging union-side argument against comprehensive campaigns is that legal action may expose the union's internal operations and strategies to employer scrutiny. Many legal actions, whether initiated by a union or an employer, turn on questions of fact. Employers can make plausible arguments for extensive discovery. In at least one case, an employer has used discovery procedures to force the union to disclose pro-union supporters within the workplace, the number of organizers working on the campaign, its organizing strategies, its organizing budget and the amount and kind of information it had collected regarding the employer. Unions, critics say, can ill-afford to have such information made known to employers, especially during an organizing campaign.
