= Fighting Times =

2022 labor organizer autobiography

- Author: Jon Melrod
- Subject: Autobiography / Political & Social Activists
- Publisher: PM Press
- Publication date: September 27, 2022
- Pages: 320
- ISBN: 978-1-629639-659

Fighting Times: Organizing on the Front Lines of the Class War is a 2022 autobiography of labor organizer Jon Melrod published by PM Press. It was recommended by a LaborNotes list of "Recent Books of Note for Labor Activists" and has been reviewed by a number of newspapers and magazines
