= Jane Slaughter =

Jane Slaughter may refer to:

- Jane Slaughter (journalist) (born 1949), American journalist
- Jane Slaughter (actor), English actress
