= Labor notes =

Labor notes may refer to:

- Labor Notes, a 20th-century labor organization and its eponymous magazine based in Detroit, Michigan
- Labour voucher, an alternative currency based on exchange of hours of labour
