= Jane Slaughter (journalist) =

American journalist (born 1949)

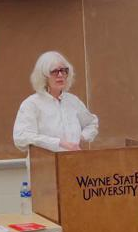
- Slaughter in 2019
- Born: January 9, 1949 (age 77); Scott Depot, West Virginia
- Education: American University
- Occupation: Co-Founder of Labor Notes
- Years active: 1970s–present
- Organization: Democratic Socialists of America
- Known for: Labor Organizing & Activism
- Notable work: Concessions and How To Beat Them (1983); Choosing Sides: Unions and the Team Concept (1988); Working Smart: A Union Guide to Participation Programs and Reengineering (1994); Secrets of a Successful Organizer (2016)

Jane Slaughter (born January 9, 1949) is an American journalist who writes frequently on labor affairs. Her writing has appeared in The Nation, The Progressive, Monthly Review, and In These Times. She is based in Detroit.

== Early life and education ==
Jane Slaughter was born in Scott Depot, West Virginia, in 1949. She moved to Washington, D.C. to study at American University. There, she became a member of the New American Movement and later joined the October League.

== Career ==
Slaughter joined the International Socialists and moved to Detroit to work in telecommunications. Shortly thereafter, she left her job to join the UAW at Chrysler, where she worked for several years. While working at Chrysler, she worked on the UAW's union newspaper. Finding the work enjoyable, she co-found the labor magazine Labor Notes, where she was an editor until retiring in 2014. Since then, she occasionally writes articles for the magazine.

== Publications ==
Slaughter is the author of Concessions and How to Beat Them and co-author, with Mike Parker, of Choosing Sides: Unions and the Team Concept and Working Smart: A Union Guide to Participation Programs and Reengineering. She is also the editor of Troublemaker's Handbook 2. Additionally, she co-wrote Secrets of a Successful Organizer with Alexandra Bradbury and Mark Brenner.

== Personal life ==
She is a member of the Democratic Socialists of America, and is part of that organization's Bread and Roses caucus.
