= Keith Griffin (economist) =

Keith B. Griffin
- Occupation: Economist

Keith B. Griffin (born 1938) is an economist, whose specialty is the economics of poverty reduction .

From 1979 to 1988 he was President of Magdalen College, Oxford, and he remains an honorary fellow there. During his presidency of Magdalen College, he and Senior Bursar R. W. Johnson worked to rescue the finances and buildings of the college, an effort described in Johnson's 2015 book Look Back in Laughter: Oxford's Postwar Golden Age. Griffin was the second American to ever serve as President of an Oxford college, and the youngest since World War II.

After serving as president, he chaired the department of Economics at the University of California's Riverside campus.

Griffin was born in Colon, Panama, and originally studied at Oxford at Balliol College as a Marshall Scholar after graduating from Williams College.

== Selected publications ==
- Keith Griffin (Editor); Mark D. Brenner; Keith Griffin; Takayoshi Kusago; Amy Ickowitz; Terry McKinley. Poverty Reduction in Mongolia. Asia Pacific Press (2003)
- Keith Griffin, The political economy of agrarian change: an essay on the green revolution. London / Basingstoke. Macmillan. 2nd edition 1979. 268 pages. (1st edition: 1974.)
- Keith Griffin, Alternative Strategies for Economic Development, New York, Macmillan, 1999, 269 pages

== Bibliography ==
- R.W. Johnson, Look Back in Laughter: Oxford's Postwar Golden Age, Threshold Press, 2015, ISBN 978-1903152355
