= Mark D. Brenner =

American writer and labor activist

- Born: Mark David Brenner; May 26, 1969 (age 57)

Academic background
- Education: Wake Forest University (BA); American University (MA); University of California, Riverside (MA, PhD)

Academic work
- Discipline: Labor studies
- Sub-discipline: Development studies Labour economics
- Institutions: University of Massachusetts Amherst; University of Oregon

Mark David Brenner (born May 26, 1969) is an American author, journalist, academic, and consultant who writes on labor and workplace issues. Brenner was formerly the co-director of Labor Notes and was previously a professor at the University of Massachusetts Amherst. He currently works at the Labor Research and Education Center at the University of Oregon.

== Education ==
Brenner earned Bachelor of Arts degree in economics and history from Wake Forest University, a Master of Arts in international development from the American University, and a Master of Arts and PhD in economics from the University of California, Riverside.

== Career ==
Brenner first became interested in the living wage issue when he was a graduate student in California and was part of a research team evaluating the Los Angeles living wage ordinance.

He specializes in development and labor economics, particularly with regard to poverty, income distribution and low-wage labor markets. He was a Fulbright scholar in 1998, working in Abidjan, Côte d'Ivoire. Brenner has consulted for the United Nations Development Programme and the International Labour Organization.

Brenner was a professor of economics at the University of Massachusetts Amherst and the Political Economy Research Institute. He left in September 2005 to join the staff of Labor Notes. Brenner spent several years working with living wage campaigns around the country, as well as playing a leading role in his union in Massachusetts. He currently covers Service Employees International Union (SEIU), teachers, higher education, and the living wage movement.

== Selected books and publications ==
- Mark D. Brenner and Terry McKinley. Rising wealth inequality and changing social structure in rural China, 1988-95. UNU World Institute for Development Economics Research (1999)
- Mark D. Brenner; Jeannette Wicks-Linn; Robert Pollin. Measuring the Impact of Living Wage Laws: A Critical Appraisal of David Neumark's How Living Wage Laws Affect Low-Wage Workers and Low-Income Families. Working Paper Series No. 43, Political Economy Research Institute (2002)
- Keith Griffin (Editor); Mark D. Brenner; Keith Griffin; Takayoshi Kusago; Amy Ickowitz; Terry McKinley. Poverty Reduction in Mongolia. Asia Pacific Press (2003)
- Mark D. Brenner. The Economic Impact of Living Wage Ordinances. Working Paper 80, Political Economy Research Institute (2004)
- Mark D. Brenner, Stephanie Luce. Living Wage Laws in Practice: The Boston, New Haven and Hartford experiences (2005)
- Robert Pollin; Mark Brenner; Jeannette Wicks-Lim; Stephanie Luce. A Measure of Fairness: The Economics of Living Wages and Minimum Wages in the United States ILR Press (2008)
