= American Dream (film) =

1990 American documentary

- DVD cover
- Directed by: Barbara Kopple; Co-directors: Cathy Caplan; Thomas Haneke; Lawrence Silk
- Produced by: Arthur Cohn; Barbara Kopple
- Cinematography: Kevin Keating; Hart Perry; Mathieu Roberts; Mark T. Peterson; Peter Gilbert
- Edited by: Cathy Caplan; Thomas Haneke; Lawrence Silk
- Music by: Michael Small
- Production companies: Cabin Creek; Catholic Communication Campaign; Channel Four Films
- Distributed by: Prestige Films
- Release date: October 6, 1990 (New York Film Festival)
- Running time: 100 minutes
- Countries: United States; United Kingdom
- Language: English
- Budget: $500,000 (estimated)
- Box office: $269,823 (United States)

American Dream is a 1990 American independent documentary film directed by Barbara Kopple and co-directed by Cathy Caplan, Thomas Haneke, and Lawrence Silk.

The film recounts the unsuccessful 1985–86 Hormel strike in the heartland of the United States against the Hormel Foods corporation.

== Synopsis ==
The film is centered on unionized meatpacking workers at Hormel Foods in Austin, Minnesota, between 1985 and 1986. Hormel had cut the hourly wage from $10.69 to $8.25 and cut benefits by 30 percent, despite posting a net profit of $30 million. The local union (P-9) opposed the cut, but the national union, the United Food and Commercial Workers, disagreed with their strategy.

The local union is shown hiring a freelance strike consultant, Ray Rogers, who comes in with charts, graphs and promises of a corporate campaign to draw national press attention. Rogers delivers in the short term, but it is not enough to defeat opposition from Hormel management and the UFCW international union.

Soon, despite the efforts of a seasoned negotiator, Lewie Anderson, sent by the parent union, the company has locked out the workers and hired replacement workers, leading to a series of violent conflicts amongst members of the community. The workers' resolve progressively fades as the battle extends into months and years, and the financial hardships they and their families suffer leads some to doubt the value of their efforts. Eventually, Hormel replaced nearly 80% (over 700 workers) of those who went on strike and leased half of its factory to a company that only paid $6.50.

Kopple, who had previously covered an extended miners' strike in the acclaimed Oscar-winning 1976 documentary Harlan County, USA, focuses on the personalities and emotions behind the strike, creating a highly charged portrait of labor that is sympathetic to the workers' distress without ignoring the strike's greater ambiguities.

American Dream features footage of union meetings and press releases, Hormel press releases, news broadcasts, and in-depth interviews with people on both sides of the issue, including Jesse Jackson.

== Exhibition ==
The film premiered at the New York Film Festival on October 6, 1990. In January 1991 it was screened at the Sundance Film Festival. On March 18, 1992, it opened in New York City.

== Reception ==
=== Critical response ===
Roger Ebert praised the documentary and its message, and he wrote, "This is the kind of movie you watch with horrified fascination, as families lose their incomes and homes, management plays macho hardball, and rights and wrongs grow hopelessly tangled...The people in this film are so real they make most movie characters look like inhabitants of the funny page."

The Austin Chronicle's film critic Marjorie Baumgarten also appreciated the film, and she wrote, "Kopple's Academy Award-winning documentary American Dream exposes the human cost of Reaganomics...What American Dream wants to learn is: how did this human tragedy happen—at Hormel of all places, a company with a reputation for progressivism? Decades ago it was among the first to furnish its workers with guaranteed annual wages and profit-sharing plans. Generations of family members worked at the plant, taking pride in their products and their relationship to the manufacturing process. The answer the movie presents is Reaganomics, the 'as long as I've got mine, the hell with everyone else' attitude prevalent in the 1980s".

The review aggregator Rotten Tomatoes reported that 100% of critics gave the film a positive review.

=== Awards ===
Wins

- Academy Awards: Oscar; Best Documentary, Barbara Kopple and Arthur Cohn; 1991.
- International Documentary Association: IDA Award; Barbara Kopple; 1991.
- Los Angeles Film Critics Association Awards: LAFCA Award; Best Documentary; 1991.
- Sundance Film Festival: Audience Award Documentary; Filmmakers Trophy Documentary; Grand Jury Prize Documentary; all for Barbara Kopple; 1991.
- Directors Guild of America: DGA Award; Outstanding Directorial Achievement in Documentary/Actuality; Barbara Kopple; 1992.
- National Society of Film Critics Awards: NSFC Award; Best Documentary; 1993.

Awards
Preceded by H-2 Worker	Sundance Grand Jury Prize: Documentary; 1991	Succeeded by A Brief History of Time
