= Organizing model =

Conception of how trade unions should operate

The organizing model, as the term refers to trade unions (and sometimes other social-movement organizations), is a broad conception of how those organizations should recruit, operate, and advance the interests of their members, though the specific functions of the model are more detailed and are discussed at length below. It typically involves many full-time organizers, who work by building up confidence and strong networks and leaders within the workforce, and by confrontational campaigns involving large numbers of union members. The organizing model is strongly linked to social movement unionism and community unionism. The organizing model contributes to the discussion of how trade unions can reverse the trend of declining membership, which they are experiencing in most industrial nations, and how they can recapture some of the political power, which the labor movement has lost over the past century.

The organizing model is frequently compared and contrasted with other methods of union organization, such as the servicing model. There is disagreement as to the logistics of applying the organizing model and whether it should focus on organizing existing members, recruiting new members, or both. The prominence of the model and the debate over its worth are seen primarily in the United States, Australia, and the United Kingdom.

== Definition ==
The principal aim of the organizing model is that of giving power directly to union members. The organizing model in its ideal type has these features:

- Strong emphasis on the importance of personal contact in organizing. Union officials are, according to Heery, Simms, Simpson, Delbridge, and Salmon, "paid", as opposed to being volunteers from the union itself. These are the same people who, had they been employing the service model in their union, would have been offering services to the members, but instead they focus their efforts on organizing the union members to act on their own behalf, rather than simply offering them services.
- To facilitate this type of organization, organizers will often put in long hours talking to workers about their situation, and what they believe the union can help them achieve. Visits to workers' homes will often be a component of this.
- Acceptance of the view that workers need to take some appreciable responsibility for winning union struggles and making the union strong.
- The identification and recruitment of volunteer leaders from among the workforce, to spread information about the union and encourage others to join and take action.
- Proactive recruitment drives conducted by either the paid organizers, the volunteers from the union, or both. The important part of the recruitment aspect of the organizing model is, according to Heery, Simms, Simpson, Delbridge, and Salmon, ensuring "the principle of 'like-recruits-like' such that the recruiters have the same demographic and occupational identity as those being recruited." Though, there can be unions that employ the organizing model without necessarily emphasizing recruitment.
- As a component of these recruitment drives, Heery, Simms, Simpson, Delbridge, and Salmon also discuss "mapping" of workplaces as a key component of the organizing model, and they also make it clear that the goal of mapping is to "...identify all members of the workplace and rank them systematically in terms of their propensity to become active in the union."
- Proactive campaigning, involving a large commitment of resources and large numbers of members. Heery, Simms, Simpson, Delbridge, and Salmon assert that this campaigning has to be focused on specific "issues and grievances", rather than campaigning without any specific, tangible goals in mind.
- Creative campaigning tactics – including demonstrations, street theatre, media stunts, direct action, civil disobedience, music etc.
- A conception of leadership in which leaders are those willing to take the initiative and contribute effort, rather than one based on authority. It is often the goal for leadership (as the confidence to initiate organization with others) will spread as broadly as possible.
- Heery, Simms, Simpson, Delbridge, and Salmon also offer "community support" as a key to the success of the organizing model. As a way to maintain or even incite this support from the community, Heery, Simms, Simpson, Delbridge, and Salmon suggest "publicising concessions from the employer".
- Typically a relatively high level of membership dues relative for industrial—as opposed to craft—unions.

== Organizing versus servicing ==
The development of the organizing model is as opposed to the servicing model, and there are various differences between the two models for union structure. Edmund Heery, Melanie Simms, Dave Simpson, Rick Delbridge, and John Salmon talk about how in the servicing model, "...the function of the union is to deliver collective and individual services to members who are dependent on the formal organization and its hierarchy of officers to provide what they require." Heery, Simms, Simpson, Delbridge, and Salmon state that the organizing model is different from the servicing model because it focuses instead on making union members feel "empowered", rather than alienated from the whole union process and environment.

Jack Fiorito states that the organizing model and the servicing model cannot be considered separate and there needs to be provision for using both models at the same time; Fiorito's research about British union members showed that "...a large number of responses express reservations about the OM or at least the organizing vs. servicing dichotomy suggested. Many of these responses emphasize the importance of service as an aid to organizing (18%) or something that is expected by the members (23%)." Fiorito believes that the organizing model and the servicing model are not mutually exclusive in some cases; there are some instances when the two models could be complementary. The debate over the organizing model versus the servicing model is widespread and multifaceted. Even the goals of the organizing model are debated and disagreed upon.

== Internal versus external ==
According to Bill Fletcher and Richard W. Hurd, unions that employ the organizing model often try to apply the above tactics in "internal", not just "external" campaigns. Indeed, many unions that employ the organizing model attempt to win a greater right to organize non-union workers through pressuring an employer through using current members' collective strength. Richard Hurd says that "Throughout the late 1980s the organizing model was used almost exclusively to apply to internal organizing;" however, "...by 1995 the organizing model concept was indiscriminately used to refer to both internal organizing to mobilize members and external organizing that promotes grassroots activism as a way to build support for union representation."

There is debate as to the proper role of the organizing model and whether it should focus on internal or on external applications. Bob Carter talks about the difference between internal organizing and external organizing in the context of the earliest British unions to use the organizing model. Carter says that "...despite the core message of the American model – that organization, rather than recruitment as such, was primary – officers were given individual recruitment targets...placing an emphasis not so much on the changing nature of unionism but simply on short-term recruitment." There is an apparent disconnect between employing the organizing model primarily for recruitment purposes and using the organizing model to facilitate better union conditions for pre-existing members of the union.

According to Fletcher and Hurd, exactly what constitutes internal organizing and what constitutes external organizing is unclear. Jack Fiorito offers an argument about internal vs. external organizing in the context of British unions. Fiorito says that external organizing is "...organizing in new areas...", while internal organizing is "...recruitment in sites where the union has recognition..." Fletcher and Hurd believe that the organizing model should be more focused on external, rather than internal, organizing, and they cite "Organizing Locals" as a good example of how that could be accomplished.

== History and context ==
Trade unions originally existed to organize their members democratically, and during their early growth, they typically put a strong emphasis on active recruitment and militant rank and file action, including strikes. By no means did they always unambiguously act in the interests of their members, but they were perceived as organizations that existed to struggle for collective action. Particularly since the end of World War II, however, the trade unions have tended more and more to act as service providers for their members: providing legal advice, training and so on; eschewing mass-based, militant action. During the '60s, '70s and onward, this trend deepened, with union density among the workforce falling all the while, until it could be measured at between 10% and 20% in many industrialized countries. In the context of this history, the organizing model is in principle not so much a new conception, as an attempt to recapture the essence of the labor movement.

The 1980s saw various attempts, in the United States, to compensate for falling union membership. Richard Hurd says that through the adoption of the "Organizing Institute" in the US, the organizing model was able to spread to other countries, as it "...served as a prototype for Australia's Organizing Works and Britain's Organizing Academy." Bob Carter explains the logistics how the organizing model spread across the world. Carter says that "After a visit to the US of the Australian Council of Trade Unions (ACTU), the influence of the organising approach spread to Australia and New Zealand and back to Britain via MSF." Carter asserts that the organizing model started in the US, went to Australia and New Zealand next, and then went to the UK. David Peetz and Barbara Pocock state that the ways these various countries implemented the organizing model were quite different, and the model looked slightly different based upon these minor discrepancies.

== History in the United States ==
According to Richard W. Hurd, the history of the organizing model in the US began from the failure of a "labor law" to be passed in the 1970s. In addition, Hurd explains that the 1980s were a very troubling time for unions in the US as a result of "the anti-union reign of Ronald Reagan" and "Twin recessions". Both of these factors contributed to the decline of union membership that so infamously characterized the labor movement in the US in the 1980s. In fact, Hurd says that, "The labor movement lost more than one-fifth of its private sector members during the first half of the 1980s." Therefore, US unions were forced to try some new tactics in the hopes of regaining the membership they were losing.

In response to this labor crisis, the AFL–CIO made many attempts to renew its labor movement in the 1980s, but none of them were successful. However, in 1988, an AFL–CIO-organized teleconference of trade unionists recognized the potential of the nascent organizing model, gave it its name, and resolved to spread it throughout the trade-union movement: this was an element in the model's popularization. After the teleconference, the AFL–CIO, according to Hurd, established the "Organizing Institute", and the goal of the institute was "to train union organizers." While, as Richard Hurd suggests, the attempts at reigniting the flame of union membership were largely unsuccessful, in 1995, former SEIU President John Sweeney was elected president of the AFL–CIO on the New Voice slate, on a platform of spreading the organizing model across the members of the federation. According to Richard Hurd, when Sweeney took over, he created an "Organizing Department" to enhance the strategy of employing the organizing model throughout the AFL–CIO, and he encouraged unions to begin "devoting 30% of their budgets to recruitment." The extent of the success of this is disputed, with some suggesting that more rhetoric has changed than anything, but it did have at least some effect. Richard Hurd suggests that "The reality is that the individual national unions determine their own resource allocations and develop their own organizing programs," but "Most unions have increased the funding of their organizing departments, and many have devoted substantial resources to the effort." This is how the AFL–CIO tried to implement the organizing model in response to the membership crisis.

In the mid-1980s, the SEIU union found itself in a similar state of crisis. A period of intense internal discussion gave rise to the view that a radical program was needed to rebuild the union and make it relevant to current and potential members. The Justice for Janitors campaign was launched as the organizational spearhead of the SEIU's attempt to reinvigorate their membership; beginning in Denver, Colorado, in 1985. In addition to the Justice for Janitors campaign, according to Jennifer Jihye Chun, around the same time, the SEIU also engaged in campaigns for "home care workers" in Los Angeles. Chun says that "Through a combination of aggressive grassroots organizing strategies, a focused political action campaign, and mass worker mobilizations, SEIU organizers were able to sign up 15,000 workers."

Working along the lines described above, the SEIU experienced huge growth in membership and a significant number of high-profile public victories for workers. (Though some proportion of the SEIU's membership growth has resulted from mergers, such as with 1199). The tactics and strategies of the SEIU and Justice for Janitors go beyond the organizing model which is, as has been described, an approach to local-level organizing and campaigning. It applies to a drive for the recruitment of members and leaders on the level of a firm or city. Other aspects of the SEIU's strategies are national or international. For instance, the drive to gain industry-wide coverage across a large geographical base – i.e., to organize janitors not only within one building but across a whole city, state and eventually all across the US – or the advocacy of union mergers.

== History in Australia ==
After a wave of massive industrial unrest and unprecedented increases in wages and conditions during the 1970s, the union movement became restrained in their demands, and part of the official apparatus of government during the ALP-led, neo-corporatist, Accord period (1983–96). According to Bob Carter and Rae Cooper, the ALP and the ACTU formed the "Accord" by establishing a formal "relationship" with each other While unions had amalgamated prior to the Accord, and the Australian Council of Trade Unions had itself absorbed other lesser peak industrial councils, the accord period and the later enterprise bargaining period encouraged mergers into super unions. These super unions often obliterated previous small union identities and loyalties (on both the "left" and "right" of the trade union movement) and created unions with a relatively artificial internal culture. Often the largest union in the merger imposed its internal culture on the other divisions of the new union. Additionally, during the period of mergers, the traditional links between members, local organisers, industrial officers, branches and the peak leaderships of unions broke down. This presented a challenge to the union movement. According to Bob Carter and Rae Cooper, the Accord period was very harmful to labor unions, and the super unions did not do anything drastic to improve the conditions of the unions.

Bob Carter and Rae Cooper state that the 1980s and 1990s were particularly bad decades for Australian unions. According to Carter and Cooper, the decline of union membership was worse, during the 1980s and the 1990s, in Australia than it was in the U.K. Carter and Cooper explain that the membership decline in Australian unions was the result of the "...pro-active anti-union approach..." by the "...conservative Coalition federal government...", along with other "...structural changes in the labor market." Peetz and Pocock state that during the 1980s and the 1990s, unions had to deal with "...outright hostility..." and "...successive pieces of legislation..." that were harmful to their membership and growth.

The response to this union crisis in Australia is the Organising Works program which was established in 1994 to recruit organizers from union members and university students. The Organizing Works Program, in Australia, was established after representatives from Australian unions visited the US and observed the organizing model in practice. Organising Works is a relatively unique program in Australia, in that it combines explicit training in trade unionism with an apprenticeship system with specific trade unions. Bob Carter and Rae Cooper state that Organizing Works was successful in spreading the message of the model and recruiting new members for unions, and in general, Australian unions were more committed to the organizing model than were British unions. David Peetz and Barbara Pocock state that in the first six years of the Organizing Works Program in Australia, "...it had produced over 300 trainees..." Carter and Cooper discuss the "Community and Public Sector Union (CPSU)" as one of the main Australian unions to implement the organizing model on a large scale in response to union decline. Peetz and Pocock talk about the "Unions@Work" report that was published for unions in 1999, which even continued the mission of the Organizing Works program. Peetz and Pocock emphasize that the organizing model was implemented differently in different Australian unions and that the aspects of the organizing model that got implemented differed by union.

== History in the UK and Ireland ==
According to Bob Carter and Rae Cooper, the U.K. went through several decades of uncertainty for unions. Specifically, conditions of the 1970s through the 1990s in the U.K. were particularly prone to hostile conditions for unions. Carter and Cooper state that British unions, like the "Trades Union Congress (TUC)" had to face "government hostility" and "job losses". In response to unfavorable conditions for unions, according to Carter and Cooper, the TUC tried implementing the "servicing" model, but it failed to provide measurable improvements in the labor movement or in "membership". According to Bob Carter, the "first major British union" to employ the organizing model was "Manufacturing, Science and Finance (MSF)", not necessarily the TUC. Bob Carter and Rae Cooper state that MSF was a combined union, which was formed from both the "Association of Scientific, Technical, Managerial, and Supervisory Staffs (ASTMS)" and the "Technical Advisory Staffs (TASS)." Bob Carter says that when ASTMS and TASS came together to form MSF, the merged organization more closely resembled ASTMS than TASS. According to Carter and Cooper, the history of the ASTMS showed that it was "...a much looser form of organization", while TASS was more "Communist." Carter states that MSF began implementing the "MSF policy Organising Works" in 1996. Carter makes the case that the MSF's implementation of the organizing model came after they tried "Reinforcement of a servicing culture...", which was, overall, not very successful. This is why they switched their strategy toward using the organizing model, rather than the servicing model. However, according to Carter, MSF had many problems arise in the wake of the model's adoption, such as the fact that "It was conceived and implemented from the top downwards... without wide discussion in the union." Carter sees this as a fundamental problem posed by the organizing model, and he thinks it must be overcome in order for it to be effective.

Carter states that the same time period also saw the "launch of the TUC's New Unionism project in 1996." Both unions, MSF and the TUC, were implementing new policies of employing the organizing model in an attempt to revitalize the conditions of their unions. The 1990s in the U.K. were especially geared toward experimentation and reorientation of the labor market toward being influential again. Carter and Cooper question how successful the New Unionism Project was in facilitating growth and organizing for unions. Carter and Cooper suggest that one of the main problems with the New Unionism was that it was too focused on negotiating with the "employer", rather than just focusing on the goals of the workers. Carter and Cooper state that the TUC had no real power over its "affiliates", except setting a good example and hoping that the affiliated unions follow their lead by implementing the organizing model.

The British Trades Union Congress (TUC) inaugurated an Organising Academy in 1998, to fulfill a similar role to that of the AFL-CIO's Organizing Institute in the US (or ACTU's Organising Works programme in Australia). Carter and Cooper question how successful the Academy was in spreading the organizing model because of the lack of "trainees" from some unions. Heery, Simms, Simpson, Delbridge, and Salmon state that, while the spread of the organizing model was the primary goal of the Academy, the Academy was actually dedicated to helping people traditionally underrepresented in the labor unions, such as "women" and the "young" or those with "non-standard" employment. While the graduates of the Academy have produced positive results, in general the model has not been implemented in the UK with the same comprehensive commitment as it has been by some unions in the US. Heery, Simms, Simpson, Delbridge, and Salmon state that U.K. unions are more likely to adopt the organizing model if they are or have been affiliated with "the Academy", so the Academy has had a measurable impact on the implementation of the organizing model within the U.K.

There are questions raised by writers on Industrial Relations about whether the transfer of the SEIU's organizing model has been faithful, or whether a watered down, less radical version has been instantiated. Sarah Oxenbridge, for example, writes "community organising and organising model methods provided the means by which Californian Unionists put their 'social movement unionism' philosophies and strategies into practice, on a daily basis (see Heery 1998). However, it may be that most British Trade Unionists will instead see the organising model as – more simply – a range of recruitment tactics, and will pick and choose from amongst these tactics." Heery, Simms, Simpson, Delbridge, and Salmon have isolated several aspects of the organizing model that are likely to appear in the U.K., namely "one-to-one recruitment", and "petitions, surveys and demonstrations". Heery Simms, Simpson, Delbridge, and Salmon emphasize that these are only some of the core aspects of the organizing model, not all of them. Heery, Simms, Simpson, Delbridge, and Salmon state that British unions are more likely to employ the organizing model, rather than the serving model, if they are bigger and more open to influence from "other countries".

According to Heery, Simms, Simpson, Delbridge, and Salmon, British unions are more likely to focus on the ideological basis for the organizing model, rather than the practical applications of it. Jack Fiorito states that the U.K.'s adaptation of the organizing model has some very specific characteristics that may or may not be seen in other countries. Fiorito lists "...less reliance on paid staff and much lower dues levels in U.K. unions..." as important features of the organizing model in the U.K. Fiorito did extensive research about the condition of British unions in the 2000s, which demonstrated that the organizing model was influential in British unions in the 2000s. When Fiorito interviewed U.K. union members during this timeframe, "Almost half of respondents (45%) volunteer that their union is adopting the OM," which is Fiorito's abbreviation for the organizing model. The organizing model was present in many British unions in the 2000s, and the workers were aware of its presence. The British union members largely felt that the organizing model was a good model to have implemented in their unions, and they were satisfied with its results. Fiorito states that "Although the OM varies somewhat in meaning, a strong majority of unionists feel that their union is truly committed to recruiting and organizing new members...".

The Irish general union SIPTU established an Organizing Unit in 2004 and its president, Jack O'Connor, set as his objective the transformation of SIPTU – hitherto firmly committed to a servicing agenda – into an organizing union. SIPTU is also seeking to learn from the experience of the SEIU. It remains to be seen how (and whether) a commitment to the organizing model of trade unionism can be reconciled with the union's traditional support for national 'Social Partnership'.

The Transport and General Workers Union (T&G) has begun to make some of the more serious moves of any of the larger British unions to learn from the SEIU's strategies – though some smaller unions (such as Community) have been applying the organizing model for some years. In 2005, the T&G launched a Justice for Cleaners campaign, which has been organizing workers in Canary Wharf, the Houses of Parliament, and, towards the end of the year, on the London Underground. In the former of these two, improvements in wages have been won by workers. The tactics of Social Movement Unionism have been utilized, insofar as the campaign organizers have worked closely with, for example, The East London Citizens Organisation (TELCO), which has brought in members of faith groups and other trade union branches. However, there remain concerns about the T&G's commitment to rank and file workers' action, considering how the union acted during the Gate Gourmet strike.

== Advantages ==
Heery, Simms, Simpson, Delbridge, and Salmon assert that the organizing model has several key advantages that distinguish it from the servicing model, such as the fact that the organizing model promotes "systematic", proactive, and well-thought out campaigns, which help the union's goals get satisfactorily and pragmatically achieved. More broadly, one of the obvious advantages of the organizing model is that it allows workers to actually be involved in the campaigns that most closely affect them, promoting both equity and equality. In addition, the organizing model, as opposed to the servicing model, provides for the union's future by broadening its support from the workers and giving them a sense of investment into the day-to-day functions of the union itself. Bob Carter and Rae Cooper, in their research about British trade unions and their use of the organizing model, state that, within the unions themselves, there was praise for the organizing model because it upheld the "...core role of trade unions". This is to say that the British union members felt the organizing model adhered to what unions should be doing in regard to their members.

== Disadvantages ==
=== Practical disadvantages ===
Heery, Simms, Simpson, Delbridge, and Salmon list several disadvantages of the union organizing model, with the most critical being that the model is very "resource-intensive", in terms of both people and money. Since the organizing model is, at its core, about people, rather than services, it cannot be effective without people to both implement it and carry it out. Heery, Simms, Simpson, Delbridge, and Salmon talk about "...instances of a lack of support or even opposition to organizing within unions." Because the organizing model is so dependent upon worker motivation and action, if the workers themselves oppose the implementation of the organizing model, it cannot be effective. Fletcher and Hurd suggest that even if members are not resistant to adoption of the organizing model, they still have to learn how to perform tasks previously handled by organizers, and there have to be enough active members to facilitate this kind of action. This clear dependence on the support and actions of the workers is a disadvantage of the organizing model, as opposed to the servicing model, which, for the most part, does not require worker support or demand worker action. According to Heery, Simms, Simpson, Delbridge, and Salmon, "Employers are often resistant." Unions that have to deal with this problem would very clearly have a hard time using the organizing model, as it could antagonize the employer even further and erode any previously existing relationship between the employer and the union.

Fletcher and Hurd state that unions may also face issues of resistance by pre-existing "staff", who may be hesitant or even suspicious at the adoption of the organizing model. Dealing with resistant staff would be a major disadvantage of using the organizing model, as opposed to the servicing model, to which the staff are both accustomed and familiar with. Fletcher and Hurd assert that, based on the fact that unions employing the organizing model have to reassign tasks and take time to train people, "...following the organizing model creates more work than sticking to the servicing model." Richard Hurd argues that the organizing model can, at times, create "...continual warfare..." between the workers and the employer, which is a disadvantage because there is a trend of workers "...preferring stability rather than on-going class struggle." If this is really the mindset of the workers, then it would be hard to actually maintain the organizing model for long periods of time. Fred Glass says that "...an organizing model of unionism requires an organizing model of labor communications" because the organizing model requires an effective way to share information with workers quickly and efficiently. Bob Carter, in regard to the organizing model in British unions, is concerned with the method of implementation and whether or not workers consent to switching from servicing to organizing. Carter says that "A model which is premised on debate and involvement cannot be successfully introduced without discussion..." Carter worries about whether or not workers are a part of the transition process and whether they consent to all of the implications that come with the organizing model.

=== Criticisms from the Left ===
Most practical criticism of the model has emerged as a criticism of the practice of the model by the SEIU and other organizing unions, especially in America. Criticisms from the left generally contrast (explicitly or not) the organizing model to a rank and file model, in which the confrontational style of organizing, and broad-based member involvement in campaigning is supplemented by broad-based member power. According to Bob Carter and Rae Cooper, the organizing model is not inherently "democratic". In the organizing model, the workers are not as active as they could be, and staff are still responsible for many aspects of union organizing. Carter and Cooper believe that the organizing model is rather limited in terms of its scale, and it cannot start a "...wider working class movement".

=== Criticisms from the Right ===
Critics argue that the organizing model is inappropriate to the task of unions in the modern global economy. They say that industrial disputes of the type that organising engenders are harmful to the national economies in which they occur: by increasing uncertainty and raising wages (labor costs), they will make economies less attractive to inward investment. Hence, working people will suffer in the long term, as the less investment, there is, the fewer jobs there will be. The conclusion of those who take this line is that unions should emphasize their service aspects, particularly those that contribute toward the well-being of the employer as well as the employee. In addition, there are the criticisms leveled by the anti-union Right, who often associate collective action with the tyranny of 'Big labor', contrasted to the free operation of the capitalist labor market.

== List of unions associated with the organizing model ==
Note: the organizing model is claimed by a very broad group of bodies, this list will be indicative only:

- Service and Food Workers Union Nga Ringa Tota, New Zealand
- Service Employees International Union (SEIU), US
- SIPTU, Ireland
- United Voice, Australia
- Unite Union, New Zealand
- UNITE-HERE, US

== See also ==
- Trade union
- Labour movement
- Services model
- Community unionism
- Social movement unionism
- Union organizer
