= Lucille Thornburgh =

American union organizer (1908–1998)

- Born: September 18, 1908; Strawberry Plains
- Died: November 7, 1998 (aged 90)
- Alma mater: Rhea County High School
- Occupation: Union organizer, newspaper editor

Lucille Thornburgh (September 18, 1908 – November 7, 1998) was an American labor organizer. Thornburgh was a union leader in Tennessee during the textile workers' strike of 1934 and worked for the American Federation of Labor in Knoxville for nearly thirty years. She also edited the East Tennessee Labor News for many years.

== Early life and education ==
Lucille Thornburgh was born on September 18, 1908, in Strawberry Plains, Tennessee. She grew up two miles away from Strawberry Plains, in Rolling Hills, Tennessee. She was one of six children of Thomas and Harriet Swaggerty Thornburgh. When Lucille was fourteen, her father sold his country store and farm and the family moved to Dayton, Tennessee.

She attended Rhea County High School and graduated in 1924, just one year before the Scopes Trial would make Dayton the focus of intense media coverage. The family moved to Knoxville shortly after her graduation; they struggled to make ends meet, and Lucille worked for three months at a nearby textile mill.

Thornburgh traveled across the country from 1926 to 1931, working in a variety of jobs including clerical work. She took courses at a local business college in Denver. In 1930 she moved to Detroit, but encountered difficulties in finding work due to the beginning of the Great Depression, so she returned to East Tennessee.

== Career and activism ==
Thornburgh was a winding machine operator at the Cherokee Spinning Company, working fifty-hour weeks for less than ten dollars per week. The "terrible conditions" she endured as a worker echoed that of other textile mill workers: cotton lint filled the air, and temperatures were stifling. Even when women achieved the skills necessary for higher-paying positions, they were not permitted to fill permanent positions. The mills were also a site of racial discrimination: Thornburgh described the mills as "snow-white." Thornburgh and six other employees unofficially organized the Cherokee mill in 1933 and presented the managers with a list of grievances. A walkout and picket line were established as part of the textile workers' strike of 1934, but the Cherokee mill strike failed after three weeks. Thornburgh and other union leaders were blacklisted.

Two federal acts in the early 1930s encouraged economic development and paved the way for the protection of workers' rights in East Tennessee, the Tennessee Valley Authority Act (establishing the Tennessee Valley Authority) and the National Industrial Recovery Act of 1933. Thornburgh obtained a job as a file clerk for the Tennessee Valley Authority (TVA), where she was a diligent employee.

Thornburgh's activities organizing for the American Federation of Labor (AFL) made her a minor target in anticommunist hearings during the 1940s and 1950s. Her name was listed as a suspected "red" during the 1942 House Un-American Activities Committee hearings. She was also mentioned as one of the TVA employees suspected as having communist or socialist tendencies during a Senate questioning of TVA Chair David E. Lilienthal. Thornburgh's FBI file concluded that she was not a communist but that she closely associated with Communist Party members who were also employees of TVA. She did not engage in union activism on the job, arguing that the TVA "could take care of itself," but volunteered as an organizer for bakery and laundry workers in Knoxville. She was elected as the vice president of the Tennessee Federation of Labor in 1937. Thornburgh was promoted and transferred to the TVA location near Wilson Dam in Alabama in 1939, but returned to Knoxville in 1942. Later in 1942 she took a position with the Department of War in Fort Belvoir, but resigned soon after, disliking the regimented nature of military life.

She took a position with the American Federation of Labor in 1943. After the end of World War II, she settled into life as an AFL labor organizer and associate editor of the Knoxville Labor News (later renamed the East Tennessee Labor News). Thornburgh faced gender discrimination from the local labor councils, who she said were unwilling to pay her more than the managing editor, even though she did the majority of the work on the paper. She also faced pressure to reign in her radicalism from the more conservative Knoxville Labor Council. She was finally recognized as the primary editor on the masthead in 1962. When she retired in 1972, she had no pension from the AFL, even though she had worked for the organization for over thirty years.

Thornburgh received a scholarship in 1947 to study labor and economic issues for a year at Ruskin College, learning more about the British trade union movement. She served on the board of the Highlander Folk School, but when the school became well known for its civil rights activism, the AFL forced her to choose between labor unionism and her role at the school. She participated in efforts to integrate Knoxville's lunch counters and restaurants.

In 1970, the East Tennessee Labor News shut down its presses in response to Tennessee's politics becoming more conservative. While continuing to support labor efforts, Thornburgh also fought for services for the elderly on the National Council of Senior Citizens and the Knoxville Community Action Committee. In her seventies she helped organize Solutions to Issues of Concern to Knoxvillians, campaigning for health care for the indigent and lobbying for state tax reform. The Knoxville Community Action Committee named her the Knox County Senior Citizen of the Year in 1982 for her efforts. The week before her death, Knoxville's Metro Pulse newspaper named Thornburgh one of the 100 most influential Knoxvillians of the 20th century.

Thornburgh died in Knoxville on November 7, 1998. She was buried in the cemetery at Pleasant Grove Piney Baptist Church in Jefferson County, Tennessee.
