= Union organizer =

Specific type of trade union member (often elected) or an appointed union official

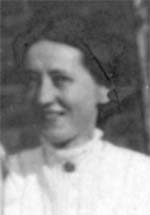
Leonora O'Reilly, a trade union organizer and founding member of the Women's Trade Union League

A union organizer (or union organiser in Commonwealth spelling) is a specific type of trade union member (often elected) or an appointed union official.

In some unions, the organizer's role is to recruit groups of workers under the organizing model. In other unions, the organizer's role is largely that of servicing members and enforcing work rules, similar to the role of a shop steward. In some unions, organizers may also take on industrial/legal roles such as making representations before Fair Work Commission, tribunals, or courts.

In North America, a union organizer is a union representative who "organizes" or unionizes non-union companies or worksites. Organizers primarily exist to assist non-union workers in forming chapters of locals, usually by leading them in their efforts.

== Methodology ==
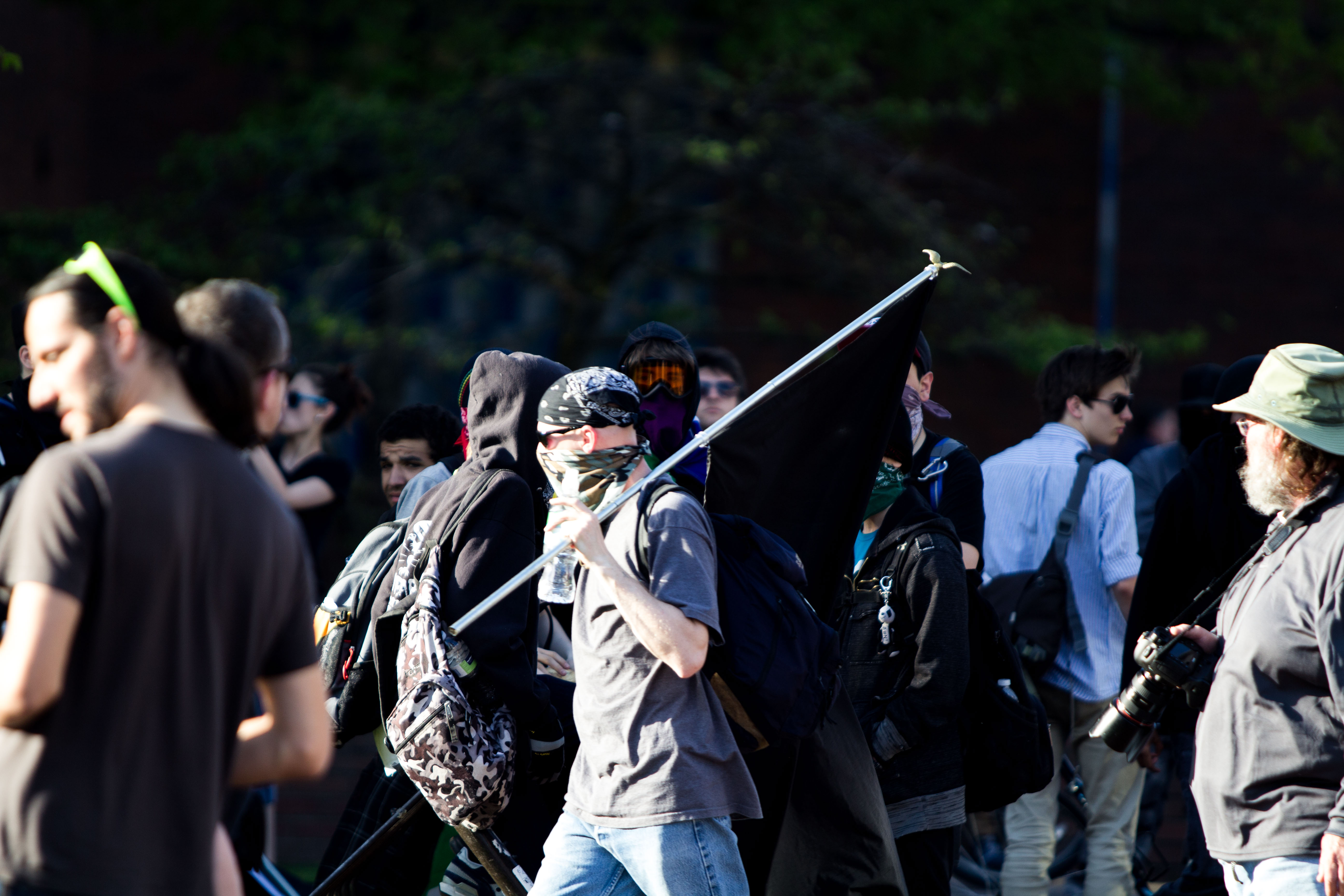
Organizers in Portland marching on May Day

Organizers employ various methods to secure recognition by the employer as being a legitimate union, the ultimate goal being a collective bargaining agreement. The methods can be classified as being either top-down organizing or bottom-up organizing.

Top-down organizing focuses on persuading management through salesmanship or pressure tactics. The salesmanship may include offering access to resources such as to a well-trained and skilled supply of labor or access to union cartels. Pressure tactics may include picketing with the intention of embarrassing management or disrupting business, as well as assisting the government in investigating employment law and labor law violations. A strict enforcement of these laws might result in fines and might serve to hurt the violator's chances in a competitive bidding process. Top-down organizing is generally considered easier than bottom-up and is practiced more in the construction industry.

Bottom-up organizing focuses on the workers and usually involves a certification process, normally overseen by a labor relations board such as the NLRB in the U.S. The process entails either a secret ballot election or, in some cases, a card-signing effort (called card check). In either case, should a majority of the employees agree to union representation, the results bind the company to recognize and negotiate with the union. Normally, both sides are given a chance to campaign for or against unionization, though management has a decided advantage due to their greater access to the employees, as well as management's inherent ability to discipline or terminate employees. It is in this electioneering model where the organizer really organizes: arranging meetings, devising strategy, and developing an internal structure known as an organizing committee. It is from the pool of activists recruited to the organizing committee that the union typically later draws its shop stewards. Though some mistake organizing as strictly being a recruitment effort, numerous obstacles emerge which require more than simple enlistment and promotion of the union.

In most countries, laws such as the U.S. National Labor Relations Act, guarantee the rights of workers to seek union membership and forbid management's use of undue influence such as bribes or threats. Nonetheless, such charges are hard to prove and the labor movement believes the entire process to be slanted against them in enforcement and interpretation of labor laws. Sometimes, organizing involves legal wrangling over issues such as voter eligibility. In such cases, issues are often settled by appeal to the Labor Board who serves, essentially, as a referee during the process. Intrigue during heated campaigns is not uncommon. In various cases, one or both sides have used spying and information-gathering techniques tantamount to industrial espionage.

== Cause within a cause ==
Within the labor movement, organizing is the cause within the cause. In most industrialized nations, there has been a steady decline in union membership and in the influence of organized labor since the 1950s. A response to this decline has been a renewed organizing effort. The heads of unions are well aware of the problem. In the U.S., many labor activists have blamed John Sweeney, the former (1995–2009) President of the AFL–CIO, for not doing enough to organize. In fact, this has been cited as the genesis of the split within the American labor movement that led to the formation of the Change to Win Federation (a rival umbrella organization of North American unions set up as an alternative to the AFL–CIO in 2005), by Change to Win advocates at least. Many unions see organizing as a way to ensure the future of their organization. Unions who emphasize organizing and are expansionist are said to have the "organizing model." By contrast, other unions are said to have the "servicing model," spending most of their resources on providing services to the existing membership (i.e., non-expansionist).

== Controversies ==
Within the labor movement, there is some resistance to organizing, though more in deed than in word. Organizing can be seen as a drain on scarce resources with insignificant returns and with results tenuous. In transient industries such as construction, an increase in the supply of labor from newly organized shops may cause the supply of jobs to dwindle below what an increased membership can absorb.

Most disputes between unions are jurisdictional (territorial). Union jurisdiction is based on geographic scope, craft, industry, historical claim, and compromise. Unions have overlapping jurisdictions. Critics within the labor movement have blamed the movement itself for the fractious effects of union-on-union competition and perceived issues of raiding. Expansionism and the scramble for members in organizing programs bring to light these border issues.

Opponents of organizing, mainly in management and business, argue that unionization divides employees against their employer and results in increased costs. Such accusations are not entirely without foundation: Indeed, a successful organizing campaign usually demonstrably benefits the labor at the expense of management. Critics will often circulate horror stories about plant closures and retaliatory firings to discourage union activity and uptake among the workers. Real or imagined, such horror stories are taken as warnings and have a chilling effect on voting. Though illegal, retaliatory terminations remain a problem for organizers to overcome. Fear is the leading obstacle to organizing.

== Counter organizing ==
In bottom-up organizing, management and labor are pitted against each other and management often schedules retaliatory, aggressive tactics in an effort to break the chapter, called "union-busting." The intention of such union-busting may be to "nip it in the bud" before getting locked into a costly collective bargaining agreement. Management may feel that the organizing campaign encourages and capitalizes upon worker disobedience and perceived disloyalty. For this reason, management may hire anti-union consultants or lawyers known as "union-busters" or "union avoidance consultants." With the goal of thwarting organizing, union-busters typically have a two-pronged approach: firstly, management will cut deals with individual workers to betray the union and secondly, to exploit loopholes in labor law in an effort to derail or sandbag the election process. The emergence of union-busting as an industry is a relatively new phenomenon and is described in Martin Levitt's book Confessions of A Union Buster. Prior to the emergence of the union-avoidance industry, practitioners were mainly "goon squads" also used for strike-breaking. In the U.S., the largest and most well-known "goon squad" for hire was the Pinkerton Detective Agency, still active today, though in a different capacity. William W. Delaney's "My Father Was Killed By Pinkerton Men" is a song about the violence that often surrounded early American labor strife.

== Organizing in popular culture ==
The most famous movie about organizing is the 1979 factually based film Norma Rae, the story of a Jewish organizer from New York City who came to the American South to organize a textile mill. He recruits Norma Rae, played by Sally Field. Norma becomes a key union activist who defies management at great personal risk.

The 1987 production of Matewan is another factually based story of an organizer who visits a small mining town in West Virginia and who is able to unite rival ethnic groups against a common enemy: the company.

Both of these stories feature outsiders entering rural company towns and stirring workers up against exploitative management. This is a common theme in organizing. The workers are cast as simple commoners being oppressed by powerful managers cast in the role of villains. The organizer is portrayed as a liberator. There is some truth in these stories since companies did, in fact, historically hire armed thugs to break up organizing drives through unethical and oppressive means. Modern unions work within the existing system, rather than against it, through sophisticated political action programs. Most unions have reinvented themselves as streamlined, professional machines.

10,000 Black Men Named George, released in 2002, is a movie based on the true story of A. Philip Randolph, the famous black organizer who organized the railroad company's largely black Pullman Porters.

The film Bread and Roses (2001) depicts the Service Employees International Union's "Justice for Janitors" campaign to organize cleaners. The story is also a love story between an idealistic young organizer and a female Hispanic immigrant among those he is organizing.

Both of these stories incorporate pro-union messages with ethnic determination. In the case of the Pullman Porters, Randolph is remembered as a civil rights hero. The Justice for Janitors campaign is about immigrants' rights, as many of the organized janitors are from Spanish-speaking or Slavic countries. The status of the characters as minorities paints a picture of them as being outside of, or on the margins of, the American Dream, thus further casting workers and activists as underdogs. The underdog theme is an inspirational archetype in myth.

In the 2005 action movie Four Brothers, one of the characters is a former union activist who turns the bad guy's henchmen against him by informally organizing them against their boss based on the common organizing themes of a greater share in the profits and respect on the job.

In the 1997 action movie Grosse Pointe Blank, Dan Aykroyd's villainous character pursues fellow assassin John Cusack in order to include him in a ridiculous assassins' union.

These latter two movies use organizing as a plot device, though they involve black market businesses and are far-fetched for this reason. Nonetheless, they demonstrate how, absent a union's presence, the same issues arise in any vocation. Also, both of the movies take place in the Detroit, Michigan area, a city which has produced some great organizers.

The 1992 production Hoffa, starring Jack Nicholson as famed labor leader Jimmy Hoffa of the Teamsters, begins the story where Hoffa's career began: organizing truck drivers and warehouse workers in and around Detroit. Jimmy Hoffa went on to become one of the most powerful labor leaders in U.S. history.

The 1978 movie F.I.S.T, tells the same story of Hoffa's beginnings as an organizer and of his rise to power, albeit with more liberties taken. Sylvester Stallone plays Hoffa as a man with good intentions, dogged on all sides, and by both sides of the law.

Both Hoffa stories feature Hoffa as a tough "man of the people" and chronicle how his organizing swelled the ranks of the Teamsters. Hoffa was notorious for taking an "ends justifies the means" approach to organizing. Hoffa's legacy remains: his son, James P. Hoffa, was the general president of the Teamsters until 2022.

In an episode of the popular American sit-com The Office, the characters hold an organizing meeting that ends with a manager threatening to fire everyone involved. The character played by comedian Patrice O'Neal tells the boss, "This isn't over."

The Fred Savage sitcom Working had an episode where the main character organizes his fellow workers into a union and tells management it is because he really cares about the well-being of his coworkers, exhibiting solidarity.

The song "Solidarity Forever" by Ralph Chaplin has become the anthem of large parts of the labor movement such as those in North America.

== See also ==
- Battle of the Overpass
- Collective bargaining
- Employee Free Choice Act
- Labor history
- Labor rights
- Labor spies
- Labor Unions in the United States
- NLRB election procedures
- Newsies
- Right to assemble
- Strike action
- Union violence
- Union violence in the United States

=== People ===
- Luigi Antonini
- Harry Van Arsdale, Jr.
- Leon E. Bates
- Yolanda Bejarano
- John Brophy
- Cesar Chavez
- Patrick Crowley
- Johnny Dio
- Allen Dorfman
- Samuel Gompers
- Joe Hill
- Sidney Hillman
- James Hoffa
- Mary Harris "Mother" Jones
- John L. Lewis
- Charles O'Brien
- A. Philip Randolph
- Walter P. Reuther
- Fannie Sellins
- Frank Sheeran
- Crystal Lee Sutton ("Norma Rae")
- R. J. Thomas
- Lucille Thornburgh
- Leonard Woodcock
