= Peter Rachleff =

American historian

Peter J. Rachleff is Co-Executive Director of the East Side Freedom Library, and a retired professor of history at Macalester College in the St. Paul, Minnesota specializing in United States labor, immigration and African American history. Rachleff received his B.A. in Sociology at Amherst College in 1973 and M.A. and Ph.D. in history at the University of Pittsburgh in 1981. At Pittsburgh, he studied under foremost labor-historian David Montgomery. He is the author of internationally recognized academic monographs, and contributor to The Nation, International Socialist Review, Dissent, Z Magazine, and Dollars and Sense, among other publications. He is also a member of the Democratic Socialists of America.
