= Kim Moody =

American writer on labor (born 1940)

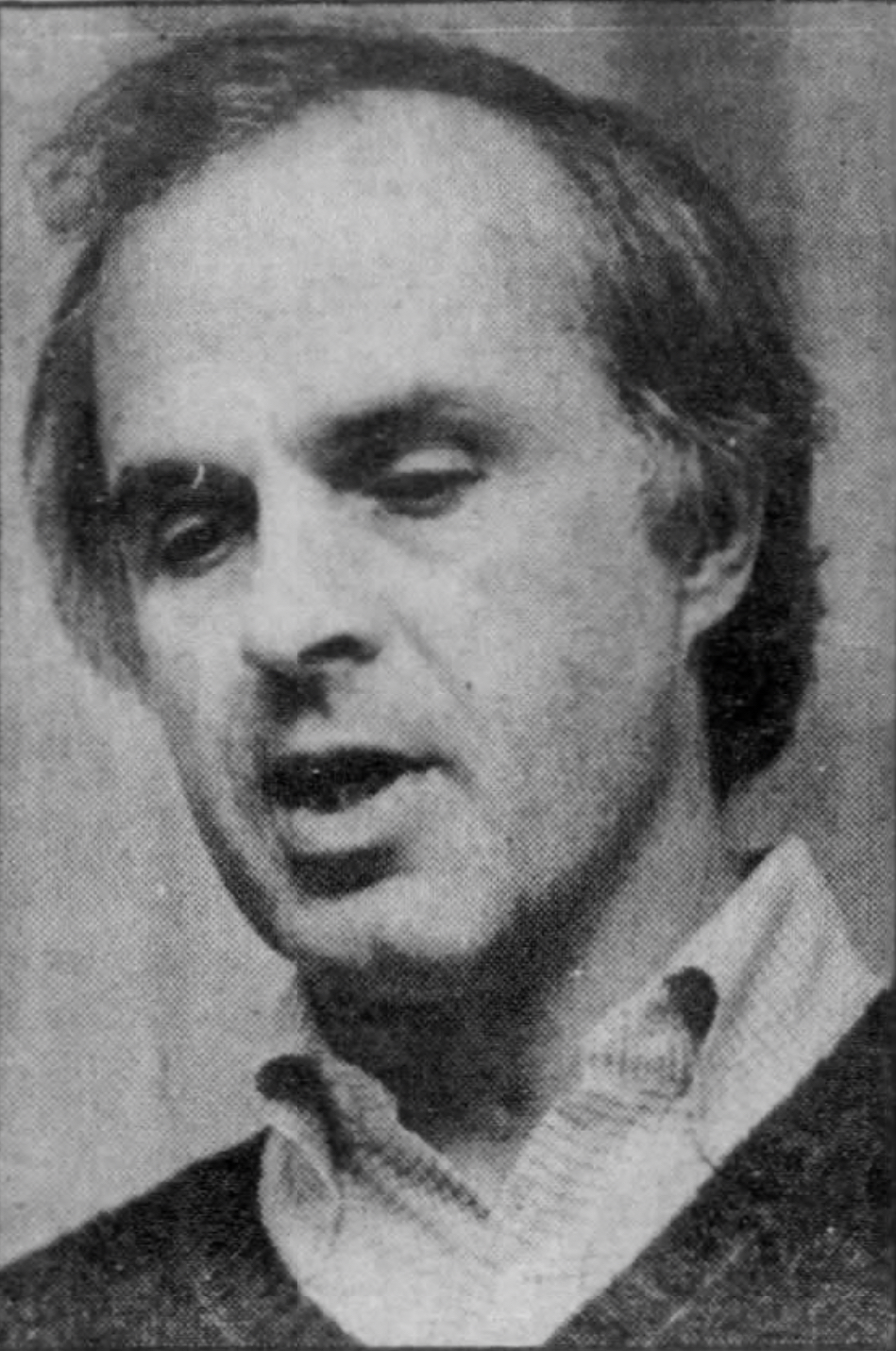
- Moody in 1987
- Born: 1940 (age 85–86)
- Occupations: Writer; activist
- Movement: Social movement unionism; socialism

Kim Moody (born 1940) is an American socialist activist and writer on labor who advocates social movement unionism, a revitalized labor movement of mobilized and militant rank-and-file workers, rather than business unionism, structured from the top down and compromised by coziness with corporations.

== Activity ==
In the early 1960s, Moody was a member of the Students for a Democratic Society (SDS) in Baltimore, Maryland, writing an SDS position paper on "Organizing Poor Whites" for the organization's Economic Research and Action Project. He was part of the Independent Socialist Clubs and International Socialists, writing articles and pamphlets on labor.

From 1979 to 2001, Moody served on the staff of Labor Notes magazine in Detroit, which he helped to found in 1979.

He now resides in the UK, where he is a senior research fellow at the University of Hertfordshire.

== Books ==
- An Injury to All: The Decline of American Unionism (Verso, 1988)
- Unions and Free Trade: Solidarity vs Competition (Labor Notes, 1992)
- Workers in a Lean World: Unions in the International Economy (Verso, 1997)
- From Welfare to Real Estate: Regime Change in New York City, 1974 to the Present (New Press, 2007)
- U.S. Labor in Trouble and Transition (Verso, 2007)
- In Solidarity: Essays on Working-Class Organization in the United States (Haymarket Books, 2014)
- On New Terrain: How Capital Is Reshaping the Battleground of Class War (Haymarket Books, 2017)
- Tramps and Trade Union Travelers: Internal Migration and Organized Labor in Gilded Age America, 1870-1900 (Haymarket Books, 2019)
- Breaking the Impasse: Electoral Politics, Mass Action, and the New Socialist Movement in the United States (Haymarket Books, 2022)
