= Ideas and Action =

Ideas and Action is an anarcho-syndicalist journal that was founded in 1981 as a result of numerous conferences organized by the New York Metropolitan area Libertarian Workers' Group and the Syndicalist Alliance of Milwaukee. In 1984, the newly formed Workers Solidarity Alliance took over publication of the journal.

Publication of Ideas and Action was suspended after issue #17 (1997). In 2010, an online version of the publication was launched and continues to publish new material.
