= Business unionism =

Type of trade union

A business union is a type of trade union that is opposed to class or revolutionary unionism and has the principle that unions should be run like businesses.

Business unions are believed to be of American origin, and the term has been applied in particular to phenomena characteristic of American unions. This idea originated over the court's difficulty when regulating worker's industrial rights, specifically in the decades after the Civil War. The origin of the term "business unionism" is contested. Michael Goldfield (1987) notes that the term was in common usage before Hoxie was published in 1915.

According to Goldfield, Hoxie used the term to describe trade-consciousness, rather than class-consciousness; in other words, according to Hoxie, business unionists were advocates of "pure and simple" trade unionism, as opposed to class or revolutionary unionism. This sort of business unionism is what Eugene Debs often referred to as the "old unionism".

== Characteristics ==
=== Internal organization ===
One major characteristic of "business unionism" is the principle that unions should be run like businesses. These unions would be organized as top-down hierarchies, with dedicated employees paid in a stratified way. Business unionism typically features a centralized structure, where union representatives independently manage negotiations and other functions, with less direct involvement from the rank and file. Union representatives often play a key role within this structure, representing union workers in negotiations.

According to this model, the main 'battleground' for organized labour moves from the shop floor to the boardroom, where well-paid business leaders of the union negotiate with well-paid bosses of the company.

=== Craft unionism ===
The members of a union's identity is defined by their craft. Craftsmen involved in the metal and building trades did help set a positive image for their companies. They feel solidarity towards their fellow co-workers as opposed to the greater working class. The unions adopt an exclusive policy as opposed to an inclusive one. This can cause a fragmentation of workers. The unions are more inclined to fight against reorganization of work by their employers. Business unions are sometimes not inclined to expand their membership and organize outside workers. Union leaders shared a form of populism that spoke to three key groups of people-- patriotic producers, wage earners, and guardians of basic rights.

=== Economic interests ===
The unions only view their goal to protect immediate economic interests. These economic interests are restricted to getting higher wages, better working conditions, and job security. "In other words, the horizon of union action is straight-forward and short-term: to produce constant and immediate improvements in the material conditions of union members' lives." Business unions also do not seek worker input into technological changes that change the structure of the companies that employ workers. The result is an intense focus on the collective bargaining process, conducted according to rigid specifications.

This outlook can be contrasted with social unionism, a union movement that seeks to improve life overall for workers—for example by struggling against racial discrimination in the workplace.

=== Rights vs. powers ===
Centrally-controlled business unions tend to advocate for workers' "rights", a set of enumerated conditions to which workers are entitled. Large federations felt it was crucial to appeal to all citizens in general who believed in "equal rights" and were held in jeopardy by corrupt administrators. If these rights are violated, the worker may begin a process of complaints that ultimately yields compensation. A consequence of this outlook is that instead of simply organizing and demanding power on the shop floor, workers follow a pre-determined system that does not allow major changes in the workplace.

=== Source of workers' problems ===
Business unions often attribute workers' issues to employer practices in resource distribution rather than systemic factors. They also blame the unfair distribution of the surplus through the work process. They are not radical in their outlook and do not blame the capitalist system as a whole for these problems. They also do not believe in a radical change to the system. Business unionists generally aim to negotiate for fair distribution and address inequality within existing structures.

=== Politics ===
Business unionism is also viewed as being non-partisan, although members tend to be "liberal" politically. It is believed that to adopt political allegiances would divide union members. The unions would make political allegiances based on pragmatism, supporting different parties on an issue-by-issue basis, but refusing to offer permanent allegiances.

There is a tendency to think business unionism is automatically non-militant but that is not true. Business unions may use negotiations, strikes, or other methods to achieve results for members. However, business unions use strikes and direct actions differently than social unions. Business unions tend to only use strikes to exert and maintain their bargaining position. Business unions often seek cooperative approaches with management, viewing stable employer-employee relations as beneficial.

== Examples of business unions ==
=== Canada ===
- Unifor
- Trades and Labour Congress of Canada
- Canadian Federation of Labour (1982) –

In 1982 a group of construction unions covering approximately 200000 members united to form a new Canadian Federation of Labour. These unions had been suspended from the Canadian Labour Congress (CLC) for nonpayment of per capita tax. The two bodies differed on matters of representation at CLC conventions, dual unionism and the CLC standard that Canadian officers of affiliated unions be elected by the Canadian membership. The CFL philosophy is summed up in the statement of its president, James McCambly: "We are committed to leaving politics to the politicians and to concentrating on being effective representatives of labour's interest within the political system." By 1996 CFL membership had shrunk to 140000 as some of its affiliates rejoined the CLC. In 1997 merger discussions were taking place between the two labour centrals.

- Christian Labour Association of Canada
- Seafarers' International Union of Canada

=== United States ===
- American Federation of Labor

== See also ==
- Company union
- Labor aristocracy
- Labor federation competition in the United States
- One Big Union (concept)
