= Ray Rogers (labor activist) =

American labor activist (born 1944)

Ray Rogers (born March 31, 1944, in Beverly, Massachusetts) is an American labor rights activist, labor union strategist and organizer as well as a major figure of prominence in the American labor and human rights movement. Rogers is credited with pioneering the strategy of the "corporate campaign", a tactic that has been used with success by labor unions, human rights advocates and environmental activist groups in their battles against corporations in the United States and all over the world.

== The Corporate Campaign ==
As developed by Rogers, the corporate campaign incorporates specialized research and a power analysis of a targeted company's corporate, financial and political ties, to design specific strategies and tactics that increase economic and political pressure on the company, its top executives, directors and those institutions that can influence them. Often, the corporate campaign will focus on individual parts of a company (i.e. its directors, executives, creditors, shareholders and other funding sources) as well as urge widespread boycotts of the company's products.

The ultimate goal of the corporate campaign is to force the targeted company to change its behavior and act responsibly going forward. In some cases, that would require the targeted company to recognize the rights of its workers and their union; or, to stop polluting and clean up contaminated land; and, in certain cases, to make restitution to the victims, their families and communities. Rogers's battles on behalf of labor union members against companies such as J.P. Stevens & Co., Geo. A. Hormel & Co. (see 1985–86 Hormel strike), International Paper Co., American Airlines, Inc., Campbell Soup Co. and Coca-Cola Co. led BusinessWeek magazine to describe him as a "legendary union activist".

Rogers also has successfully adapted a corporate campaign approach to public sector battles between government workers' unions and politicians and government leaders, who often will target or attempt to scapegoat public sector unions. Rogers's groundbreaking campaign on behalf of New York City transit workers in 1999, for example, resulted in a new contract for employees, giving them what The New York Times called "the largest annual raises received by any of New York City's public-employee unions in more than a decade."

Rogers also is the founder and director of New York City-based Corporate Campaign Inc. (CCI), which has championed labor, human rights and environmental causes for the past three decades.

== Killer Coke Campaign ==
Rogers has directed the Campaign to Stop Killer Coke since the campaign was launched in 2003. The Killer Coke Campaign is trying to hold the Coca-Cola Company, its bottlers and subsidiaries accountable for numerous acts of violence, including the kidnapping, torture and murder of union leaders and members of their families, in Coca-Cola bottling factories in Colombia and Guatemala. The campaign is "the largest anticorporate campaign since the one against Nike."

Under the campaign, more than 60 colleges and universities in the United States and from around the world have either terminated their purchase contracts with the Coca-Cola Co., or removed company products from their campuses altogether. More than 45 Labor unions, in the U.S. and other countries, have announced their support of the Campaign to Stop Killer Coke. And in July 2006, KLD removed Coca-Cola from its Broad Market Social Index (BMSI), which then led the Teachers Insurance and Annuity Association-College Retirement Equities Fund (TIAA-CREF) to remove the stock from the CREF Social Choice Account, one of the nation's largest socially responsible investing funds.

== See also ==
- American Dream (1990) a cinéma vérité documentary film directed by Barbara Kopple that, among other things, illustrate Ray Rogers's organizing work and tactics used. Nevertheless, the union lost their battle against the company.
- The Coca-Cola Case (2009) is a feature-length documentary film by Carmen Garcia and Germán Gutiérrez, co-produced by the National Film Board of Canada, about the legal fight and corporate campaign to hold the Coca-Cola Co. responsible for anti-union violence at the company's bottling plants in Colombia and other countries.
