= Service model =

The service model (or servicing model) generally describes an approach whereby labour unions aim to satisfy members' demands for resolving grievances and securing benefits through methods other than direct grassroots-oriented pressure on employers. It is often contrasted to the organising model, and to rank and file organization.

== Australia ==
In Australia, this model was encouraged through a comprehensive mechanism of centralised wage fixing and an industrial arbitration system. This system was particularly reliant on closed shops, and the ability of unions to obtain preference of employment for their members. In 1987 the Australian Council of Trade Unions (ACTU) adopted a "Future Strategies" document. The aim of this document and the underlying strategy was to encourage union rationalisation and thereby larger, more efficient unions that were more able to "service" their members' needs. This was further endorsed by the "Organisation Of Resources And Services Of The Trade Union Movement Policy" adopted in the 1991 congress. Both of these strategies were aimed at improving the delivery of services to members, which was seen as necessary to halt membership declines during this period.

The period following the 1987 congress saw significant shifts in the Australian industrial relations landscape including:

- an end to closed shop arrangements that were sanctioned by legislation
- prohibition of secondary boycotts
- a move to decentralise the award system through enterprise based bargaining.

These changes made it increasingly difficult to retain union membership numbers and density by applying a purely servicing model.

Furthermore, the change that was brought about by the Workplace Relations Act 1996 curtailed the power of the Australian Industrial Relations Commission to resolve disputes by arbitration. This meant that in many cases the Australian Arbitration system was no longer available to resolve disputes, particularly where what was sought by workers was an increase in wages and conditions in excess of a centrally-fixed, minimum wage "safety net". For the first time since Australian federation industrial action was sanctioned by federal legislation in certain defined circumstances. This meant that the bargaining strength of the respective industrial parties became a primary determinant of the outcome, and their ability to organise became crucial.

At Congress 2000, the unions adopted the "21st Century Organising and Campaigning Policy" which effectively gave formal recognition to the growing need to focus on actively organising workers to encourage membership growth, or adopt an organising model. This change also reflected the need to change to succeed in a decentralised bargaining context. While there is considerable controversy amongst unions about what constitutes a servicing or organising model, most Australian union structures incorporate a combination of both strategies to varying degrees.

The distinction between servicing and organising is not unique to the Australian Union movement. The discussion between various models is also prominent in other countries such as the United States.
