= Dollars & Sense =

American magazine

Coordinates: 42°21′24.18″N 71°3′30.82″W

- January/February 2006 cover
- Frequency: Bimonthly
- Circulation: 7,000
- Publisher: Economic Affairs Bureau, Inc.
- Founded: 1974
- Country: U.S.
- Based in: Portsmouth, New Hampshire, U.S.
- Language: English
- Website: dollarsandsense.org
- ISSN: 0012-5245
- OCLC: 1185225

Dollars & Sense is a magazine focusing on economics from a progressive perspective, published by Dollars & Sense, Inc, which also publishes textbooks in the same genre.

Dollars & Sense describes itself as publishing "economic news and analysis, reports on economic justice activism, primers on economic topics, and critiques of the mainstream media's coverage of the economy."

Published since 1974 (it was originally a monthly; now it is bimonthly), it is edited by a collective of economists, journalists, and activists committed to the ideals of social justice and economic democracy.

It was initially sponsored by the Union for Radical Political Economics, but it is no longer affiliated with that organization. Today, the magazine is published by the independent Economic Affairs Bureau, Inc., a 501(c)(3) non-profit corporation based in Boston. Circulation is about 7,000.

The magazine is aimed at academics, students, and activists in the economic justice, social justice and labor movements.
