= Social movement unionism =

Trend in contemporary trade unionism

Social movement unionism (SMU) is a trend of theory and practice in contemporary trade unionism. Strongly associated with the labour movements of developing countries, social movement unionism is distinct from many other models of trade unionism because it concerns itself with more than organizing workers around workplace issues, pay and terms and conditions. It engages in wider political struggles for human rights, social justice and democracy. Social movement unionism grew out of political struggles in developing countries and was theorized as a distinct industrial relations model in the late 1980s and early 1990s.

In this model, trade unions are not distinct from social movements and form part of a wider ecosystem of political activism that includes faith groups, civic and residents' organizations and student groups. These are usually organized into democratic umbrella organizations along a popular front model. The umbrella organization generally has a programme or manifesto that all affiliates commit themselves to.

Kim Moody theorized that the main characteristics of social movement unionism are:

- Militancy
- Internal democracy
- An agenda for radical social and economic change
- A determination to embrace the diversity of the working class in order to overcome its fragmentation
- A capacity to appeal beyond its membership by using union power to lead community struggles.

Usually, the structure of this type of union tends to implement democratic processes in order to promote more militancy from union members.

== Examples of social movement unionism ==
A prime example of social movement unionism is the link between the trade union federation Cosatu and the wider anti-apartheid struggle through the United Democratic Front in South Africa in the 1980s. More recently, Cosatu has successfully campaigned with the Treatment Action Campaign for access to medication for HIV/AIDS. Social movement unionism is also a feature of the industrial relations of Brazil and the Philippines.

SMU is widely considered to be a highly dynamic and successful model, as evidenced by the success against apartheid and for treatment access, and by the fact that countries practising this model have generally reversed the trend of trade union decline experienced in the developed world. For instance, union density grew in South Africa by 130% between 1985 and 1995, during a period of steep decline in many developed countries.

The Green bans performed by the New South Wales branch of Builders Labourers Federation (Australia) are said to be an early precursor of social movement unionism. The branch mainly engaged in boycotting the construction of socially and environmentally damaging projects, but did not limit itself to it and also engaged in a wide range of social struggles during the 70s, and embraced women, LGBT people, Aboriginal people, and migrants.

Other prominent examples include the relationship between Reclaim the Streets and the Liverpool Dockers (UK) during their strike in the late 1990s; and the relationship between the Coalition of Immokalee Workers and progressive US students during the Boot the Bell campaign. Various labour–environmental coalitions also fit this social movement model.

== See also ==
- Broad left
- Red–green alliance
