= Labor Notes =

American non-profit organization

- February 2019 cover
- Editor: Mischa Gaus
- Former editors: Jane Slaughter; Chris Kutalik
- First issue: March 1979
- Company: Labor Education and Research Project
- Country: United States
- Based in: Detroit, Michigan
- Language: English
- ISSN: 0275-4452

Labor Notes is a monthly magazine that supports union organizing and collective bargaining in the United States. It is published by the Labor Education and Research Project, an American non-profit organization and network for rank-and-file union members and grassroots labor activists.

The magazine reports news and analysis about labor activity and issues facing the labor movement. It promotes a revitalization of the labor movement through social movement unionism and union democracy. Labor Notes is based in Detroit, Michigan, with an East Coast office in Brooklyn, New York. It grew from a strategy by labor activists who sought to build grassroots connections across unions and industries. It works to bridge the gap between isolated rank-and-file caucuses and reform groups. The most notable example is Teamsters for a Democratic Union. Its coverage includes major unions such as the Teamsters, the Steelworkers, the United Auto Workers, the Communications Workers of America, and the American Federation of Teachers.

== History ==
Labor Notes was launched to help strengthen those linkages following the Bituminous Coal Strike of 1977–1978 and the cross-union solidarity it generated. The goal was to support reform efforts that could reinforce the earlier waves of union militancy in the decade. Headlines in the first year included themes such as “Teamster Steelhaulers Show Muscle in Three-Week Wildcat Strike”.

The Reagan-era rollbacks on labor law protections were followed by a period of decline for unions. Rank-and-file groups and Labor Notes began to focus on how labor leaders struggled to address the sharp decline facing unions and working people. As resistance to employer concessions grew, Labor Notes provided information and arguments about these concessions. In 1982, the first Labor Notes conference, Organizing Against Concessions, brought together hundreds of activists. In 1983, Labor Notes published one of its first books, Concessions and How to Beat Them by Jane Slaughter.

Although anti-labor trends continued in the 1990s, there were also signs of renewed activity. The AFL-CIO elected new leadership and the federation devoted more resources to organizing new members, including Latino and other immigrant workers who had long been overlooked. Reformers briefly took control of the Teamsters union and led the 1997 UPS strike, a major work stoppage that won a favorable contract for workers. During the 1990s, Labor Notes reported on issues such as cross-border organizing and free trade. It opposed the North American Free Trade Agreement (NAFTA) and published Unions and Free Trade by Kim Moody and Mary McGinn in 1992.

In 2000, the Global Justice Movement grew during protests against corporate globalization in Seattle, Quebec, and other cities. Labor Notes took part in many of these events and reported on the alliances between union members and global justice activists. It also supported campaigns such as the Charleston Five longshore workers and the telecommunications workers’ victories at Verizon.

After the September 11, 2001 attacks, Labor Notes reported on the large public employee strike in Minnesota, where workers demanded a fair contract despite criticism that the strike was unpatriotic. As immigrant workers centers grew as new forms of worker self-organization, Labor Notes covered these developments and brought their leaders together at its bi-annual conference. It has also reported on the major immigrant rights demonstration and the growth of U.S. Labor Against the War.

== Books ==
Labor Notes has published a number of books on labor-related themes. Its best-known titles include A Troublemaker’s Handbook: How to Fight Back Where You Work and Win by Dan La Botz, published in 1991, and its sequel A Troublemaker’s Handbook 2 by Jane Slaughter, published in 2005. Another widely used book is Democracy is Power: Rebuilding Unions from the Bottom Up, by Mike Parker and Martha Gruelle. It was first printed in 1999 and re-released in 2005.

== Conferences ==
Every two years, Labor Notes holds a national conference that brings together more than a thousand union members and leaders from the United States, Canada, Mexico, and other countries. The purpose of these conferences is to help activists build networks based on shared issues. The most recent such conference was in June, 2026.
