= Phyllis Jacobson =

American socialist activist and editor

Phyllis Jacobson (1922 – March 2, 2010) was an American socialist. Together with her lifetime political and personal partner Julius Jacobson, she co-edited the independent left journal New Politics from the 1960s until the end of the 20th century.

== Biography ==
Born into a New York City Jewish working-class family, she joined the Young People's Socialist League (YPSL) affiliated with the Socialist Party as a teenager in the 1930s, where she met Julius Jacobson. Together they were persuaded of revolutionary socialism in its Trotskyist expression and they played a role in successor youth organizations to the YPSL associated with the Socialist Workers Party and the Workers Party. Between the 1930s and 1950s, at a time when the Communist Party had sway over much of the left in the United States, the Jacobsons were associated with a radically democratic current of the socialist movement which rejected Stalinist bureaucratic collectivism and understood the Soviet Union to be a perversion of socialism because of its lack of workers' control over industry and society. They were founding members of the Independent Socialist League, for which she was briefly the Manhattan organizer and which espoused Third Camp socialism.

As the ISL and its leader Max Shachtman began to turn, in their view, toward the Right after 1956, the Jacobsons persisted in what they perceived to be their left-wing democratic socialism, like Hal Draper, and declined to follow Shachtman and his circle, who, they thought, became virtually or wholly neoconservative. Together the Jacobsons launched New Politics in 1961. She was active in the periodical from the outset but her role was formally recognized in 1968 when she became the first woman listed as a member of its editorial board; subsequently the Jacobsons would be listed as co-editors.

Phyllis Jacobson was critical to the journal's operations. "It was Phyllis who handled the day-to-day work of the journal," wrote a New Politics editorial board member in an obituary. "She cajoled authors and financial contributors to meet deadlines. She had the unique tact to convince often thin-skinned writers to accept editorial suggestions, and, when rarely necessary, editorial fiats. She maintained and meticulously updated the vast rolodex of contacts, donors, and subscribers. She coordinated the layout, printing and distribution. Some though that she, unlike Julie, was the real schmoozer, with a rollicking laugh so infectious that rare indeed were those who could resist joining her."

New Politics kept alive two intellectual traditions in unpropitious times: the current of independent radical socialism and the freewheeling "little magazine" published independently of the academic world. For the last decade of her life Phyllis Jacobson was paralyzed by a debilitating stroke, but the journal still continued to be published then, as well as after the Jacobsons' deaths.

== Writings ==
- "The Need to Say NO," New Politics, 1962
- "Kate Millett and Her Critics," New Politics, 1970
- "Black Outrage in Los Angeles," New Politics, 1992
- "Two Invented Lives," New Politics, 1997
