= Shachtmanism =

Marxist analysis of USSR bureaucracy as non- or anti-proletarian

Shachtmanism is the form of Marxism associated with the American Marxist theorist Max Shachtman (1904–1972). It has two major components: a bureaucratic collectivist analysis of the Soviet Union and a third camp approach to world politics. Shachtmanites believe that the Stalinist rulers of proclaimed socialist countries are a new ruling class distinct from the workers and reject Trotsky's description of Stalinist Russia as a "degenerated workers' state".

== Origin ==
Shachtmanism originated as a tendency within the US Socialist Workers Party in 1939, as Shachtman's supporters left that group in 1940 to form the Workers Party. The tensions that led to the split extended as far back as 1931. However, the theory of "bureaucratic collectivism", the idea that the USSR was neither a "workers' state" of any kind nor a form of capitalism, but rather was ruled by a new form of bureaucratic class, did not originate with Shachtman, but seems to have originated within the Trotskyist movement with Yvan Craipeau, a member of the French Section of the Fourth International, and Bruno Rizzi.

Although the Shachtman group's resignation from the SWP was not only over the defence of the Soviet Union, rather than the class nature of the state itself, that was a major point in the internal polemics of the time.

== Currents influenced by Shachtman ==
Regardless of its origins in the American SWP, Shachtmanism's core belief is opposition to the American SWP's defence of the Soviet Union. This originated not with Shachtman but Joseph Carter (1910–1970) and James Burnham (1905–1987), who proposed this at the founding of the SWP in 1938. C. L. R. James (1901–1989) referred to the implied theory, from which he dissented, as Carter's little liver pill. The theory was never fully developed by anybody in the Workers Party and Shachtman's book, published many years later in 1961, consists earlier articles from the pages of New International with some political conclusions reversed. Ted Grant (1913–2006) has alleged that some Trotskyist thinkers, including Tony Cliff (1917–2000), who have described such societies as "state capitalist" share an implicit theoretical agreement with some elements of Shachtmanism. Cliff, who published a critique of Shachtmanism in the late 1940s, would have rejected this allegation.

=== Left Shachtmanism ===
Left Shachtmanism, influenced by Max Shachtman's work of the 1940s, sees Stalinist nations as being potentially imperialist and does not offer any support to their leadership. This has been crudely described as seeing the Stalinist and capitalist countries as being equally bad, although it would be more accurate to say that neither is seen as occupying a more progressive stage in the global class struggle.

A more current term for Left Shachtmanism is Third Camp Trotskyism, the Third Camp being differentiated from capitalism and Stalinism. Prominent Third Camp groupings include the Workers' Liberty grouping in Australia and the United Kingdom and by the International Socialist predecessor of Solidarity.

The foremost left Shachtmanite was Hal Draper (1914–1990), an independent scholar who worked as a librarian at the University of California, Berkeley, where he organized the Independent Socialist Club and became influential with left-wing students during the Free Speech Movement. Julius Jacobson (1922–2003) and the New Politics journal continued to develop and apply this political tradition.

=== Social democratic Shachtmanism ===
Social democratic Shachtmanism, later developed by Shachtman and associated with some members of the Social Democrats, USA, holds Soviet Communist states to be so repressive that communism must be contained and, when possible, defeated by the collective action of the working class. Consequently, adherents support free labor unions and democracy movements around the world. Domestically, they organized in the civil rights movement and in the labor movement. Social democrats influenced by Shachtman rejected calls for an immediate cease-fire and the immediate withdrawal of U.S. forces from Vietnam, but rather opposed bombings in Vietnam and supported a negotiated peace that would allow labor unions and government-opposition to survive. Such social democrats helped provide funding and supplies to Solidarity, the Polish labor union, as requested by the Polish workers.

=== Libertarian Shachtmanism ===
Libertarian socialist tendencies developed within early Shachtmanism, leading to certain individuals and groups moving towards anarchism and libertarian Marxism. Dwight Macdonald left the Workers Party shortly after it was first established, founding the Politics magazine and becoming an anarcho-pacifist during World War II. While still within the Workers Party, the Johnson–Forest Tendency developed a form of libertarian Marxism that characterized the Soviet Union as state capitalist, while also developing a black liberationist program. The trade union activist Stan Weir was in turn inspired by the Johnsonites to reject vanguardism and traditional trade unionism, in favor of a bottom-up syndicalist model. While Murray Bookchin himself had stayed with the Cannonite Socialist Workers Party, he briefly joined a group that worked together with the Shachtmanite Workers Party, later developing towards a green anarchist philosophy - which he labelled "social ecology".

In the wake of World War II, the Independent Socialist League began to forge alliances with other "third camp" groups, holding joint conferences with such organizations as the Industrial Workers of the World, the Libertarian League and the War Resisters League. An anarchist newspaper noted that the ISL's political thought had developed greatly since its break with orthodox Trotskyism in 1939, stating that "in some respects these comrades are evolving in a generally libertarian direction." However, as Shachtman himself moved towards social democratic tendencies, the further left segments led by Hal Draper split to form the International Socialists, attracting many libertarian socialists through Draper's pamphlet Two Souls of Socialism - which advocated for a popular and democratic "socialism from below". However, due to the International Socialists' preoccupation with electoralism, revolutionary socialists split from the organization to form the Revolutionary Socialist League, which included a sizeable number of libertarian socialists. Libertarians of the RSL, led by Christopher Z. Hobson and Ron Tabor, eventually broke entirely from Trotskyism, Leninism and Marxism, becoming anarchists and forming the founding nucleus of the Love & Rage Anarchist Federation. Tabor later identified Left Shachtmanism as having provided a bridge between Trotskyism and anarchism, through the concepts of the "Third Camp", "socialism from below" and the "united front". He also criticized the International Socialists for its social democratic, centrist and reformist tendencies. Draper, in turn, has criticized anarchism as "fundamentally antidemocratic in ideology", labeling it as an elitist and authoritarian ideology.

The International Socialist Organization also established itself around Draper's conception of "socialism from below", and like the Revolutionary Socialist League before it, a number of anarchists have since left the organization after developing towards more libertarian philosophies.

== In popular culture ==
- Harvey Swados's 1970 novel Standing Fast focuses on a fictionalised version of the Shachtmanite Workers Party; the character Marty Dworkin is based on Shachtman.
- The 2013 film Inside Llewyn Davis contains a joke about Shachtmanism. The character of Llewyn Davis is loosely based on the folk singer Dave Van Ronk, who was at one time a member of the Young Socialist League, the organisation formed via a merger of the youth section of the Shachtmanite Independent Socialist League with the youth section of the Socialist Party.

== Bibliography ==
- Kahn, Tom (2007) [1973], "Max Shachtman: His ideas and his movement" (PDF), Democratiya (Merged with Dissent in 2009), 11: 252–259, ISSN 1946-0910, OCLC 664602786
- Price, Wayne (1 November 2016). "From Shachtmanite Trotskyism to Anarchism". The Utopian. 15 (2). New York: 59–74. OCLC 50734962.
