= Julius Jacobson =

American socialist writer, editor and former soldier

Julius Jacobson (1922 – March 8, 2003) was an American socialist writer and editor who edited Anvil, New International, and New Politics, all publications in the Third Camp tradition of socialism, a democratic Marxist tradition sometimes called "Shachtmanite" after its significant theorist, Max Shachtman.

== Biography ==
Jacobson came from an East European Jewish immigrant family in New York City. The family was politically leftist and he was politically active at a very young age, first joining the Communist Party's Young Communist League, but soon leaving that group for the Young People's Socialist League of the Socialist Party of America, where he became a Trotskyist and met his wife Phyllis Jacobson.

Drafted into military service during World War II, he saw combat in Europe and participated in the liberation of Paris. While in Europe, he participated in contact between European and American Trotskyists.

An early ally of Max Shachtman and Hal Draper, he followed them out of the Socialist Workers Party and with them was one of the founding members of the Workers Party, later known as the Independent Socialist League, eventually becoming editor of its journal New International.

Like Hal Draper, Jacobson was opposed to the merger of the ISL into the Socialist Party of America and to Shachtman's drift toward the right politically. Unlike Draper, he did not turn his energies toward creating a new socialist group, but rather into the creation of an independent journal, New Politics, in 1961, together with Phyllis Jacobson. He remained active as a writer and editor of New Politics up until his death in 2003.

In addition to his work published in Anvil, New International and New Politics, Jacobson contributed to the following books: The American Communist Party. A critical history, 1919-1957 (pub 1957 with Irving Howe and Lewis Coser), The Negro and the American Labor Movement (1968), Soviet Communism and the Socialist Vision (1972) and Socialist Perspectives (1983, with Phyllis Jacobson).

== See also ==
- New Politics
- Phyllis Jacobson
