= B. J. Widick =

American labor activist (1910–2008)

B. J. Widick (born Branko J. Widick in Okučani, present-day Croatia, October 25, 1910; died Ann Arbor, Michigan, June 28, 2008) was an American labor activist in the United Auto Workers union and socialist movements.

== Background ==
An immigrant to the United States from Yugoslavia with his father when he was three years old, Widick attended the University of Akron in Ohio, graduating with a degree in economics in 1934.

== Career ==
In the Great Depression of the 1930s, Widick became active in the political left, first as a sympathizer with the Communist Party USA, then as a participant in the American Trotskyist movement. He joined the Communist League of America in 1934 and followed the Trotskyist movement's various configurations through the decade, helping to form the Socialist Workers Party in 1938.

Widick was a reporter for the Akron Beacon Journal from 1933 to 1936 and was involved in drives by the Committee of Industrial Organizations to unionize the rubber industry in Ohio, becoming the research director for the United Rubber Workers in 1937.

In 1937 Widick traveled to Mexico and met with the exiled Russian revolutionary Leon Trotsky to discuss the American labor upsurge, and there he met Diego Rivera and Frida Kahlo. In the 1940 split of the Trotskyist movement, however, Widick went with the minority current of dissidents led by Max Shachtman and helped found the Workers Party, writing for its periodicals Labor Action and New International, often under pseudonyms.

After serving in the army during World War II Widick became active in the United Auto Workers as a chief steward and plant official in a Chrysler plant from 1947 until 1959. The UAW at that time was in the heyday of its influence, both within the broad labor movement and in American society. In 1960–61, Widick joined the national staff of the union as an aide to UAW leader Walter Reuther, about whom he had written a biography, The UAW and Walter Reuther (1949), with Irving Howe.

In 1949, the Workers Party had become the Independent Socialist League. By the end of the 1950s, as the movement fragmented, Widick was mostly aligned with Michael Harrington and Bogdan Denitch, who would later establish the Democratic Socialists of America. In the 1960s, he became a professor of labor studies, teaching at Wayne State University and Columbia University.

== Legacy ==
Nelson Lichtenstein has written that Widick "was a synthesizer more than a truly original thinker," but that "his authority as writer and teacher was rightly enhanced by his rich engagement with a generation of shop militants and union leaders, which he deployed to frame and popularize for postwar labor-liberals key issues facing the unions in an era of racial tension, industrial conflict and urban decline."

== Writings ==
He contributed articles to The Nation, The New Republic, Dissent, and New Politics.

His writings include:

- The UAW and Walter Reuther, with Irving Howe (Random House, 1949)
- Labor Today: The Triumphs and Failures of Unionism in the United States (Houghton, 1964)
- Detroit: City of Race and Class Violence (Quadrangle, 1972; rev. ed., Wayne State University Press, 1989)
- Editor, Auto Work and Its Discontents (Johns Hopkins University Press, 1976)
