= Herbert Hill (labor director) =

American civil rights activist (1924–2004)

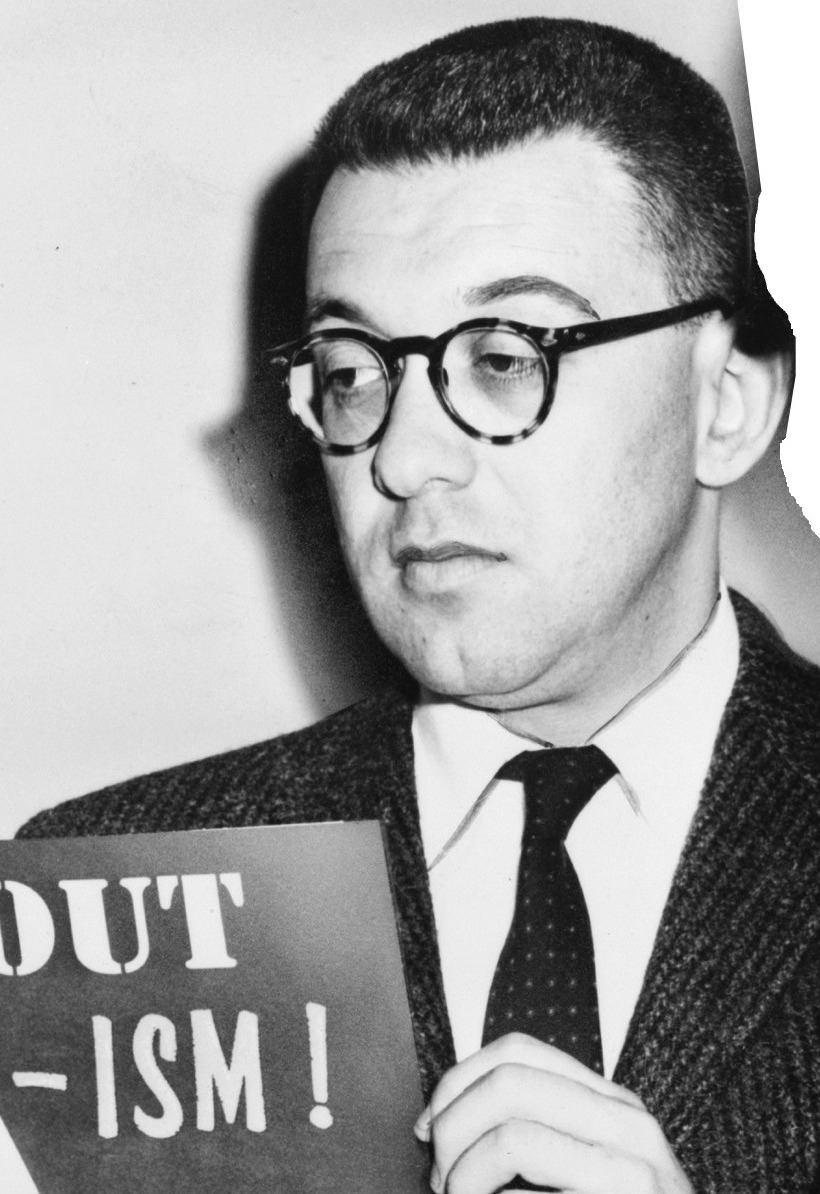
- Hill in 1956
- Born: January 24, 1924; Brooklyn, New York, U.S.
- Died: August 15, 2004 (aged 80); Madison, Wisconsin, U.S.
- Education: New York University (B.A.); New School for Social Research
- Occupations: NAACP labor director, writer
- Spouse: Mary Lydon (died 2001)

Herbert Hill (January 24, 1924 – August 15, 2004) was the labor director of the National Association for the Advancement of Colored People for decades and was a frequent contributor to New Politics as well as the author of several books. He was later Evjue-Bascom Professor of Afro-American Studies and Industrial Relations at the University of Wisconsin–Madison and eventually emeritus professor. He played a significant role in the civil rights movement in pressuring labor unions to desegregate and to seriously implement measures that would integrate African Americans in the labor market. He was also famous for his belief that American trade unions had downplayed the history of racism that tarred their reputations, before and after the Jim Crow era.

== Early years ==
Herbert Hill was born into a Jewish family on January 24, 1924, in Brooklyn, New York. He was educated in the public school system. Hill earned a B.A. from New York University in 1945 and attended the New School for Social Research from 1946 until 1948 where he studied under the distinguished political theorist, Hannah Arendt.

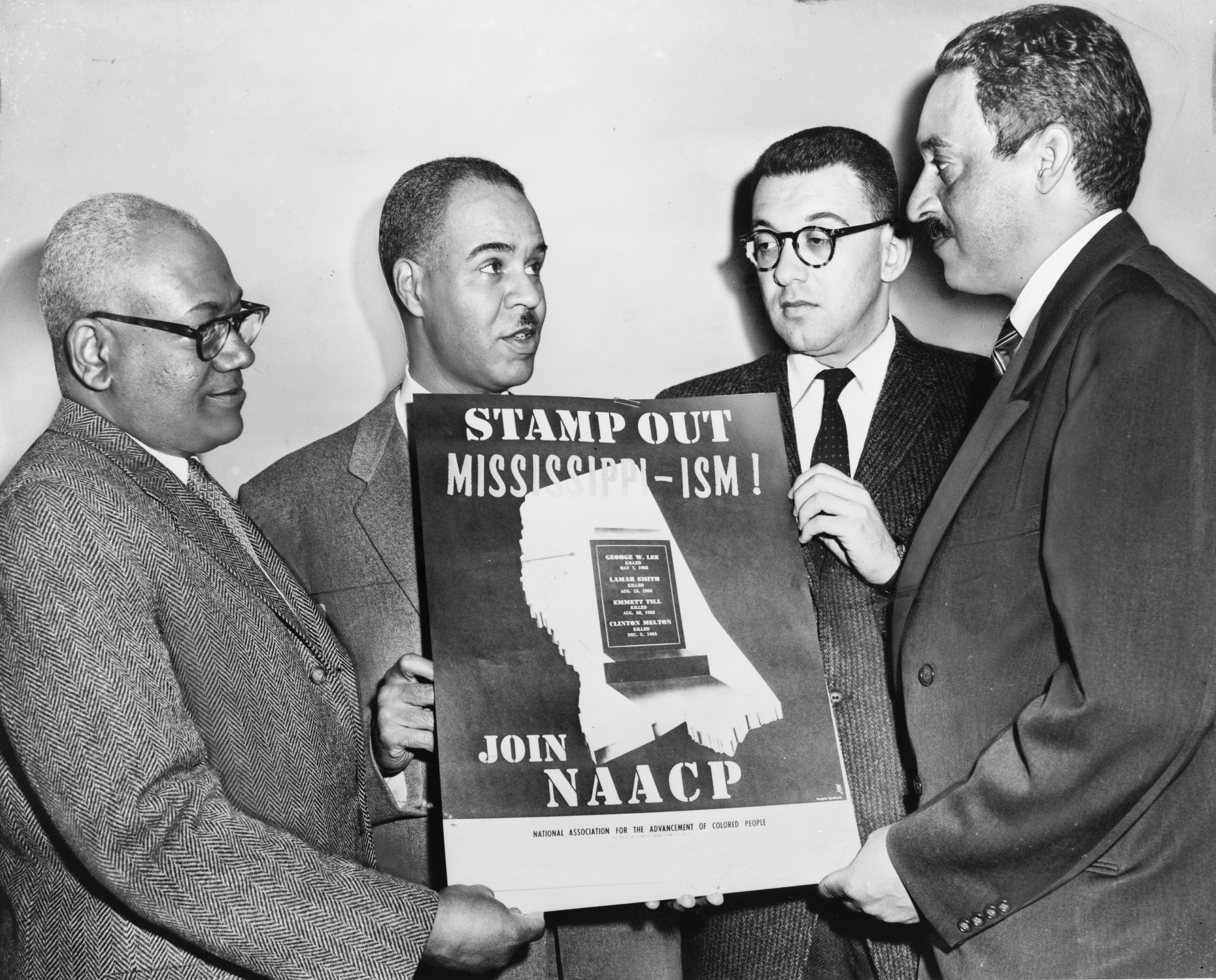
Hill (third from left), with fellow NAACP leaders Henry L. Moon, Roy Wilkins, and Thurgood Marshall

== Activism ==
During the 1940s, Hill was a member of the Socialist Workers Party. In 1951, he was appointed Labor Director of the NAACP, where he worked until 1977, when he departed for a professorship at the University of Wisconsin–Madison. He was highly critical of the practice of nepotism in many unions whereby relatives of members were hired. Hill criticized labor relations practices in numerous industries, including the film industry, as well as the progress of the Kennedy Administration on issues of racial equality in the workplace. Among the unions he criticized for their record on racial equality were the International Ladies Garment Workers Union, the United Auto Workers, the United Federation of Teachers and the United Steelworkers of America as well as the AFL-CIO federation itself. Hill particularly objected to the AFL-CIO position that Title VII of the Civil Rights Act of 1964 should not interfere with existing seniority systems. He was also a strong supporter of affirmative action. According to labor historian Nelson Lichtenstein, Supreme Court Justice Thurgood Marshall once described Hill as "the best barbershop lawyer in the United States".

He also organized pickets to raise awareness of racial discrimination in the construction industry. His conduct was so controversial that some unions threatened to withhold funding from the NAACP unless Hill was fired, but the NAACP leadership under Roy Wilkins supported Hill.

Hill published more than one hundred articles in journals, anthologies and newspapers and was also known for polemics against labor historian Herbert Gutman as well as debates in New Politics magazine with union leader Al Shanker and Nelson Lichtenstein, an academic and biographer of Walter Reuther. Hill was especially sharp against Lichtenstein's support for the allegedly racist Reuther and the UAW's activities to betray the civil rights movement. He also served as a consultant for the Equal Employment Opportunity Commission and the United Nations.

=== ILGWU Campaign ===
One of the most important campaigns led by Hill was his campaign against the discriminatory practices of the International Ladies' Garment Workers' Union (ILGWU). Despite the fact that the ILGWU had cooperated with the NAACP with respect to desegregation of union locals in the South, as late as the early 1960s, there were still no African-American nor Puerto Rican officers or executive board members in the ILGWU in its New York City base. The ILGWU was of particular importance because of its major role in the Liberal Party of New York. Hill played a key role in taking on a complaint against Local 10 of the ILGWU of an African-American cutter, Ernest Holmes, who had been repeatedly prevented from joining the cutters' union, thereby receiving lower wages and denied the health and welfare benefits associated with union membership. Hill alleged that the ILGWU restricted African-American and Puerto Rican workers to low-paying jobs. In 1962, the New York State Commission for Human Rights found that Local 10 had violated the state antidiscrimination law. The ILGWU launched a public relations campaign alleging partisanship on the part of the Republican appointed Commission in response and did little to solve the problem. Writing in New Politics, a leading ILGWU official, Gus Taylor, attempted to show that there were African Americans and Puerto Ricans in the union. Adam Clayton Powell Jr. held Congressional hearings in the House Committee on Education and Labor on the ILGWU practices in 1962. Hill testified at the hearings, criticizing David Dubinsky for his governance of the ILGWU. Even though Hill was Jewish, allegations of antisemitism were made with respect to the NAACP critique of the ILGWU. Changes to the ILGWU only came about slowly, especially after the retirement of Dubinsky in 1966.

== Alleged FBI informant ==
Research published in Labor History by historian Christopher Phelps holds that Hill was an informer for the Federal Bureau of Investigation on socialists he knew in the 1940s. Documents between high-level FBI officials referred to a male subject with a short redacted surname in New York who was an "SWP member during the period 1943-1949," the period in which Hill belonged to the Socialist Workers Party, and who in 1962 was "currently employed by the NAACP as a labor relations official," when there was no other labor official at the NAACP. According to a collection of, "bureau memos, part of the FBI’s Counter- Intelligence Program (COINTELPRO) effort to disrupt solidarity with the militant Monroe movement, refer repeatedly to Hill supplying information on his former comrades in the Socialist Workers Party (SWP), to which he belonged in the 1940s," according to some historians.

The FBI documents state that the subject was "contacted on several occasions by New York Agents and has been cooperative" and furnished "information on individuals that were in the SWP during the time he was a member." Other prominent NAACP officials, Phelps states, including Thurgood Marshall, Walter White, and Roy Wilkins are known to have cooperated with the FBI in its actions against the Civil Rights Congress and Communist Party.

However, the implications and significance of these allegations against Hill have been disputed by a number of academics.

== Death ==
Hill died on August 21, 2004, in Madison, Wisconsin, after a long illness. His death was announced by the University of Wisconsin, where Hill was an emeritus professor of Afro-American studies. Hill was preceded in death by his wife, Mary Lydon, in 2001.

== Works ==
- Anger and Beyond: The Negro Writer in the United States. Ed. Herbert Hill. New York: Harper & Row, 1966.
- The AFL-CIO and the black worker : Twenty five years after the merger. Alexandria, Virginia: National Association of Human Rights Workers, 1982.
- Black Labor and the American Legal System: Race, Work, and the Law. Madison: University of Wisconsin Press, 1985 edn.
- Race in America : The struggle for equality. Eds. Herbert Hill & James E. Jones Jr. Madison: University of Wisconsin Press, 1993.

== Citations ==
Sources used: New York Times obituary, University of Wisconsin Faculty Document 1824 and articles by and about Herbert Hill in New Politics magazine, including memorial articles by Stephen Steinberg, Michael Meyers and Gilbert Jonas.
