= Race relations =

Sociological concept of relationship between races

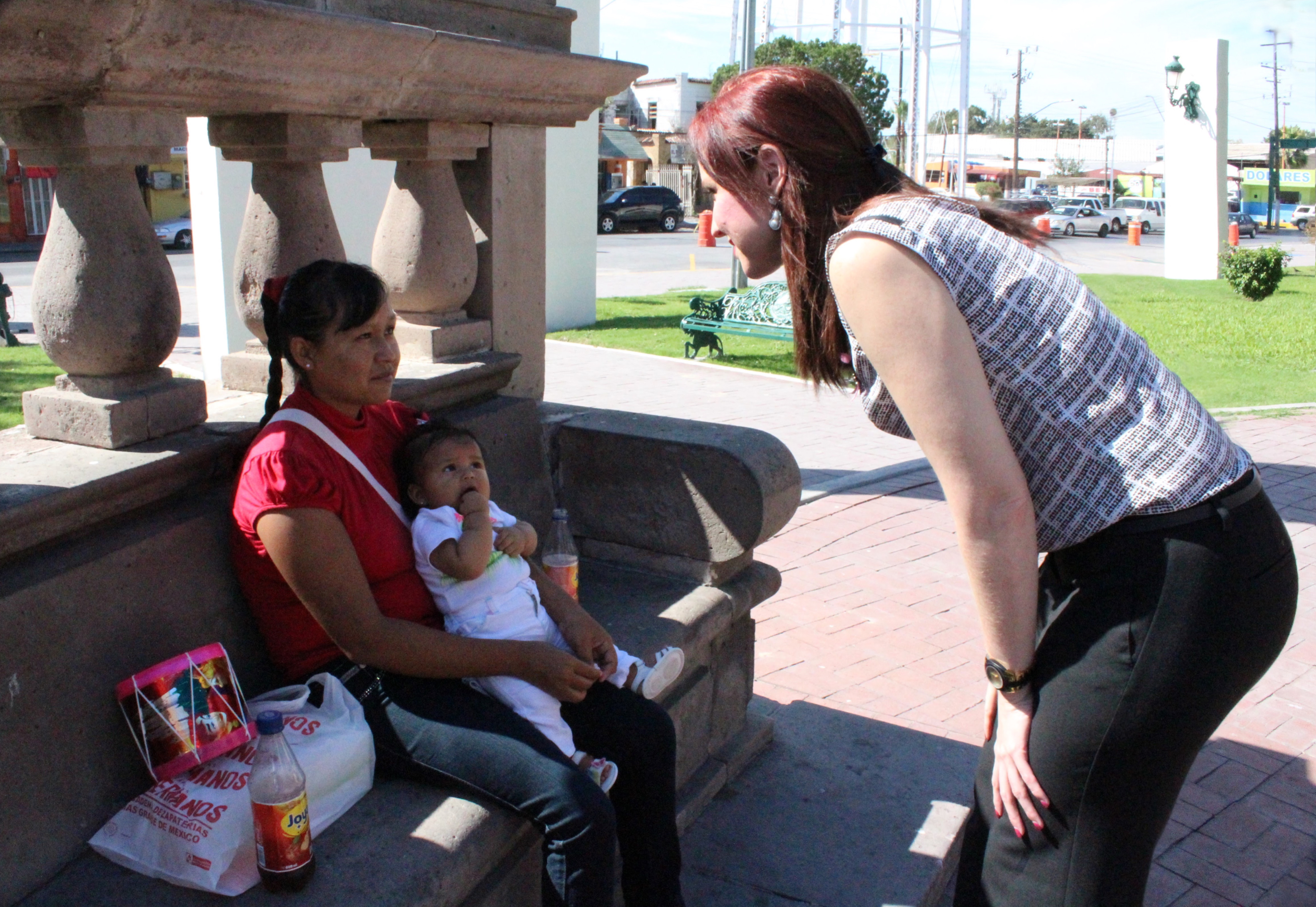
Race relations in Mexico

Race relations is a sociological concept that emerged in Chicago in connection with the work of sociologist Robert E. Park and the Chicago race riot of 1919. Race relations designates a paradigm or field in sociology and a legal concept in the United Kingdom. As a sociological field, race relations attempts to explain how racial groups relate to each other. These relations vary depending on historical, social, and cultural context. The term is used in a generic way to designate race related interactions, dynamics, and issues.

In the 1960s, the prevailing understanding of race relations was underdeveloped and was acknowledged by sociologists for its failure to predict the anti-racist struggles. It was critiqued for being explicitly used to give an explanation of violence connected to race. The use of paradigm was criticized for overlooking the power differential between races, implying that the source of violence is disharmony rather than racist power structures. Race relations are divided into positive and negative. Positive or good race relations promote equality, empathy, and inclusivity, while negative race relations generate tension, conflict, and social divisions.

Detractors of the term "race relations" have called it as a euphemism for white supremacy or racism. Opinion polls, such as Gallup polls, use the term "race relations" to group together various responses connected to race. University level sociology courses are often named "Race and Ethnic Relations".

== In the United States ==
Robert E. Park of the University of Chicago formulated a theory known as "race relations cycle," which is currently discredited. He believed race relations have a universal pattern: when races come into contact, at first they are hostile, but thaw over time. However, Park only conducted minimal studies related to it and did not examine its validity across ethnic groups to ensure its accuracy in representing reality.

The cycle was postulated to be driven by subjective attitudes that members of races feel toward other races. The steps in Park's cycle were contact, competition, accommodation, and assimilation. Park's students tested his ideas by studying communities of Chinese and Japanese origin living in the United States and found that, contrary to Park's theory, adopting white culture did not lead to acceptance by white Americans. However, Park did not discard his theory in spite of the failures to verify it.

In 1919, white residents of Chicago instigated the mass murder of black residents, an event known as the Chicago race riot of 1919. After this violent event, city authorities established the Chicago Commission on Race Relations. The commission was composed entirely of men, six African Americans and six European Americans.

Sociologist Everett Hughes published a collection of Park's articles in 1950, seven years after Park's death. The beginnings of the civil rights movement in the 1950s caused interest in the study of race, and Park's work became a founding text in the emerging field named "race relations."

Because race relations model imagined steady progress of whites, it failed to predict the radical upheavals of the civil rights movement in the 1960s. Everett Hughes delivered an address at the American Sociological Association (of which he was president) titled Race Relations and the Sociological Imagination in which Hughes confessed the failure of prediction: "Why did social scientists — and sociologists in particular — not foresee the explosion of collective action of Negro Americans demanding immediate full integration into American society?" African American scholars had little more than token representation in this field. Race relations model was considered by them as a failure of white social science.

The Kerner Report, commissioned by the US government in 1967 to study the causes of 1960s race riots, said that the Watts riots of 1965 "shocked all who had been confident that race relations were improving in the North." The report clarified that the major cause of the riots was white racism, and recommended job creation measures and police reform. President Lyndon B. Johnson discarded the report's recommendations.

In the 1970s, some sociologists in America sought to replace the term race relations with racial oppression, because that was the better notion of what race meant in that period. For example, the 1972 book Racial Oppression in America by Bob Blauner challenged the race relations paradigm on negative effects, he explained that the source of the problem between races is not because of some naturally inherent racial animosity but is deeply rooted in the way societal systems are or the society is organized and structured.

In 2020, the world witnessed the murder of George Floyd, an African American man, by Derek Chauvin, a white police officer, in a live-streamed video. This event triggered a significant shift in the US and around the world, leading to a new awareness and consciousness about race relations. The dominant culture started engaging in discussions about racial justice and anti-racist practices, as well as seeking ways to understand and address racial issues. The need to reduce negative race relations practices and promote racial justice became more apparent after the George Floyd incident. Efforts were reinforced to ensure equality, dismantle systemic racism, and address historical and present-day discrimination that affects marginalized racial and ethnic groups. To rectify the impacts of past and ongoing racial disparities, specific policies and practices like affirmative action gained importance. Affirmative action is not considered as a solution to negative race relations, but it is seen as one of the steps to counteract the effects of past discrimination and create a more level playing field where dominant racist social structures are present. This allows underrepresented groups to have access to the same opportunities, presence, and benefits as others. The goal is to correct the imbalances caused by historical discrimination, to interrupt the cycle of culturally reproduced discrimination, and foster greater inclusion and diversity in society.

== In the United Kingdom ==
The concept of race relations became institutionally significant in the United Kingdom through the establishment of the Department of Social Anthropology under the leadership of Kenneth Little at the University of Edinburgh.

=== Institutions ===
The Institute of Race Relations was established in 1958. Its remit was to research, publish and collect resources on race relations across the world. However, in 1972, the membership of the institute supported the staff in the radical transformation of the organization: rather than being a policy-oriented academic institution it became an anti-racist think tank.

The Race Relations Board was created following the passing of the Race Relations Act 1965 as a body "to assess and resolve individual cases of discrimination." Its remit was originally restricted to places of public resort and regarding disposal of tenancies, but this was expanded with the passage of the Race Relations Act 1968.

=== Legislation in the UK ===
Race Relations Acts have been adopted in the United Kingdom to outlaw racial discrimination and to tackle institutional racism:

- Race Relations Act 1965
- Race Relations Act 1968
- Race Relations Act 1976

The Equality Act 2010 superseded and consolidated previous discrimination law in the UK.

== Criticism ==
The concept of race relations has been criticized for implying a matched relationship between races. Stephen Steinberg of CUNY contends that the term "racial oppression" should be used in unevenly matched instances instead of negative race relation or simply "race relations":

While the term "race relations" is meant to convey value neutrality, on closer examination it is riddled with value. Indeed, its rhetorical function is to obfuscate the true nature of "race relations", which is a system of racial domination and exploitation based on violence, resulting in the suppression and dehumanization of an entire people over centuries of American history.

The term "race relations" describes more the relationship between two groups of people rather than the discrimination against them. Journalist Charles M. Blow observes that Americans who were polled on their "satisfaction with race relations" reported lower satisfaction after the rise of Black Lives Matter, an anti-racism movement. The term "race relations", according to Blow, "suggests a relationship that swings from harmony to disharmony". Objecting to racism creates awareness of disharmony, whereas silently submitting to racial oppression creates a false impression of harmonious race relations. Because of this counterintuitive result, Blow argues that the terms "race relations," "racial tension", and "racial division" are unhelpful euphemisms for what should properly be called white supremacy.

== Reconciliation ==
Reconciliation is a term used in truth and reconciliation commissions around the world, and used in various countries when referring to improving relations between their First Nations peoples and the rest of the population. Reconciliation in Australia has been part of Australian Government policy since 1991, and the term is also used in New Zealand, Canada, the United States (as in the Maine Wabanaki-State Truth and Reconciliation Commission), and in Europe.

== See also ==
- Sociology of race and ethnic relations
- Anti-oppressive practice
