= Workers Party (United States) =

Workers Party (1940–1949) Independent Socialist League (1949–1958)
- Leader: Max Shachtman
- Founded: April 1940
- Dissolved: August 1958
- Split from: Socialist Workers Party
- Merged into: Socialist Party of America
- Succeeded by: International Socialists
- Youth wing: Socialist Youth League
- Ideology: Third camp Trotskyism; Shachtmanism; Factions: Johnson–Forest Tendency (1940–47)
- Political position: Far-left

The Workers Party (WP) was a Third Camp Trotskyist group in the United States. It was founded in April 1940 by members of the Socialist Workers Party who opposed the Soviet invasion of Finland and Leon Trotsky's belief that the USSR under Joseph Stalin was still innately proletarian, a "degenerated workers' state." They included Max Shachtman, who became the new group's leader, Hal Draper, C. L. R. James, Raya Dunayevskaya, Martin Abern, Joseph Carter, Julius Jacobson, Phyllis Jacobson, Albert Glotzer, Stan Weir, B. J. Widick, James Robertson, and Irving Howe. The party's politics are often referred to as "Shachtmanite."

At the time of the split, almost 40% of the membership of the SWP left to form the Workers Party. The WP had approximately 500 members. Although it recruited among workers and youth during World War II it never grew substantially, despite having more impact than its numbers would suggest.

== Early years ==
By 1941, the WP had developed a minority tendency, led by C. L. R. James and Raya Dunayevskaya, known as the Johnson-Forest Tendency for its principal leaders' pseudonyms. It developed the viewpoint that Russia was state capitalist. The tendency developed the view that the WP should rejoin the Trotskyist Fourth International due to the imminence of a pre-revolutionary situation. In the meantime the SWP had from 1943 onwards developed a loose oppositional tendency led by Felix Morrow and Albert Goldman which, among other things, called for the WP to be readmitted to the SWP.

In 1945 and 1946, these two tendencies argued for their parties to regroup. However, discussions stalled after Goldman was found to be working with the WP's leadership. He left the SWP in May 1946 to join the WP, with a small group of supporters including James T. Farrell. The Johnson-Forest Tendency left the WP in October 1947 in order to rejoin the SWP, while Farrell and Goldman left in 1948 to join the Socialist Party of America.

Working in the labor movement during World War II, the party grew rapidly, largely as at a time of labor shortages which allowed its mainly New York Jewish intellectual members to take industrial jobs which would otherwise have been closed to them. It militantly opposed the no-strike pledge that the Congress of Industrial Organizations had agreed to with President Franklin Roosevelt for the duration of the war. At the same time the draft prevented the construction of a stable industrial base as much of the youthful membership was inducted into the armed forces. During the same period other younger members, such as Marvin Mandell and Betty Mandell, were recruited; they would later become co-editors of the Third Camp socialist magazine New Politics. Also, in the late 1940s, the Black author James Baldwin began a friendship with Stan Weir and became influenced by the politics of the "Shachtmanites."

== Youth organizations ==
The organization created a youth section, the Socialist Youth League, in 1946. After a merger with a number of former members of the Young People's Socialist League in the early 1950s, including Michael Harrington, who had left the latter organization because its parent organization, the SP, was too inclined to support United States foreign policy during the Cold War, the SYL renamed itself the Young Socialist League. It "re-merged" with the YPSL at the same time as the former Workers Party, now the Independent Socialist League, was merging with the Socialist Party-Social Democratic Federation in August 1958. A group led by Tim Wohlforth did not approve of this merger and joined the SWP-affiliated Young Socialist Alliance.

== International affiliation ==
Having departed the SWP the newly founded WP found itself outside the ranks of the Fourth International as well, but during the Second World War it continued to consider itself to be in political sympathy with the FI as a whole. In order to give expression to this the WP founded a "Committee for the Fourth International" to regroup its international "Third Camp" co-thinkers, including a group of émigré Germans. After WWII Shachtman would attend the Second World Congress of the Fourth International as an observer, only to reject the organization as having "proved incapable of abandoning its role of an utterly ineffectual left wing of Stalinist totalitarianism and counter-revolution."

== Independent Socialist League ==
In 1949, recognizing that it was far too small to properly call itself a party, the WP renamed itself the Independent Socialist League. It was removed from the US Attorney General's List of Subversive Organizations after a lengthy court battle, but failed to grow as Irving Howe and others exited the organization to start the political magazine Dissent.

From 1949 the organization published an internal discussion bulletin for its members called Forum.

In 1957, the ISL joined the SP-SDF, dissolving the following year. Some members took staff positions in the United Auto Workers and/or leading positions in the SP, many of them (including Shachtman) drifting rightward, some to the point where they supported the Bay of Pigs and the Vietnam War. A small group including Hal Draper left the SP milieu to form the Independent Socialist Clubs, which upheld the Third Camp tradition and opposed supporting any candidates of the Democratic Party, instead urging the creation of an independent labor party.

== "Third Camp" ==
From the start, the group distinguished itself from the SWP by advocating a Third Camp perspective. In an article published in April 1940, entitled "The Soviet Union and the World War," Shachtman concluded:

The revolutionary vanguard must put forward the slogan of revolutionary defeatism in both imperialist camps, that is, the continuation of the revolutionary struggle for power regardless of the effects on the military front. That, and only that, is the central strategy of the third camp in the World War, the camp of proletarian internationalism, of the socialist revolution, of the struggle for the emancipation of all the oppressed.

The group soon developed an analysis of the Soviet Union as a bureaucratic collectivist mode of production. It was the first group to use the slogan "Neither Washington nor Moscow," implying that its members actively opposed both capitalism and the states allied to the Soviet Union. They opposed both American and Russian imperialism and saw the "Communist" revolutions in Yugoslavia, China, and North Korea not as extensions of the Bolshevik revolution of 1917 but of the Stalinist counterrevolution in the USSR.

== In popular culture ==
Harvey Swados’s 1970 novel Standing Fast focuses on a fictionalised version of the Workers Party; the character Marty Dworkin is based on Max Shachtman.

== Publications ==
- F. Forest Outline of Marx's Capital: volume one [United States]: Educational Dept. Workers Party, U.S.A.
- C. L. R. James My friends: a fireside chat on the war (as "Native Son") New York : Workers Party 1940
- This is not our war! New York, N.Y., Workers Party 1940
- Labor's voice against the war: election platform of the Workers Party. New York, N.Y., Workers Party, Local New York, 1940
- Conscription--for what? : an open letter to the President of the United States. New York, N.Y. : Workers Party and the Young Peoples Socialist League, 1940
- Walter Weiss How to get jobs for all New York : Workers Party Election Campaign Committee, 1940
- Jim Crow on the run!: Negro bus drivers today, Negroes in the war industries tomorrow. New York, N.Y. : Workers Party and the Young Peoples Socialist League, 1941
- Henry Pelham On to Washington for Negro rights New York, N.Y. : Workers Party, 1941
- Henry Judd India in revolt New York, N.Y., Workers party 1942
- Ernest Erber The role of the party in the fight for socialism New York, N.Y., Educational Dept., Workers Party, U.S.A., 1942
- Max Shachtman For a cost-plus wage New York; The Workers party 1943
- Paul Temple ABC of Marxism. New York City, Workers Party, National Education Dept. 1943
- J. R. Johnson Education, propaganda, agitation: post-war America and Bolshevism. New York City, Workers Party, National Education Dept. 1943
- Max Shachtman The Struggle for the New Course New York: New International Pub. Co. 1943; originally published together with Trotskys The New Course
- Ernest Lund Plenty for all; the meaning of socialism New York, The Workers party, 1943
- The labor party question; resolutions of 1938 and 1944 on the relationship of the Marxists to the movement for a labor party. [New York?] National Educational Dept., Workers Party, 1944
- Hal Draper The truth about Gerald Smith: America's no. 1 fascist San Pedro, Calif: Workers Party, Los Angeles Section, 1945
- Max Shachtman Socialism: the hope of humanity New York: New International Pub. Co. 1945
- Workers Party election platform, New York City, 1945. New York, N.Y. : Issued by Workers Party Campaign Committee, 1945
- David Coolidge The New York elections and the fight against Jim Crow New York, N.Y. : Issued by Workers Party Campaign Committee, 1945
- Sing!: labor and socialist songs. [Los Angeles, Calif.] Workers Party, Los Angeles Section, 1945
- Security and a living wage; why workers strike. [New York, Workers Party, 1945
- Albert Glotzer Incentive pay: the speed-up new style New York: Workers Party, 1945 (as Albert Gates)
- Irving Howe Smash the profiteers: vote for security and a living wage, New York, N.Y. : Workers Party Campaign Committee, 1946.
- Max Shachtman The Fight for Socialism: The Principles and Program of the Workers Party New International Publishing Co., New York, 1946.
- Hal Draper Jim Crow in Los Angeles Los Angeles: Workers Party, 1946
- Hal Draper ABC of Marxism: outline text for class and self study Los Angeles: Workers Party, 1946
- 1947 municipal platform Chicago : Workers Party Campaign Committee, 1947
- Leon Trotsky Marxism in the United States (introduction) New York: Workers Party, 1947 (as Albert Gates)
- Irving Howe Don't pay more rent!, Long Island City, N.Y. : Published by Workers Party Publications for the Workers Party of the United States 1947.
- Albert Goldman The question of unity between the Workers party and the Socialist workers party, [Long Island City, Workers party publication, 1947
- Stop the enemies of the working people: a program for the Detroit elections. New York, N.Y. : Workers Party of America, 1947
- Ernest Erber The role of the trade unions: their economic role under capitalism Long Island City, N.Y. : National Educational Dept., Workers Party, 1947
- Herman W. Benson The Communist Party at the crossroads : toward Democratic Socialism or back to Stalinism New York, Published for the Independent Socialist League by New International Publishing Co., 1957.
- The case for unity : new perspectives for American socialism : resolution adopted by the July 1957 Convention of the Independent Socialist League New York, N.Y. : Independent Socialist League, 1957

== Similarly named American parties ==
- Workers Party of America
- American Workers Party
- Workers Party of the United States
