= Theodore Draper =

American historian, socialist activist and writer

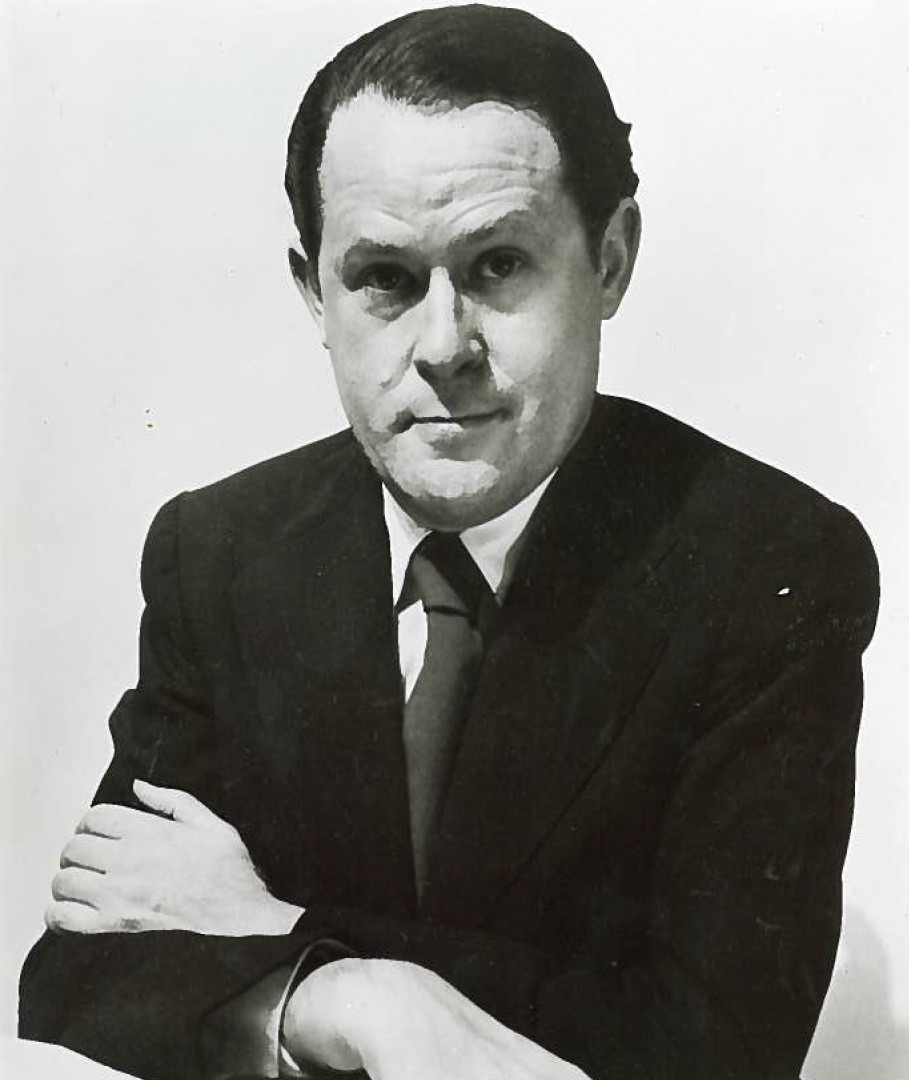
Draper c. 1957

Theodore H. Draper (September 11, 1912 – February 21, 2006) was an American historian and political writer. Draper is best known for the 14 books he completed during his life, including work regarded as seminal on the formative period of the American Communist Party, the Cuban Revolution, and the Iran–Contra affair. Draper was a fellow of the American Academy of Arts and Sciences and the 1990 recipient of the Herbert Feis Award for Nonacademically Affiliated Historians from the American Historical Association.

== Biography ==
=== Early years ===
Theodore Draper was born Theodore Dubinsky in Brooklyn, New York on September 11, 1912, one of four children. His younger brother was Hal Draper, who became a noted Marxist historian. Theodore's parents were ethnic Jews who emigrated to New York City from Ukraine, then part of the Russian Empire. His father, Samuel Dubinsky, was the manager of a shirt factory who died in 1924. His mother, Annie Kornblatt Dubinsky, ran a candy store to make ends meet following her husband's death.

He was raised in Brooklyn and graduated from the borough's Boys High School. His mother insisted they change the family name to the "American-sounding" surname "Draper" when Draper was 20 so that the children could avoid antisemitism during pursuit of their careers.

=== Political career ===
In 1930, Draper enrolled at the College of the City of New York, better known as "City College". There he joined the National Student League (NSL), a mass organization of the Communist Party USA targeted at organizing and mobilizing college students. This marked the start of a decade during which Draper chose to remain reliably within the Communist Party's orbit.

Draper later recalled:

My initiation came in the National Student League, which I joined in 1930... Most of its leaders were members of the Young Communist League, but I was not. I preferred being a "fellow-traveler," which was how I came to be around it. I was enough of a true believer to be convinced that whatever its faults or shortcomings, only the Communist movement was capable of making the "Revolution"; a revolutionary, therefore, had to be close to it. Nevertheless, I was unwilling to give up a measure of freedom or absence of discipline, such as I could enjoy as a fellow-traveler.

Draper noted that his non-party status "may even have helped me, because it could show that one did not have to be a card-carrying Communist to hold a leading position in the NSL." Membership did come at a cost, however, as a decision was made by the Communist Party to distribute NSL members from City College, where the organization was strong, to other campuses where the fledgling organization had no presence. Draper was instructed to enroll at the Brooklyn branch of City College, forerunner of Brooklyn College, a decision which he later remembered as "one of the saddest days of my life."

Draper graduated from Brooklyn College with a B.S. in philosophy in 1933; by this time, the College's National Student League organization "was so large and influential that it could virtually close down the school on May Day." Upon graduation he enrolled in the graduate program in history at Columbia University, which he attended for two years without taking a degree.

While attending a social function in 1935, Draper was approached by Harry Gannes, the foreign editor of the Communist Party's newspaper, The Daily Worker. The editor asked Ted whether he would be willing to put his prospective academic career aside and to instead come to work at the paper as his assistant. After giving the matter careful consideration, Draper decided to accept the offer and went to work at the Daily Worker, where he remained for two years as assistant foreign editor, writing for publication under the name Theodore Repard.

In the summer of 1936 Draper was tapped to go to Moscow as the Daily Worker's correspondent there. He was ready to travel to Russia when he was suddenly told he couldn't leave because the party had learned that his brother, Hal Draper, was a Trotskyist, causing Soviet authorities to regard Ted as a security risk. The position of Moscow correspondent was subsequently offered to another Daily Worker journalist.

In 1937, Draper moved to the Communist Party's literary-artistic weekly, The New Masses, where he took a position as foreign editor and wrote for publication under his real name. The magazine sent Draper to Europe in 1938 to cover the tense geopolitical situation there. Draper spent time in Paris, in Czechoslovakia covering the crisis which led to the "Munich Agreement" between Adolf Hitler and Neville Chamberlain, and in Spain covering the last days of the Spanish Civil War.

Upon returning from Europe in 1939, Draper was approached by a new fellow-traveling publishing house called Modern Age Publishers with an offer to write a book on the European political situation. Draper used the book advance as an excuse to quit The New Masses and he headed for Paris to conduct further research. Draper returned to the United States in November 1939, but the changing political situation — and the changing political line of the Communist Party in response to this — ultimately scrapped Draper's book project despite multiple re-writes.

Throughout 1939 and 1940 Draper continued to periodically write for the New Masses on various topics at the request of the editors. With France falling to Nazi Germany in the summer of 1940, Draper was urgently requested to contribute an article for publication on the significance of the event. An article entitled "New Moment in France" was produced and published in the July 9, 1940 issue, in which Draper argued that the French collapse had altered the balance of power in Europe and hinted that the Soviet Union would be a likely next target of the Nazis in their pursuit of "an ever widening circle of expansion for easy booty."

Draper remembered:

The article was delivered just before the deadline and must have gone in without much editorial deliberation. With everyone stunned by the French debacle, and no party line on it immediately established, my article had squeaked through. I was asked to write another article on the same subject for the following issue and attempted to say the same thing in even stronger form. But this time the party line caught up with me as a result of word from Moscow. The Soviet press let it be known that nothing had changed, there were no new problems or new conditions, no "new moment in Europe."... My second article was never published. It was the first time that any article of mine had been rejected. I was suddenly faced with the kind of personal political crisis that so many had confronted before and were to confront afterwards.

Draper refused to write any more articles for the New Masses after that date, limiting himself to a few book reviews so as to avoid a total severing of connections with the Communist movement. He also spent a six-month stint as correspondent for the Soviet news agency TASS, before joining the staff of a short-lived French-language weekly newspaper based in New York City. Despite being invited back into the fold after the June 1941 Nazi invasion of the Soviet Union validated his earlier prognostications, Draper felt this impossible and instead worked at a series of temporary jobs to make ends meet.

In 1943, Draper was drafted into the U.S. Army and was thereby "saved from thinking any more about American Communism, at least for the next three years." He was put to work in the Historical Section of the 84th Infantry Division, rising to the rank of technician fifth grade and ultimately writing the Division's official history of its activities during the Battle of the Ardennes in World War II. During his time with the 84th Infantry Division he met with Henry Kissinger and Fritz Kraemer, and stayed in friendly contact with the latter. In 1945, he was one of 16 Army officers and enlisted men singled out as alleged Communists by the House Committee on Military Affairs. General "Wild Bill" Donovan came to their defense, citing their loyalty and effectiveness. In 1944 Draper also saw the publication at last of a book on French affairs, when mainstream publisher Viking Press released a book by Draper called The Six Weeks' War. Draper's transition from a political journalist to a historian had begun.

=== Historian ===
Following World War II, Draper worked as a freelance journalist, writing extensively for Commentary magazine, a new publication of the American Jewish Committee, among other publications. In 1950 he began to write for a new bi-weekly news magazine called The Reporter, founded by Max Ascoli. Such writing tasks did not constitute full-time work, however, leaving time for Draper to engage in other literary pursuits.

With the growth of McCarthyism and the Second Red Scare, the subject of communism in America began to loom large in the public consciousness. Draper began to think of writing a "traditional" history of the American Communist Party based upon documentary sources and meeting scholarly standards and slowly began work on the project in his spare time. He was set free to work on the task full-time in 1952 by a grant from the newly established Fund for the Republic, set up as an autonomous organization by the Ford Foundation. Under the direction of political scientist Clinton Rossiter of Cornell University, the Fund for the Republic determined to publish a full-scale history of American communism. David A. Shannon of the University of Wisconsin was tapped to write the history of the CPUSA during the post-war period, while Draper was chosen to produce a monograph on the party's early years. Robert W. Iverson wrote The Communists and the Schools (1959) in that series.

Rossiter allowed Draper two years to complete the entire project, the history of American communism from its origins in 1919 until the sacking of party leader Earl Browder at the end of World War II. Draper set to work, mustering sources and conducting interviews with living participants of the formative period of the American Communist Party. One of those with whom he conducted an extensive correspondence was James P. "Jim" Cannon, a midwesterner who was sacked from the organization in 1928 for supporting Leon Trotsky and the Russian "Left Opposition." Draper noted that Cannon's letters soon became "more formal, better organized, each a little gem of its kind." These letters of Jim Cannon to Ted Draper were ultimately published in book form as The First Ten Years of American Communism in 1962.

In the meantime, Draper finished his book for Rossiter and the Fund for the Republic:

Two years later, I finished a book, but not the book.... I woke up one day to realize that I had written a book which ended in 1923, a turning-point in the story.... I was faced with a problem; 1923 was too far from 1945 to make up a plausible alibi. I could not expect anyone else to know what the significance of 1923 was and why it had become my stopping-point. Yet, somehow, without intending it, I had produced a book on the formative period of the formative period; it had a beginning, a middle, and an end; it was a book I knew, if the wrong one.

Draper turned in the manuscript to Clinton Rossiter, who was irate about the truncation of the narrative but was in great need of a publication to show that the Fund for the Republic project was alive and functioning. The manuscript thus found print without revision as The Roots of American Communism in 1957 and Rossiter set Draper back to work for two more years to complete the rest of the assigned time period.

To his own dismay, Draper repeated the stunt, terminating the second volume with the 1929 expulsion of party leader Jay Lovestone and his co-thinkers. Again Clinton Rossiter protested and published, with the Viking Press releasing the volume as American Communism and Soviet Russia in 1960.

A third volume was planned, for which Draper began assembling research material. Unfortunately, by this time the Fund for the Republic had run out of money and the story of the American Communist Party during the decade of the 1930s was left to be told by another writer at a later date. After several tries and failures to complete the task, Draper turned his research material over to a young scholar whose work he appreciated, Harvey Klehr of Emory University. Klehr's book, which made use of Draper's research material but to which Draper did not himself personally contribute, was ultimately published in 1984.

With his scholarly funding dried up and his interests shifting, Draper next moved to the hot-button topic of the Cuban Revolution as a focus for his scholarship. A series of articles, books, and pamphlets ensued, marked by the 1962 tome Castro's Revolution: Myths and Realities, published by Frederick A. Praeger publishers.

Draper's work as a historian of the Cuban Revolution brought him to the attention of the Hoover Institution on War, Revolution, and Peace, an anti-communist think tank located at Stanford University. Draper accepted a Hoover Institution fellowship and remained there until 1968, at which time he departed, ill at ease with the growing conservatism of the institution. Draper moved across country to accept a similar post at the Institute for Advanced Study located at Princeton University, where he focused his scholarship on the question of race relations.

Draper was a long-time contributor first to the magazine Commentary and later to The New York Review of Books.

Some of Draper's later works include A Very Thin Line, a history of the Iran–Contra affair, and A Struggle for Power, a monograph on the economic and political circumstances behind the American Revolution of 1776.

=== Death and legacy ===
Theodore Draper died on February 21, 2006, at his home in Princeton, New Jersey. He was 93 years old at the time of his death.

Draper's papers are housed in two locations. Materials relating to his two published books on American Communism and the Cuban Revolution are held by the Hoover Institution Archives, Stanford University, Palo Alto, California. An additional 63 boxes of material collected for his unpublished third book on American Communism, plus over 120 reels of microfilm and other research materials, are to be found at the Emory University Manuscripts, Archives, and Rare Book Library, Atlanta, Georgia.

== Works ==
- Spain in Revolt. As Theodore Repard, with Harry Gannes. New York: Alfred A. Knopf, 1936.
- The Six Weeks' War: France, May 10 – June 25, 1940. New York: Viking Press, 1944.
- The 84th Infantry Division in the Battle of the Ardennes, December 1944 – January 1945, Liege, Belgium: Historical Section, 84th Infantry Division, April 1945.
- The Roots of American Communism. New York: Viking Press, 1957.
- American Communism and Soviet Russia: The Formative Period. New York: Viking Press, 1960.
- "Ordeal of the UN: Khrushchev, Hammarskjöld, and the Congo Crisis". New York: The New Leader, 1960.
- Castro's Cuba: A Revolution Betrayed? New York: The New Leader, 1961.
- Cuba and United States Policy. New York: The New Leader, 1961.
- Castro's Revolution: Myths and Realities. New York: Praeger, 1962.
- "Castro's Communism". London, Encounter, 1962.
- "Five Years of Castro's Cuba". New York: American Jewish Committee, 1964.
- The Roots of the Dominican Crisis. New York: League for Industrial Democracy, 1965.
- Castroism, Theory and Practice. New York: Praeger, 1965.
- Abuse of Power. New York: Viking Press, 1967.
- Israel and World Politics: Roots of the Third Arab–Israeli War. New York: Viking Press, 1968.
- "The Dominican Revolt: A Case Study in American Policy". New York: Commentary, 1968.
- The Rediscovery of Black Nationalism. New York: Viking Press, 1970.
- The Dominican Intervention Reconsidered. Indianapolis: Bobbs-Merrill, 1971.
- The United States and Israel: Tilt in the Middle East? New York: American Jewish Committee, 1975.
- On Nuclear War: An Exchange with the Secretary of Defense: Caspar Weinberger vs. Theodore Draper. Boston: Council for a Livable World Education Fund.
- The Atlantic Alliance and Its Critics. With Robert W. Tucker and Linda Wrigley. New York: Praeger, 1983.
- Present History: On Nuclear War, Detente and Other Controversies. New York: Random House, 1983.
- A Present of Things Past: Selected Essays. New York: Hill & Wang, 1990.
- A Very Thin Line: The Iran–Contra Affairs. New York: Hill & Wang, 1991.
- A Struggle for Power: The American Revolution. New York: Times Books, 1996.
