= Harry Gannes =

American journalist

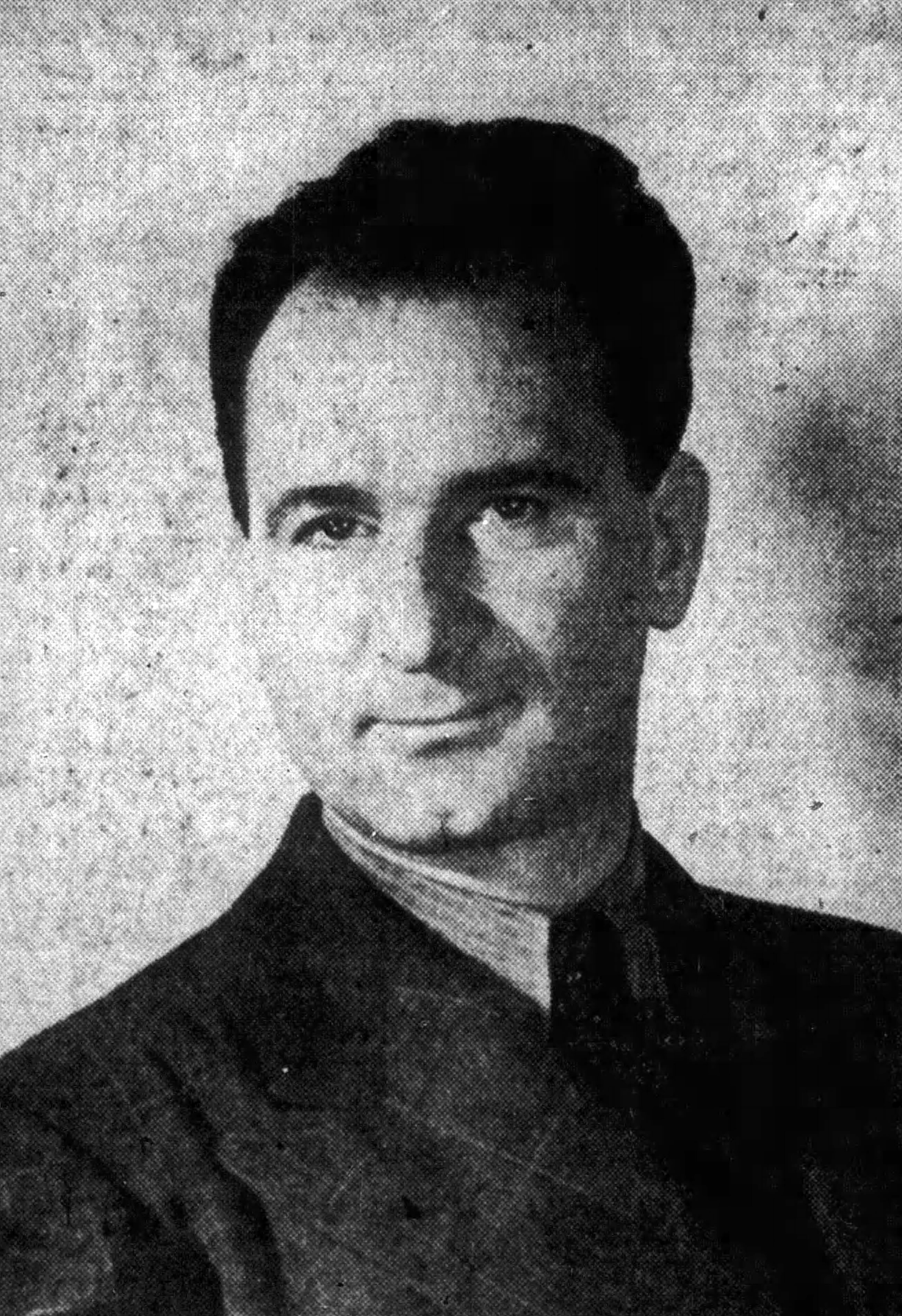
- Gannes c. 1941
- Born: 1900; Hull, England
- Died: January 3, 1941 (aged 40); New York City, U.S.
- Occupation: Journalist
- Spouse: Pearl Roth Gannes (third marriage)
- Children: Daughter from second marriage, son (David) from third marriage

Harry Gannes (1900–1941), was a British-born American journalist, foreign editor of the Daily Worker during much of the 1930s, was a communist of national prominence.

== Biography ==
Harry Gannes was one of the founders (in 1922) of the Young Workers League, the predecessor of the Young Communist League, serving briefly as its general secretary. As foreign editor of the Daily Worker he was a mentor to Theodore Draper, with whom he coauthored Spain in Revolt in 1936. His book When China Unites, 1937, based on research and experiences during a trip to China in 1932-33, describes the Kuomintang–Communist alliance of the mid-1920s and the confrontations between the two parties from 1927 on. Gannes traveled to China, and later to Europe (1938) using a passport under the name Henry George Jacobs. For this he was indicted for passport fraud in 1939. At almost the same time, he fell ill and was diagnosed with a brain tumor, from which he died on 3 January 1941.

== Published works ==
=== Books ===
- Spain in Revolt : A History of the Civil War in Spain, 1936, with Theodore Draper
- When China Unites An Interpretive History Of The Chinese Revolution, 1937

=== Pamphlets ===
- Youth under Americanism. With George Oswald. Chicago: Young Workers League of America, 1922.
- Yankee Colonies Imperialist Rule in the Philippines, Porto Rico, Hawaii and Other Possessions. New York: International Pamphlets, 1930.
- Graft and Gangsters. Jacob Burck, illustrator. New York City: Workers Library Publishers, 1931.
- Kentucky Miners Fight New York: Workers International Relief, 1932.
- The Economic Crisis: An Analysis of the Course of the Crisis up to June 15, 1931. New York: Communist Party USA, 1932.
- Soviets in Spain: The October Armed Uprising against Fascism. New York: Workers Library Publishers, 1935
- War in Africa Italian Fascism Prepares to Enslave Ethiopia. New York: Workers Library Publishers, 1935.
- Spain Defends Democracy: The Truth about the Fascist Plot. New York: Workers Library Publishers, 1936.
- How the Soviet Union Helps Spain. New York: Workers Library Publishers, 1936.
- The Munich Betrayal. New York City: Workers Library Publishers, 1938.
