= The Two Souls of Socialism =

Pamphlet by Hal Draper

- Author: Hal Draper
- Subject: Socialism
- Publication date: 1966

The Two Souls of Socialism is a pamphlet by the Marxist writer Hal Draper, in which the author posits a fundamental division in socialist thought and action between those who favor "Socialism from Above" and those who favor "Socialism from Below". The pamphlet was first published as a lengthy article in the journal New Politics in 1966, expanding upon an earlier version published in 1960 in the socialist student magazine Anvil. It has been anthologized, reprinted, and reissued in pamphlet form many times since then.

"Socialism from Above" is the name given by Draper to philosophies of collectivized property that envision administration from above by an elite, whether intellectual, political, or technical. "Socialism from Below" would proceed from a very different conception of common ownership, with power instead flowing from the workers themselves, with decision-making capacities broadly distributed. In the pamphlet, Draper argues that the divide between these two souls of socialism underlies all other divisions, such as "reformist or revolutionary, peaceful or violent, democratic or authoritarian, etc." Most of the pamphlet is a detailed typology and strongly worded criticism of various forms of socialism from above. Among the practitioners of socialism from above, Draper includes such varied forms of socialism as utopian socialism, Communist dictatorship and Stalinism, social democracy, and anarchism. Confessing that socialism from below "has had few consistent exponents and not many inconsistent ones", he nevertheless identifies it with Karl Marx, "whose notion was from the very beginning that the emancipation of the working class must be the act of the working class itself".

The piece is organized primarily as a brief history of socialism and important socialist thinkers, beginning with a critical glance at "ancestors" such as Plato, Pythagoras and the Gracchi brothers before turning to François-Noël Babeuf, Henri de Saint-Simon, and utopians such as Charles Fourier and Robert Owen. Draper then lauds Marx as the first champion of socialism from below "who finally fettered the two ideas of Socialism and Democracy together". The next sections of the pamphlet consider in turn subsequent manifestations of socialism from above, including anarchists (specifically Pierre-Joseph Proudhon and Mikhail Bakunin), Ferdinand Lassalle, the Fabians, Eduard Bernstein, and American socialists like Edward Bellamy. The final sections separate out "six strains of Socialism from Above" (philanthropism, elitism, plannism, communionism, permeationism, and "Socialism from Outside") and conclude with a call to intellectuals "to choose the road of Socialism from Below". Notably, the pamphlet does not devote consideration to the question of whether the Russian Revolution at its inception was guided by the principles of socialism from below or from above, although the entire pamphlet is implicitly guided by the moral and political opposition to Stalinism that shaped Draper's life work.
