= Karl Marx's Theory of Revolution =

1977–1990 book by Hal Draper

- Cover of volume one
- Author: Hal Draper
- Language: English
- Subject: Karl Marx
- Publisher: Monthly Review Press
- Publication date: 1977
- Publication place: United States
- Media type: Print (Hardcover and Paperback)
- ISBN: 978-0853454618 (vol. 1); 978-0853455660 (vol. 2); 978-0853456742 (vol. 3); 978-0853457985 (vol. 4); 978-1456303501 (vol. 5)

Karl Marx's Theory of Revolution is a 5-volume work (1977–1990) about the philosopher Karl Marx by the Marxist writer Hal Draper. First published by the Monthly Review Press, the book received positive reviews, praising it as a fair and well-written work that discredited misconceptions about Marx and his work.

== Summary ==
=== Volume I: State and Bureaucracy ===
In this first volume, Draper discusses the attitudes of Marx and Engels towards the titular topics the state and bureaucracy. He focuses on the Marxist theory of the state, how the state came to be, the class whose interests it represents and advocates, and the degree to which the state can be considered autonomous from the class society upon which it rests/developed out of. The position Draper argues for is relatively unique, in that it affords the state a strong degree of autonomy counter to the views of many Marxist theorists, for whom the state either reflects class interests one-for-one or whose autonomy only extends so far as the capitalist class's ultimately tight leash.

=== Volume II: The Politics of Social Classes ===
In this second volume, Draper discusses Marx and Engels's thinking on matters of class. He here focuses on the questions of what Marx and Engels understood classes to be, how these classes contended with one another, how the classes came to understand themselves as a class in the first place, and how these classes relate to society considered in its totality. Despite this, it is not in this volume where Draper dives into the proletarian class-struggle in-depth or the dictatorship of the proletariat. The book is more a study of Marx's views on the history of classes rather than their future, or rather lack thereof.

=== Volume III: The Dictatorship of the Proletariat ===
Here, Draper examines the question of dictatorship as it relates to revolutionary power and violence, commonly referred to as the theory of the dictatorship of the proletariat. Draper explains the often-misunderstood concept of the 'dictatorship of the proletariat,' clarifying what Marx and Engels truly meant by it.

=== Volume IV: Critique of Other Socialisms ===
Draper considers Marx's critical engagement with other thinkers and conceptions of socialism in order to highlight the uniqueness of Marxist socialism. While some of the socialisms considered are well known, such as the anarchisms of Marx's era, others Draper discusses are much less so.

=== Volume V: War & Revolution ===
Ernest Haberkern, Draper's collaborator, completed the manuscript for this volume after Draper's death. It addresses the changing perspectives Marx and Engels held on the relation between revolution and war, spurred by the events of their time.

== Publication history ==
Karl Marx's Theory of Revolution was first published in 1977 by Monthly Review Press.

== Reception ==
Karl Marx's Theory of Revolution has been praised by authors such as the political scientist David McLellan, who described the book as a "splendidly detailed discussion aiming to show that Marx was always right". The book received positive reviews from Mark P. Maller in Library Journal, the economist Robert Heilbroner in The New York Review of Books, The Political Quarterly, Raphael De Kadt in Political Studies, and the Marxian economist Rick Kuhn in the Australian Journal of Political Science. It received a negative review from David Felix in The American Historical Review.

Maller described the work as "helpful and well-written" and less biased than many other books about Marx. He credited Draper with discrediting "some of the myths surrounding Marx's political thought". Heilbroner described the book as stimulating and well-written. He credited Draper with establishing that Marx's views about politics and revolution constitute a theory comparable to his economic theory and were essential to his work, and with showing the merits of Marx's treatment of political life. He believed that Draper was generally fair in assessing the strengths and the weaknesses of Marx's work. However, he criticized Draper for neglecting to discuss Marx's failure to understand political power in relation to human nature. The Political Quarterly wrote that the book showed Draper's knowledge of the work of Marx and Engels, was well-written and sensible, and helpful in understanding the development of Marx's political attitudes and beliefs. It credited Draper with showing that Marx's political theory was "more intricate and more sensible" than most accounts of it have suggested. However, it criticized Draper for being unduly critical of other scholars and for neglecting some relevant scholarly literature.

De Kadt credited Draper with providing a "disciplined and lucid" discussion of the themes of Marx's work and a good discussion of the development of Marx's thought. He described Draper's attempt to clarify the meaning of Marx's arguments as being "among the very best available", and praised his use of obscure as well as well-known sources. However, he suggested that Draper was less confident in discussing philosophy than he was in discussing other topics, and questioned his discussion of Marx's relation to Hegel. He also suggested that Draper was arguably insufficiently critical of Marx, with the result that the work "tends to remain one of accurate exposition rather than critical exegesis."

Kuhn credited Draper with "explaining changes in Marx’s and Engels’s ideas while also demonstrating fundamental continuities in them", thereby making it easier to use Marx's approach to understand new problems and situations, providing "the most systematic account yet written of Marx’s theory of the state" and a fascinating discussion of the term "dictatorship of the proletariat", and discrediting myths about Marx. He described the book as well-written. However, he noted that it included some controversial claims.

Felix argued that Draper failed to focus consistently on a single subject, and that the book "reads like a series of indoctrination talks aimed at Marxists who have some knowledge of Marxian theory but require further elucidation." He criticized Draper for attempting to show that events apparently inconsistent with Marxism were actually consistent with it, and argued that he articulated "a discouraged attitude typical of the Great Depression". He described the work's appendixes as being either "irrelevant or repetitious".
