= Hal Draper =

American socialist activist, scholar and author

Hal Draper (born Harold Dubinsky; September 19, 1914 – January 26, 1990) was an American socialist activist and author who played a significant role in the Berkeley, California, Free Speech Movement. He is known for his extensive scholarship on the history and meaning of the thought of Karl Marx and Marxian socialism.

Draper was a lifelong advocate of what he called "socialism from below", that is, self-emancipation by the working class, in stark opposition to both capitalism and Stalinist or Bolshevik bureaucracy. He was one of the creators of the Third Camp tradition, a form of Marxist socialism emancipated from State apparatus.

== Biography ==
=== Early years ===
Harold Dubinsky was born in Brooklyn, New York, in 1914, the son of Jewish immigrants from Ukraine, then part of the Russian Empire. His father, Samuel Dubinsky (d. 1924), was the manager of a shirt factory. His mother, Annie Kornblatt Dubinsky, ran a candy store to make ends meet following her husband's death. He was one of four children, and Theodore Draper was his older brother.

When Hal was eighteen, his mother insisted upon changing the family name to the "American-sounding" name "Draper" to shield the children from anti-Semitism as they entered their careers.

Hal graduated from Boys High School and earned a bachelor's degree from Brooklyn College in 1934.

=== Political career ===
During his teenage years he joined the Young People's Socialist League (YPSL), then the youth affiliate of the Socialist Party of America, and he became a leader of the national student movements of the day that organized against fascism, war, and unemployment.

Draper's political choices were in contrast to those made by his brother Theodore Draper, a fellow traveler of the Communist Party in the 1930s who would later be disillusioned with Communism and become a prominent historian. Their sister Dorothy (Dora) Draper would marry Jacob Rabkin (1905–2003), one of the intellectual founders of US tax law.

Within the YPSL, Hal Draper was won over to Trotskyism and became an important leader of the YPSL's Trotskyist "Appeal Tendency" during 1936 and 1937. He was elected the organization's national secretary, its top post, at its September 1937 convention, which renounced the Stalinist Third International in favor of a new Trotskyist Fourth International. The great majority of the YPSL supported that position and left or was expelled by the Socialist Party in the fall of that year. Along with his YPSL activity, Draper took part in the founding of the Socialist Workers Party in 1937–1938.

As debates erupted within the newly formed SWP, Draper aligned with those who objected to the internal regime of that party and were developing an analysis of the Soviet Union under Joseph Stalin as a new form of society, neither socialist nor capitalist, in which a new class, the state bureaucracy, held social and state power. In 1940, that faction, led by Max Shachtman, James Burnham, and Martin Abern, split from the SWP to form the Workers Party. Draper joined them in founding the new organization. During the war, he and his wife Anne Draper, the former Anne Kracik, lived in Los Angeles, where they were active among shipyard workers and in antifascist and antiracist campaigns. Returning to New York in the mid-1940s, Draper became a major writer and functionary for the Workers Party. He would often write and edit almost the entire contents of issues of the group's paper, Labor Action.

By 1948, the Workers Party came to believe that the prospects for revolution were receding and that it must adopt a more realistic strategy, given the diminished prospects. Therefore, it changed its name to the Independent Socialist League, an acknowledgement that its size and capacities did not warrant the name "party." With a shrinking membership (although its youth work was buoyant), the ISL leadership around Shachtman decided that the time had come to join forces with the Socialist Party of America, which occurred in 1958. Although Draper personally opposed the decision, he submitted to the majority. He regretted the rightward tendency of the organization, however, and in 1962, Draper, by then resident in Berkeley, California, as a part-time microfilm acquisitions librarian at the University of California, Berkeley, broke with the Socialist Party to form the Independent Socialist Club (ISC), which had a heavy youth composition. During this period, Draper received a master's degree from Berkeley in 1960.

In 1964, Draper was heavily involved in the Free Speech Movement, an important precursor of that decade's New Left, on the Berkeley campus. He was a mentor to leader Mario Savio and others. In the introduction to Draper's Berkeley: The New Student Revolt (1965), Savio acknowledges Draper's encouragement and friendship and cites the influence of Draper's pamphlet The Mind of Clark Kerr (October 1964) on the development of the Free Speech Movement.

In 1968, ISC became the International Socialists as it expanded nationally. Draper left the organization three years later, arguing that the group had become a sect. From then on, he worked as an independent radical scholar, producing a stream of scholarly works on Marxism and the workers' movement.

=== Death ===
Draper died of pneumonia at his home in Berkeley, California, on January 26, 1990.

== Legacy ==
Draper's magnum opus is his five-volume Karl Marx's Theory of Revolution (Monthly Review Press, 1977–1990), a seminal re-evaluation of the whole of Marx's political theory, based on an exhaustive survey of the writings of both Marx and Engels. He saw their political perspective as summarized by the phrase "socialism from below," which he had introduced in his pamphlet The Two Souls of Socialism.

Draper was also the editor of a three-volume Marx-Engels Cyclopedia, detailing the day-to-day activities and writings of the two founders of modern socialism.

Besides his overtly political writings, Draper wrote the short story Ms Fnd in a Lbry, a satire of the information age, in 1961.

In 1982, Draper also published an English translation of the complete poetic works of the 19th-century German poet Heinrich Heine, the fruit of three decades of work conducted alongside his better-known political activity.

== Associations ==
During his life, he was a member of the following organizations:

- Young People's Socialist League
- Socialist Workers Party
- Workers Party
- Independent Socialist League
- Socialist Party of America
- Free Speech Movement
- Independent Socialist Club/International Socialists

He was also a member of the editorial board of New Politics.

== Works ==
- Out of their own mouths: a documentary study of the new line of the Comintern on war New York: Young People's Socialist League, Greater New York Federation, 1935
- Are you ready for war? New York : Young People's Socialist League, 1937
- The truth about Gerald Smith: America's no. 1 fascist San Pedro, Calif: Workers Party, Los Angeles Section, 1945
- Jim Crow in Los Angeles Los Angeles: Workers Party, 1946
- ABC of Marxism: outline text for class and self study Los Angeles: Workers Party, 1946
- Labor, key to a better world Austin, Tex: Young People's Socialist League, 1950–1959?
- The two souls of socialism: socialism from below v. socialism from above New York : Young People's Socialist League, 1963
- Joseph Weydemeyer's "Dictatorship of the proletariat". [n.p.] Labor History, 1962
- Notes on the India–China border war U.S.?: s.n., 1962
- Marx and the dictatorship of the proletariat Paris : I.S.E.A, Cahiers de l'Institut de science économique appliquée #129 Série S; Etudes de marxologie #6 1962
- Introduction to independent socialism; selected articles from Labor action Berkeley, Independent Socialist Press 1963
- The mind of Clark Kerr. [Berkeley, Calif.] Independent Socialist Club 1964
- Independent socialism, a perspective for the left Berkeley, Calif. : Independent Socialist Committee, 1964 Independent Socialist Committee pamphlet #1
- Third camp; the independent socialist view of war and peace policy Berkeley, Calif. : Independent Socialist Committee, 1965 Independent Socialist Committee pamphlet #2
- Berkeley: the new student revolt New York : Grove Press, 1965
- "The Two Souls of Socialism," New Politics, 1966
- Strike!: the second battle of Berkeley : what happened and how can we win (with others) [Berkeley, Calif.? : s.n., 1966
- The fight for independence in Vietnam. Berkeley, Calif. Independent Socialist Club 1966
- Independent socialism and war; articles Berkeley, Calif. Independent Socialist Committee 1966 Independent socialist clippingbooks, #2
- Zionism, Israel, & the Arabs: the historical background of the Middle East tragedy [Berkeley, Calif. : s.n.] 1967 Independent socialist clippingbooks, #3
- The first Israel-Arab war, 1948–49 Berkeley : Independent Socialist Clippingbooks, 1967 Independent Socialist Clippingbooks Xerocopy series #X-2
- The dirt on California; agribusiness and the University [Berkeley, Calif., Independent Socialist Clubs of America, 1968
- Karl Marx & Friedrich Engels: articles in the New American cyclopaedia. Berkeley, Calif. Independent Socialist Press 1969 Independent socialist clippingbooks, #5
- The Permanent war economy Berkeley, Calif. Independent Socialist Press 1970 Independent socialist clippingbooks, #7
- Notebook on the Paris Commune; press excerpts & notes.' by Karl Marx Berkeley, Calif. Independent Socialist Press 1971 (editor) Independent socialist clippingbooks, #8
- Writings on the Paris Commune by Karl Marx New York Monthly Review Press 1971 (editor)
- The Politics of Ignazio Silone: a controversy around Silone's statement "My political faith" : contributions' (with Ignazio Silone, Lucio Libertini and Irving Howe) Berkeley, Calif. Independent Socialist Press 1974 Independent socialist clippingbooks, #10
- Karl Marx's theory of revolution New York : Monthly Review Press, 1977–1990
  - Vol.: 1 - State and bureaucracy New York : Monthly Review Press, 1977
  - Vol.: 2 - The politics of social classes New York : Monthly Review Press, 1978
  - Vol.: 3 - The "Dictatorship of the Proletariat" New York : Monthly Review Press, 1986
  - Vol.: 4 - Critique of other socialisms New York : Monthly Review Press, 1990
- The complete poems of Heinrich Heine: a modern English version by Heinrich Heine Boston: Suhrkamp/Insel; Oxford: Distributed by Oxford University Press 1982
- The annotated Communist manifesto Berkeley, CA: Center for Socialist History 1984
- The adventures of the Communist manifesto Berkeley, CA: Center for Socialist History 1984
- The Marx–Engels Cyclopedia New York : Schocken Books, 1985–1986
  - Vol.: 1 - The Marx–Engels Chronicle: a day-by-day chronology of Marx and Engels' life and activity New York : Schocken Books, 1985
  - Vol.: 2 - The Marx–Engels Register: a complete bibliography of Marx and Engels' individual writings New York : Schocken Books, 1985
  - Vol.: 3 - The Marx–Engels Glossary: Glossary to the Chronicle and Register, and Index to the Glossary New York : Schocken Books, 1986
- The "dictatorship of the proletariat" from Marx to Lenin New York Monthly Review Press 1987
- America as overlord: from Yalta to Vietnam Berkeley, CA: Independent Socialist Press 1989 Draper papers, #1
- Socialism from below Atlantic Highlands, NJ: Humanities Press, 1992
- War and revolution: Lenin and the myth of revolutionary defeatism Atlantic Highlands, NJ: Humanities Press, 1996
- The Hidden History of the Equal Rights Amendment (co-author: Stephen F. Diamond), Center for Socialist History, Berkeley, CA, 2013.

== See also ==
- Socialism from below

== Sources ==
- Geier, Joel. "Socialism from Below: Hal Draper's Contribution to Revolutionary Marxism," International Socialist Review, no. 107 (Winter 2017–18), pp. 87–108.
- Haberkern, Ernest. "Introduction to Hal Draper", Marxists Internet Archive, 1998.
- Higgins, Andrew Stone, From the Free Speech Movement to the Factory Floor: A Collective History of the International Socialists (Haymarket Books, 2026).
- Higgins, Andrew Stone. "Striking the Knowledge Factory" in Higher Education for All: Racial Inequality, Cold War Liberalism, and the California Master Plan (University of North Carolina Press, 2023).
- Johnson, Alan. "Introduction Hal Draper: A Biographical Sketch," Historical Materialism 4, 1 (1999): 181–186, doi: https://doi.org/10.1163/156920699100414364
- Phelps, Christopher. "Draper, Hal," in Encyclopedia of the American Left, 2d ed., ed. Mari Jo Buhle et al. (Oxford University Press, 1996).
- "Hal Draper, 75, Socialist Writer Who Recounted Berkeley Protest," The New York Times, January 31, 1990.
