= New Politics (magazine) =

American socialist magazine

- Editor: Saulo Colón, Dan La Botz, Nancy Holmstrom, Jason Schulman, Julia Wrigley
- Former editors: Julius Jacobson, Phyllis Jacobson
- Categories: Politics
- Frequency: Biannual
- Founder: Julius Jacobson, Phyllis Jacobson
- Founded: 1961; 65 years ago
- First issue: 1961
- Country: United States
- Based in: New York City
- Language: English
- Website: newpol.org
- ISSN: 0028-6494

New Politics is an independent socialist journal founded in 1961 and still published in the United States today. While it is inclusive of articles from a variety of left-of-center positions, the publication is historically associated with a "Neither Washington Nor Moscow!" Third Camp, democratic Marxist perspective, placing it typically to the left of the social democratic views in the journal Dissent.

== Overview ==
Julius and Phyllis Jacobson were the founders and longtime co-editors of the journal, which had a political center of gravity reflective of their youthful formative experience in the Independent Socialist League of the 1940s and 1950s. During the Cold War, New Politics espoused the idea that socialism is indissoluble from democracy and freedom and argued strongly against totalitarian Communist states and authoritarian socialism as corruptions of and departures from the socialist ideal. The journal is perhaps best known for having published the seminal article by Hal Draper, "The Two Souls of Socialism," in 1966. It was also the first English-language publication to publish articles by the dissident Polish socialists Jacek Kuroń and Karol Modzelewski.

The first series of New Politics ran from 1961 through 1976, after which it ceased publication for a decade. The journal was restarted in 1986, publishing two issues per year.

The current co-editors are Saulo Colón, Dan La Botz, Nancy Holmstrom, Jason Schulman, and Julia Wrigley, and its editorial board members are Barry Finger, Thomas Harrison, Michael Hirsch, Micah Landau, Scott McLemee, Stephen R. Shalom, Bhaskar Sunkara, Lois Weiner, and Reginald Wilson. For many years Joanne Landy was a member of the editorial board until her death in 2017.

Contributors have included Michael Albert, Bettina Aptheker, Stanley Aronowitz, Elaine Bernard, Janet Biehl, Ian Birchall, Murray Bookchin, Johanna Brenner, Stephen Eric Bronner, Paul Buhle, Eric Chester, Tony Cliff, Noam Chomsky, Bogdan Denitch, Hal Draper, Martin Duberman, Martin Glaberman, Robin Hahnel, Herbert Hill, Doug Ireland, Staughton Lynd, Sidney Lens, Nelson Lichtenstein, Michael Löwy, Manning Marable, Sean Matgamna, Paul Mattick, Kim Moody, Christopher Phelps, Adolph Reed, David Roediger, Saskia Sassen, Jane Slaughter, Immanuel Wallerstein, Stan Weir, Cornel West, B. J. Widick, Ashley Dawson, Ellen Willis, Kevin B. Anderson, Dan Georgakas, Patrick Bond, Sharon Smith, Christian Parenti, David Bacon, Keeanga-Yamahtta Taylor, Gilbert Achcar and Howard Zinn.
