= Bogdan Denitch =

Serbian-American sociologist

Bogdan Denitch (born Bogdan Denis Denić, Serbian Cyrillic: Богдан Денис Денић; August 9, 1929 – March 28, 2016) was an American sociologist of Serb origin. He was a leading authority on the political sociology of the former Yugoslavia, and served as professor at the Queens College, City University of New York (CUNY) from 1973 until his retirement in 1994. Denitch was active in democratic left politics throughout his life, joining the Young People's Socialist League at age 18, and later co-founding the Democratic Socialists of America. From 1983 through 2004 he organized the annual Socialist Scholars Conference in New York. Beginning in the 1990s he was an advocate for human rights and an opponent of nationalism in the former Yugoslavia.

== Early life ==
Denitch was born in Sofia, Bulgaria, to Serb parents. His father was a Yugoslav diplomat, who was forced into exile by the Nazis and then by Marshal Josip Broz Tito's communist regime after World War II. The family emigrated to the United States in 1946. He enrolled in the City University of New York (then City College) in 1947, and at age 18 joined the Young People's Socialist League (YPSL), then the youth affiliate of the social-democratic Socialist Party of America, led by Norman Thomas. He helped lead that organization into a merger with the Trotskyist-communist Socialist Youth League to form the Young Socialist League in 1954. He learned machinist skills at Metal Trades High School at night while studying at City College, worked as a journeyman machinist and tool and die maker for 13 years, and was an activist in the International Association of Machinists. His machinist union card gave him mobility, and he moved to the San Francisco Bay area in 1958. He was a member of the San Francisco Central Labor Council and was active in the NAACP and CORE from 1948 to 1964.

== Academic career ==
In 1964 Denitch moved to Yugoslavia for five years, where he did field research for several sociological projects on unions and on students for Seymour Martin Lipset of the University of California at Berkeley. In 1968 Denitch secured a major research position for a study of elites in Yugoslavia, through the Bureau of Applied Social Research at Columbia University. He moved back to New York in 1969 to complete work on an MA in sociology at Columbia, awarded in 1970 (the university waived its requirement of a BA degree, which Denitch had never completed). He received a doctorat d'université from University of Paris in 1972 for research on the new working class with Serge Mallet and Lucien Goldman. He completed his PhD in sociology in 1973 at Columbia with his dissertation on Yugoslavian elites. He taught at Yale University in 1972, and moved in 1973 to Queens College, City University of New York, where he remained until his retirement in 1994. He was executive officer of the PhD Program in Sociology at CUNY Graduate Center from 1976 through 1988. He also taught during sabbatical leaves at Birbeck College, University of London in 1979, at the University of Paris in Saint Denis in 1982, at Johns Hopkins University in Bologna in 1980, and at the University of Zagreb in 1973, 1977, and 1988. He was also a visiting research professor at National Autonomous University of Mexico in Mexico City in 1986, 1988 and 1990.

== Political and human rights advocate ==
A long-time associate of the late American socialist leader Michael Harrington, Denitch co-founded the Democratic Socialists of America (DSA) with him in 1982, serving as its representative to the Socialist International and later as an honorary co-chair. He had a close relationship with the Swedish Social Democratic Party and the Mexican Party of the Democratic Revolution (PRD).

In 1991 he created the NGO Transition to Democracy (T.o.D.), which works in the successor states of Yugoslavia for human rights and against nationalism. From 1991 he organized an annual conference, the School on Democracy and Social Justice, for human rights activists from these states. He helped found two democratic socialist parties (now defunct) in Croatia in the 1990s, the Social Democratic Union and Social Democratic Action. Denitch served on the editorial board of the journal Dissent and was a sponsor of the journal New Politics. He was also a member of the advisory board of Novi Plamen magazine.

=== Socialist Scholars Conference ===
In 1983, he founded and chaired the Socialist Scholars Conference, held annually in New York City, until controversy over his leadership led to its suspension and demise in 2005. Upon this point, activists and scholars founded a succeeding annual conference, The Left Forum.

== Personal life ==
Denitch lived in New York City from 1969 until his retirement. In retirement, he spent four months of the year in New York, the other eight months in the former Yugoslavia, where he maintained a home on the island of Brač in Croatia. He was married and had an adult daughter.

== Books authored ==
- Opinion-Making Elites in Yugoslavia. Co-authored with Allen H. Barton and Charles Kadushin (Praeger, 1973). ISBN 978-0-275-28692-7
- The Legitimation of a Revolution: The Yugoslav case (Yale University Press, 1976).
- Society and Social Change in Eastern Europe (Cliff Notes, 1978). ISBN 978-0-8220-1915-2
- Legitimation of Regimes: International Frameworks for Analysis (Sage Publications, 1979). ISBN 978-0-8039-9898-8
- Democratic Socialism: The Mass Left in Advanced Industrial Societies (Allanheld, Osmun, 1981).
- A New Foreign and Defense Policy for the United States (Rowman and Littlefield, 1988). ISBN 978-0-8220-1915-2
- The End of the Cold War: European Unity, Socialism, and the Shift in Global Power (University of Minnesota Press, 1990). ISBN 978-0-8166-1875-0
- Limits and Possibilities: The Crisis of Yugoslav Socialism and State Socialist Systems (University of Minnesota Press, 1990). ISBN 978-0-8166-1844-6
- The Socialist Debate: Beyond Red and Green (Pluto Press, 1990). ISBN 978-0-7453-0381-9
- After the Flood: World Politics and Democracy in the Wake of Communism (Wesleyan, 1992). ISBN 978-0-8195-6256-2
- Ethnic Nationalism: The Tragic Death of Yugoslavia (University of Minnesota Press, 1994). ISBN 978-0-8166-2458-4

Certain of Denitch's books have been translated into French, German, Swedish, Spanish, Slovenian and Serbo-Croat.
