= Stephen Steinberg =

American sociologist

Stephen Steinberg is an American sociologist, currently a distinguished professor at Queens College, who is noted for his work on ethnicity. Recently he has produced a critique on sociology.
