= Max Shachtman =

American labor unionist and political theorist

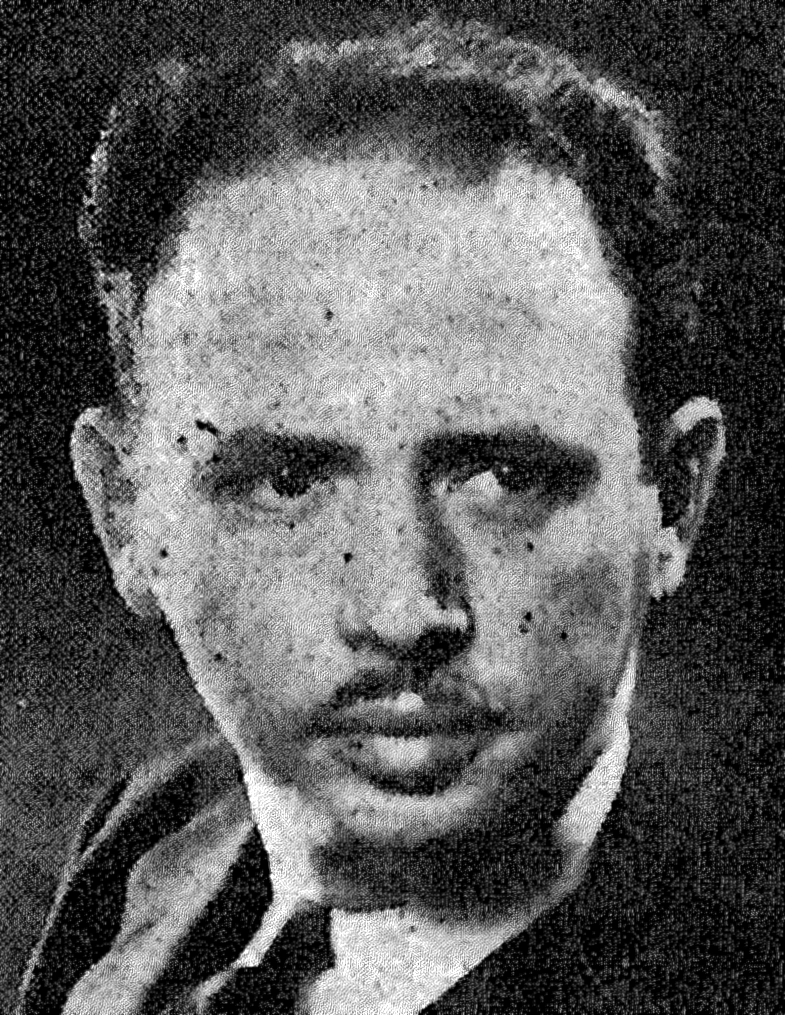
- Shachtman c. 1946
- Born: September 10, 1904; Warsaw, Congress Poland, Russian Empire
- Died: November 4, 1972 (aged 68); Floral Park, New York, U.S.
- Education: City College of New York
- Occupations: Political Theorist; Activist
- Years active: 1921–1972
- Political party: Communist (1921–1928); Communist League (1928–1934); Workers (1934–1936); Socialist (1936–1937; after 1958); Socialist Workers (1937–1940); Workers (1940–1949); Independent Socialist League (1949–1958)
- Spouse: Yetta Barsh (m. 1954)

Max Shachtman (/ˈʃɑːktmən/; September 10, 1904 – November 4, 1972) was an American Marxist theorist. He went from being an associate of Leon Trotsky to a social democrat and mentor of senior assistants to AFL–CIO President George Meany. The Marxist tendency associated with his beliefs is known as Shachtmanism.

== Beginnings ==
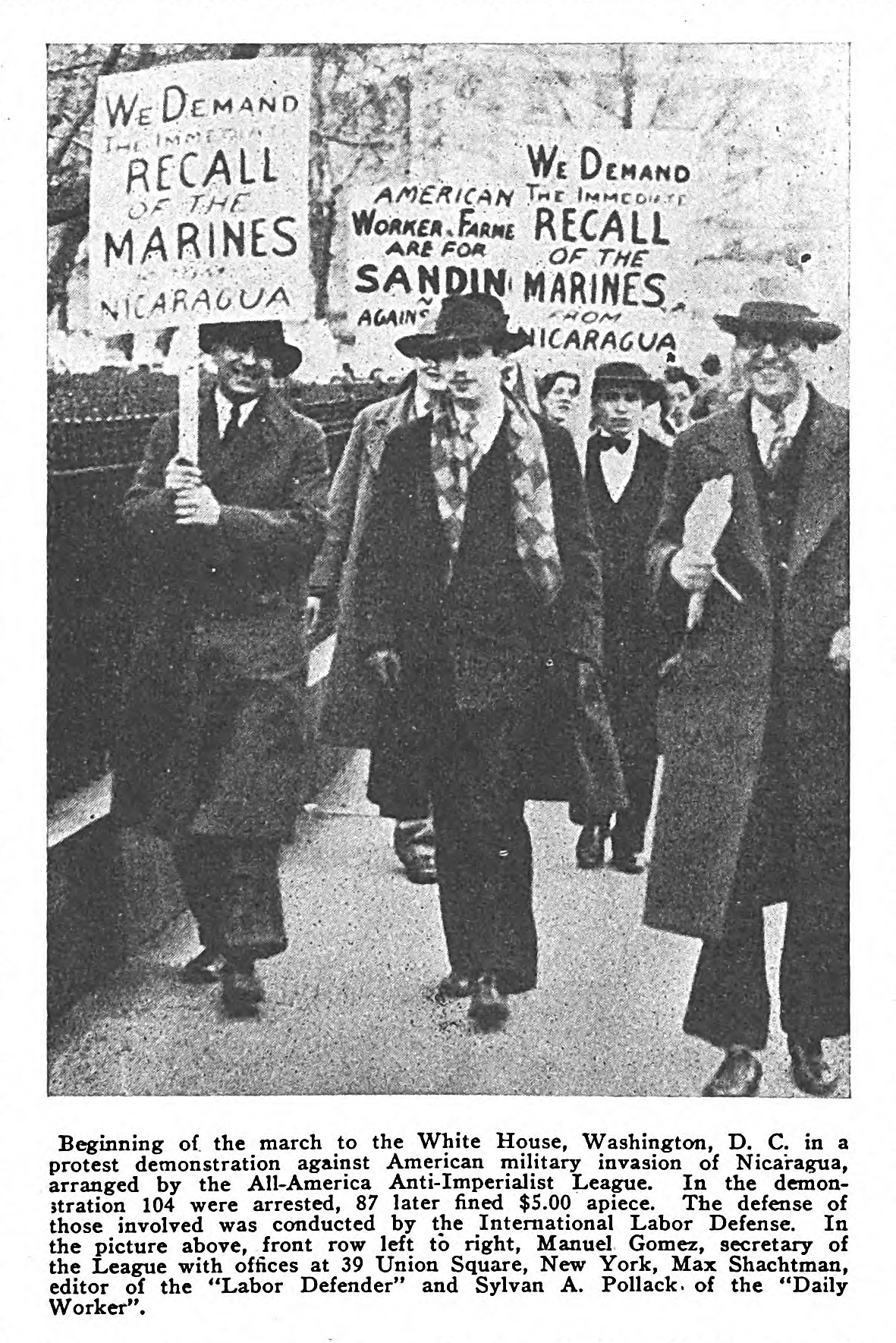
Labor Defender, June 1928

Shachtman was born to a Jewish family in Warsaw, Poland, which was then part of the Russian Empire. He emigrated with his family to New York City in 1905.

At an early age, he became interested in Marxism and was sympathetic to the radical wing of the Socialist Party. Having dropped out of City College, in 1921 he joined the Workers Council, a Communist organization led by J.B. Salutsky and Alexander Trachtenberg which was sharply critical of the underground form of organization of the Communist Party of America. At the end of December 1921 the Communist Party launched a "legal political party," the Workers Party of America, of which the Workers' Council was a constituent member. Shachtman thereby joined the official communist movement by virtue of the Workers' Council's dissolution by merger.

Shachtman was persuaded by Martin Abern to move to Chicago to become an organizer for the communist youth organization and edit the Young Worker. After joining the Communist Party, he rose to become an alternate member of its Central Committee. He edited Labor Defender, a journal of International Labor Defense, which he made the first photographic magazine on the U.S. left. As editor of Labor Defender he fought to save anarchists Nicola Sacco and Bartolomeo Vanzetti from execution, speaking at street-corner meetings that were broken up again and again by police.

Through most of his time in the Communist Party Shachtman, along with Abern, associated with a group led by James P. Cannon. Central in the party leadership from 1923 to 1925 but pushed aside due to the influence of the Communist International (Comintern), the Cannon group became in 1928 supporters of Leon Trotsky.

== Trotskyist leader ==
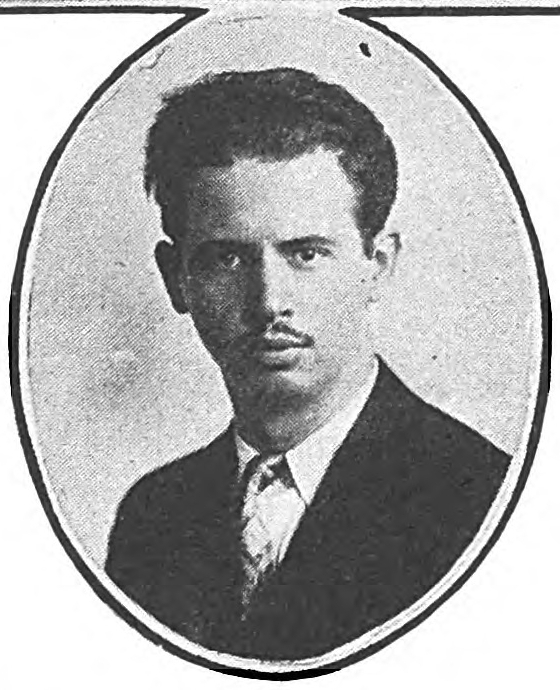
Shachtman c. 1928

Shachtman, Cannon and Abern were expelled from the Communist Party in October 1928 as Joseph Stalin took control of the Comintern. These three and a handful of others formed a group around a newspaper called The Militant. Winning new support, including an important group of trade unionists in Minneapolis, the group shortly thereafter formed the Trotskyist Communist League of America (CLA). As Tim Wohlforth notes, Shachtman was already noted as a talented journalist and intellectual: The Militant listed Shachtman as its managing editor. Shachtman took up a series of positions as a journalist, which allowed him the time and resources to bring the American Trotskyists into contact with their co-thinkers. The CLA often gave him responsibility for contact and correspondence with Trotskyists in other countries. While holidaying in Europe during 1930, he became the first American to visit Trotsky in exile, on an island called Prinkipo in Russian, one of the Princes' Islands near Istanbul, Turkey. He attended the first European conference of the International Left Opposition in April 1930 and represented the CLA on the International Bureau of the ILO.

Shachtman's working relationship with Abern was strengthened in 1929 and 1930. They invited Albert Glotzer, already an old friend and political colleague of Shachtman from their days as leaders of the Communist youth organization, to work with them.

Shachtman's journalistic and linguistic skills allowed him to become a successful popularizer and translator of Trotsky's work and to help found and run the Trotskyists' publishing house, Pioneer Press. He was known for the liberal use of humor and sarcasm in his polemical speeches. A division of labor developed within the CLA in which Cannon led the organization while Shachtman directed its literature and international relations.

=== Differences with Cannon and Trotsky ===
Frictions between Shachtman and Cannon, especially over Shachtman's work when representing the League in Europe, broke out into a factional struggle in 1932. Trotsky and other leaders of the International Left Opposition complained to the CLA that Shachtman had intervened against them within the ILO's fragile European affiliates.

These tensions were amplified by the social differences within the leadership: the older trade unionists supported Cannon; Shachtman and his allies Abern, Albert Glotzer and Maurice Spector were young intellectuals. Stanton and Tabor explain that the CLA's modest progress also increased the frustration between the factions. During this time, Cannon experienced a spell of depression, during which the CLA's organizing secretary was Abern while Shachtman worked on The Militant. Writing in 1936, Shachtman would criticize Abern's habit of nourishing secret cliques of friends and supporters by supplying them with insider information about debates in the League's leadership. Wohlforth's History reports a factional battle upon Cannon's return, in which the Minneapolis branch successfully backed Cannon's return to leadership against Abern and Shachtman. Glotzer's memoir mentions age as a factor: Cannon and other leaders were older than Shachtman, Abern, Maurice Spector, and himself. It was only a sharp intervention by the ILO in 1933 that ended the fight. Although the line-up of opponents largely anticipated Shachtman's 1940 split from the mainstream Trotskyists, the years from 1933 to 1938 restored the co-operation between Cannon and Shachtman.

In 1933, in an internal party document entitled "Communism and the Negro Question," Shachtman dissented from Trotsky's view that Black self-determination was a transitional demand for recruiting Black workers in the United States to a socialist program, a position that was later more fully developed by C.L.R. James. His views, later published by Verso as Race and Revolution in 2003, launched the doctrine of revolutionary integrationism within the U.S. Marxist movement, later to be further developed by Daniel Guérin, Richard S. Fraser, and James Robertson. Race and Revolution was harshly critical of what it saw as white and Black reformism both within and outside the Socialist and Communist Left; it criticized the "petty bourgeois" proposals of major Black figures such as W.E.B. du Bois and NAACP official Walter Francis White, believing they rested on narrow, class-bound visions of Black progress.

=== Workers' Party Merger ===
Early in 1933, Shachtman and Glotzer traveled to Europe. While in Britain, the pair were able to meet with Reg Groves and other members of the recently formed Communist League with whom Shachtman had corresponded. When Trotsky's household moved to France in July 1933, Shachtman accompanied them on their journey from Turkey.

The Trotskyists expanded their role in the U.S. labor movement through their leadership of the 1934 Minneapolis Teamster strike, which broadened into a citywide general strike. Important to the strike's victory was the strike daily The Organizer; although Farrell Dobbs was listed on its masthead as the editor, Shachtman wrote much of it and organized its production. The Trotskyists' role in Minneapolis brought them closer to A. J. Muste's American Workers Party, which had played a similar role in the Toledo general strike that same year.

In 1934, after the CLA merged with the AWP to form the U.S. Workers Party, Shachtman began editing the party's new theoretical journal, New International. During this time, he wrote a notable booklet on the Moscow Trials and translated Leon Trotsky's The Stalin School of Falsification (in 1937) and his Problems of the Chinese Revolution (originally published in 1932).

When the development of the WP was cut short by the rapid growth of the Socialist Party, George Breitman recalls that Shachtman and Cannon successfully proposed that the U.S. Workers Party, should dissolve, so that its members could recruit to Trotskyism from inside the Socialist Party.

=== The Fourth International ===
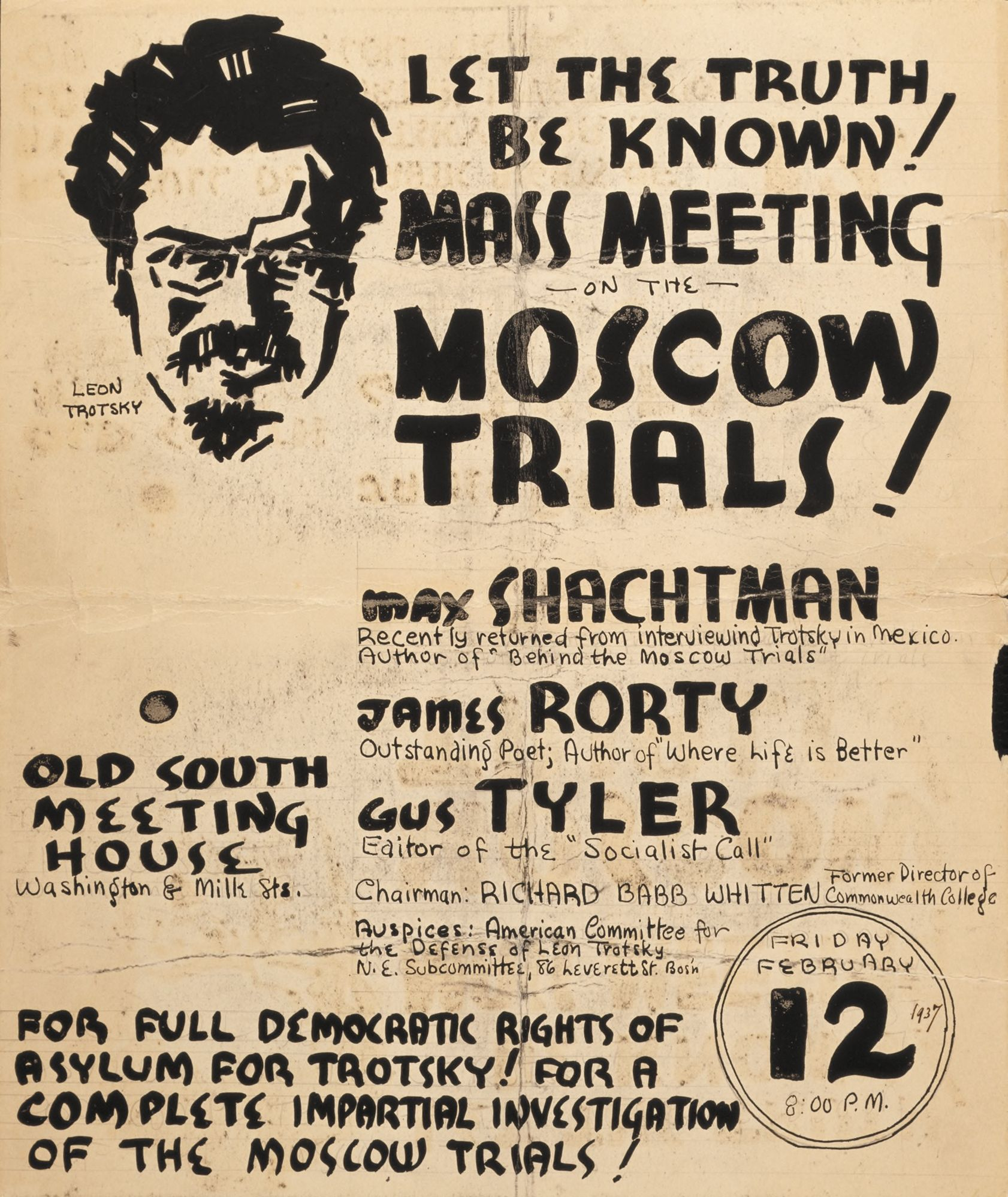
A poster advertising a mass meeting of the American Committee for the Defense of Leon Trotsky at the Old South Meeting House in Boston, Massachusetts, featuring Shachtman, James Rorty and Gus Tyler, c. 1937

After the Trotskyists were expelled from the SP in 1937, Shachtman became a leader of their new organization, the Socialist Workers Party (SWP). Shachtman gave the report on the political situation at the SWP's 1938 convention. The SWP included socialists like James Burnham who had come from A. J. Muste's party rather than from the Trotskyist tradition. At the SWP's founding congress, Burnham proposed that the USSR was no longer a degenerated workers' state: Shachtman spoke for the majority view that it remained a workers' state, and considered it important enough to hold a vote by roll call on the resolution. In March 1938, Shachtman and Cannon were part of a delegation sent to Mexico City to discuss the draft Transitional Program of the Fourth International with Trotsky: they would later teach a series of classes together in New York about the Program.

Shachtman came into closer contact with other left-wing intellectuals in or around the SWP, including James Burnham, Dwight Macdonald and the group around Partisan Review. Shachtman became a focal point for many in the milieu of the New York Intellectuals.

In the same period Shachtman worked with Trotsky on international issues, arranging Trotsky's move from Norway to Mexico and playing a prominent role at several Trotskyist conferences that Trotsky could not attend. When the first congress of the Fourth International met in a village outside Paris in 1938, Shachtman led its presiding committee.

In January 1938, as editor of the SWP weekly, Socialist Appeal, Shachtman had given front-page coverage ("Boss Court Holds Beal on Old Score") to a campaign to prevent recommittal of Fred Beal in North Carolina where he had been convicted in 1929 for conspiracy in the strike-related death of a policeman. Beal, returned from exile in the Soviet Union, had just published a memoir, Proletarian Journey, in which he identified the Soviet party-state bureaucracy as a "new exploiting class", a formula Shachtman was later to adopt.

=== Break with Trotsky ===
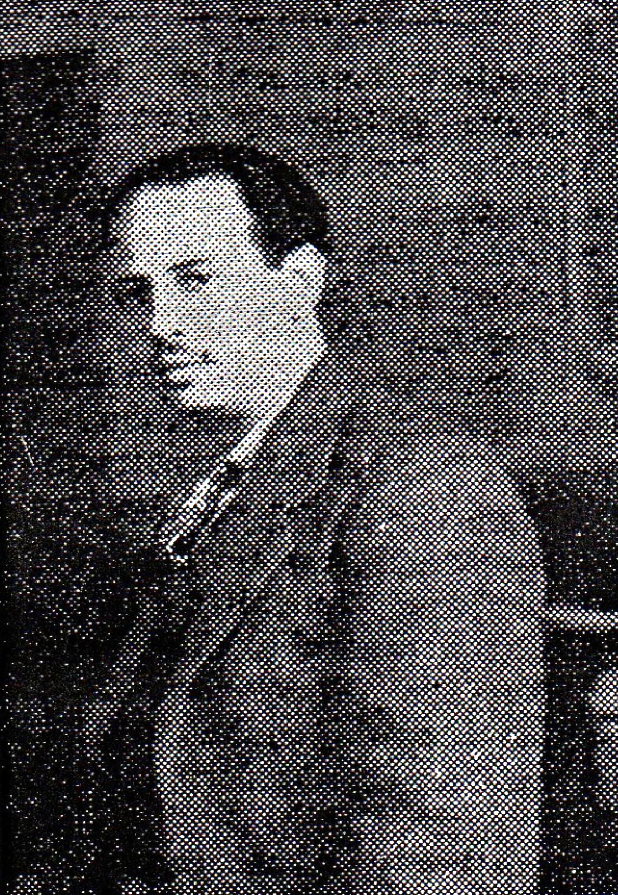
Shachtman c. 1938

In 1938, Shachtman shocked Trotsky by publishing an article in the New International in which James Burnham declared his opposition to dialectical materialism, the philosophy of Marxism. Although Trotsky reassured Shachtman, "I did not deny in the least the usefulness of the article you and Burnham wrote," the issue would soon be revived as Shachtman and Trotsky clashed on the outbreak of World War II.

Following the Molotov–Ribbentrop Pact (August 23, 1939, a non-aggression treaty between Nazi Germany and the Soviet Union), the combined invasion of Poland (September 1 – October 6, 1939) resulted in German and Soviet occupation of Poland. Inside the SWP, Shachtman and James Burnham argued in response that the SWP should drop its traditional position of unconditional defense of the USSR in war. The differences intensified with the outbreak of the Winter War (November 30, 1939 – March 12, 1940), when the Soviet Union invaded Finland. Shachtman and his allies broke with Cannon and the majority of the SWP leadership, which along with Trotsky continued to uphold unconditional critical defense of the USSR.

A bitter dispute opened up in the SWP. The case against Burnham and Shachtman's position is reflected in books by Cannon and Trotsky. Trotsky was especially critical of Shachtman's role as a member of the International Executive Committee of the Fourth International. At the start of World War II, the Fourth International was placed under the control of a resident committee formed by IEC members who happened to be in New York City. Shachtman's tendency held a majority of the resident IEC. Trotsky and others criticized Shachtman for failing to convene the resident IEC or using its authority to reduce the tensions developing in the SWP.

A year into the debate, a special convention was held in April 1940. After the April 1940 convention of the SWP, when Shachtman and his supporters on the new Political Committee refused to a vote on a motion pledging each member to abide by the convention decisions, they were expelled from the party. The minority excluded from the SWP represented 40% of its membership and a majority of the youth group. Even before the Workers Party was formally founded, James Burnham resigned from membership and renounced Marxism, and adopted the position of "evolutionary" or moral socialism. Many of those who had left the SWP did not join the Workers' Party: according to George Novack, a member of the Cannon/Trotsky faction, around half did.

== Political evolution ==
While Cannon and his allies regarded the Soviet Union as a "degenerated workers' state", Shachtman and his party argued that the Stalinist bureaucracy was following an imperialist policy in Eastern Europe. After a four-sided debate in 1940–41 in the new Workers Party between advocates of different theories, a majority concluded that the bureaucracy had become a new ruling class in a society they called "bureaucratic collectivist."

Alongside the WP's paper Labor Action, Shachtman continued to edit New International, the Trotskyist magazine which his supporters had taken with them on resigning from the SWP.

=== The development of the "Third Camp" ===
In the early 1940s, Shachtman further developed the idea, already used by Trotskyists in the 1930s, of a "Third Camp," an independent revolutionary force, made up of the world working class, movements resisting fascism and colonial peoples in rebellion, that would side neither with the Axis nor the Allies. Beginning in 1943, he predicted that the Soviet army would impose Stalinism in Eastern Europe, and added democratic resistance to Stalinism to his conception of the Third Camp. By 1948, Shachtman regarded capitalism and Stalinism to be equal impediments to socialism. Shachtman's Workers Party became active in union struggles. Although its influence in the labor movement remained limited, it played a central role in the fight against the wartime no-strike pledge in the United Auto Workers. Shachtman was present in Grand Rapids for the 1944 UAW convention, helped convince its Rank and File Caucus to stand fast against the no-strike pledge, and felt triumphant when a convention majority voted the pledge down.

In 1949, Shachtman's group dropped its self-description as a "party" and became the Independent Socialist League (ISL). The WP/ISL attracted many young intellectuals, including Michael Harrington, Irving Howe, Hal Draper, and Julius Jacobson. Shachtman also maintained contact with Trotsky's widow, Natalia Sedova, who generally agreed with his views at that time.

During the 1950s, Shachtman's supporters in the UAW abandoned their opposition to President Walter Reuther and increasingly took staff positions at UAW headquarters. As early as 1949 they supported the purge of CP-linked unions from the CIO. Internationally they gave up their identification with the Fourth International after a failed attempt in 1947–48 to reunify with the SWP, and aligned with the left wings of the British Labour Party, other European social democratic parties, and nationalist forces like the Indian National Congress party in colonial and ex-colonial countries. Shachtman and the ISL moved from Leninism to an avowedly Marxist version of democratic socialism. In the same period Shachtman left his second wife and New York City, moving with his third wife, Yetta, to the Long Island suburb of Floral Park.

In 1962, Shachtman published The Bureaucratic Revolution: The Rise of the Stalinist State. This collected and codified Shachtman's key thoughts on Stalinism, and reworked some of his previous conclusions. On the first page of the book's foreword, Shachtman claimed that "Stalinist Russia and all countries of the same structure represent a new social order. I call it bureaucratic collectivism. The name is meant to reject the belief that Stalinist society is in any way socialist or compatible with socialism."

=== Shachtman in the Socialist Party ===
In 1958, the ISL dissolved so that its members could join the Socialist Party, which from its height in the 1910s had fallen in strength to approximately 1,000 members. Shachtman helped pressure the SP to work with the Democratic Party in order to push the Democrats to the left. This strategy was known as "realignment". With the eager participation of the Shachtmanites, the SP took an active role in the early events of the New Left and the Civil Rights Movement. Shachtman developed close and enduring ties to African-American pacifist and civil rights leader Bayard Rustin, and thought up the name for the 1966 Freedom Budget that Rustin developed as director of the A. Philip Randolph Institute. By contrast, Shachtman's initial ties to the young leaders of the Student Nonviolent Coordinating Committee frayed after the 1964 Democratic Convention, when he and his allies backed the Johnson Administration's decision to seat only two delegates from the Mississippi Freedom Democratic Party.

During this time, Shachtman started the research for a major book on the Communist International. Although the book was never completed, his views were collected in a working paper prepared for a 1964 conference of the Hoover Institute at Stanford University. Shachtman's research notes for the book are held at the Tamiment Library.

In 1961 Hal Draper criticized Shachtman's refusal to condemn the Bay of Pigs Invasion, and in 1964 Draper helped to form the Independent Socialist Club. Shachtman favored a negotiated peace settlement rather than a unilateral US withdrawal from the Vietnam War.

=== Death and legacy ===
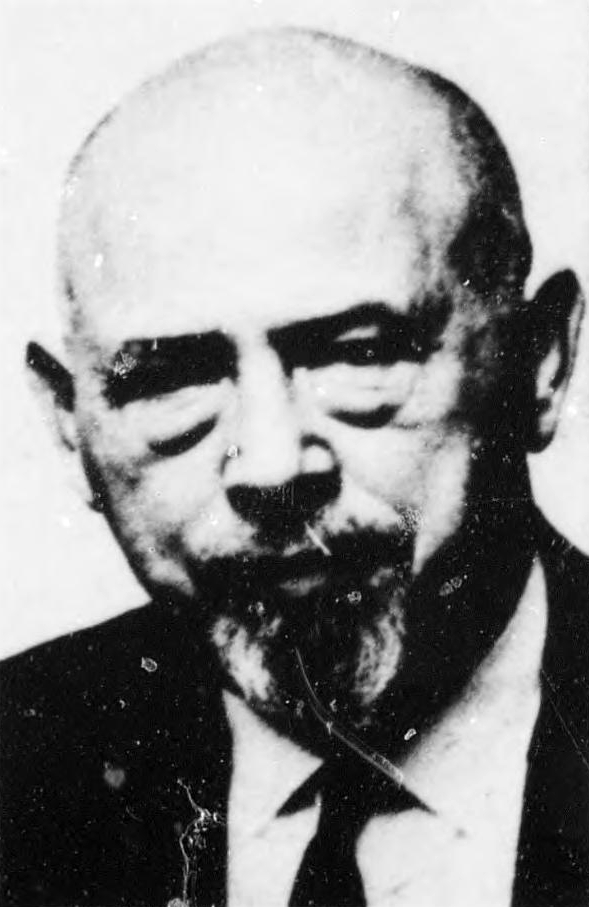
Shachtman c. 1967

Max Shachtman died in Floral Park on November 4, 1972, from coronary failure. He was 68 years old at the time of his death.

Individuals influenced by Shachtman's organisations have shared his opposition to Stalinism. A number of political organizations have emerged from the Trotskyist movement which have considered themselves to be Marxist. This broad tendency is described as "Left Shachtmanism," but does not include followers of Tony Cliff, such as the International Socialist Tendency, as Cliff himself was greatly critical of Shachtman's entire political life and theoretical work.

Glotzer argues that Shachtman's theory of bureaucratic collectivism has also informed unorthodox approaches within Marxism towards the class nature of the Eastern Bloc.

== Yetta Barsh Shachtman ==
Yetta Barsh Shachtman (1915–1996) was married to Max Shachtman and also held Marxist views. Barsh attended Tuley High School in Chicago, where she and her future husband Nathan Gould were chosen to give the commencement address for the class of 1932. They delivered "a fiery attack on the capitalist system replete with quotes from Big Bill Haywood and Eugene Debs".

Barsh was first married to Nathan "Natie" Gould, her high school boyfriend, who was also a Trotskyist activist. Her friends in high school also included the future novelist Isaac Rosenfeld, who shared her interest in radical politics. After obtaining a divorce from Gould, she married Shachtman in 1954.

Barsh worked as the secretary of Albert Shanker, the president of the United Federation of Teachers. The money she earned from this job allowed Shachtman to focus on his political work. While working for Shanker, Barsh was responsible for the hiring of Sandra Feldman and Eugenia Kemble.

She appears in the letters of classmate Saul Bellow who also attended Tuley High School. She graduated in 1932. Bellow delivered a eulogy at her funeral, crediting her with introducing him to politics and Marxism, and describing her as "one of those persons who draw you into their lives and also install themselves in yours".

== Works ==
=== Original writings ===
- Lenin, Liebknecht, Luxemburg Chicago: Young Workers League, 1925
- 1871: The Paris Commune Chicago: Daily Worker, 1926 (The little red library #8)
- Sacco and Vanzetti, Labor's Martyrs New York: International Labor Defense, 1925
- Ten Years: History and Principles of the Left Opposition New York: Pioneer Publishers, 1933; subsequent editions titled Genesis of Trotskyism alternate link 1 alternate link 2
- The Price of Recognition: An Exposure of the Soviet Agreement with the United States, Sydney?: Workers Party of Australia, 1934
- The People's Front: The New Panacea of Stalinism s.l.: Workers Party of Australia, 1935
- Behind the Moscow Trial; The Greatest Frame-Up in History New York: Pioneer Publishers, 1936 alternate link
- For a Cost-Plus Wage New York: The Workers Party, 1943
- The Struggle for the New Course New York: New International Pub. Co., 1943; originally published together with Trotsky's The New Course
- Socialism: The Hope of Humanity New York: New International Pub. Co., 1945
- The Fight For Socialism: The Principles and Program of the Workers Party New York: New International Pub. Co., 1946
- An Open Letter to Dean Acheson: "The Marine Corporal is Right" New York: Socialist Youth League, 1952
- Two Views of the Cuban Invasion (with Hal Draper) Oakland, California, Hal Draper, 1961
- The Bureaucratic Revolution: The Rise of the Stalinist State New York: Donald Press, 1962
- Leon Trotsky on Labor Party: Stenographic Report of Discussion Held in 1938 with leaders of the Socialist Workers Party (with others) New York: Bulletin Publications, 1968
- "Radicalism in the thirties: the Trotskyist view" in As We Saw the Thirties: Essays on Social and Political Movements of a Decade Edited by Rita James Simon. Urbana: University of Illinois Press, 1969
- Marxist Politics or Unprincipled Combinationism? Internal Problems of the Workers Party New York, N.Y.: Prometheus Research Library, 2000 (reprint of internal documents from the 1930s)
- Dog Days: James P. Cannon vs. Max Shachtman in the Communist League of America 1931–1933 New York, N.Y.: Prometheus Research Library, 2002
- Race and Revolution (edited by Christopher Phelps) London: Verso, 2003

=== Translations and editions ===
- The Strategy of the World Revolution by Leon Trotsky, New York, Communist League of America, 1930 (with introduction)
- Problems of the Development of the U.S.S.R.: Draft of the Thesis of the International left Opposition on the Russian Question by Leon Trotsky, New York, Communist League of America, 1931 (with Morris Lewitt)
- Communism and Syndicalism: On the Trade-Union Question by Leon Trotsky, New York, Communist League of America, 1931
- The Permanent Revolution by Leon Trotsky, New York, Pioneer Publishers, 1931
- Distant Worlds: The Story of a Voyage to the Planets by Friedrich Wilhelm Mader, New York, Charles Scribner's Sons, 1931
- Problems of the Chinese Revolution by Leon Trotsky, New York, Pioneer Publishers, 1932 (with introduction)
- The Only Road by Leon Trotsky, New York, Pioneer Publishers, 1933 (with B.J. Field)
- Paris on the Barricades by George Spiro New York, Spartacus Youth League of America, 1935 (Introduction)
- The Selected Works of Leon Trotsky 2v. (general editor), New York, Pioneer Publishers, 1936–1937
- In Defense of the Soviet Union by Leon Trotsky, New York, Pioneer Publishers, 1937 (with introduction)
- Destiny of a Revolution by Victor Serge, London: National Book Association, 1937 (published in America as Russia Twenty Years After New York, Hillman-Curl, Inc.)
- The Stalin School of Falsification by Leon Trotsky, New York, Pioneer Publishers, 1937 (introduction and notes only)
- Terrorism and Communism: A Reply to Karl Kautsky by Leon Trotsky, Ann Arbor: University of Michigan Press, 1961 (introduction only)
