= Christopher Phelps =

American historian

Christopher Phelps (born 1965) is an American political and intellectual historian of the twentieth century. The subjects of his research and writing include philosophical pragmatism, class and labor in social thought, the American Left, and race and sexuality in American history. He teaches in the department of American and Canadian Studies at the University of Nottingham in England.

== Books ==
=== Sole author ===
- Young Sidney Hook: Marxist and Pragmatist, Cornell University Press, 1997; 2d ed., University of Michigan Press, 2005.

=== Co-authored ===
- Radicals in America: The US Left Since the Second World War, Cambridge University Press, 2015.

=== Edited or introduced ===
- Marxism and America: New Appraisals, University of Manchester, 2021.
- The Jungle, by Upton Sinclair, Bedford/St. Martin's, 2005.
- Race and Revolution, by Max Shachtman, Verso, 2003.
- Towards the Understanding of Karl Marx, by Sidney Hook, Prometheus, 2002.
- From Hegel to Marx, by Sidney Hook, Columbia University Press, 1994.

== Selected articles ==
- "The Novel of American Authoritarianism," Science & Society, 2020
- "Heywood Broun, Benjamin Stolberg, and the Politics of American Labor Journalism in the 1920s and 1930s," Labor: Studies in Working-Class History, 2018
- "The Sexuality of Malcolm X," Journal of American Studies, 2017
- "The Closet in the Party: The Young Socialist Alliance, the Socialist Workers Party, and Homosexuality, 1962 – 1970," Labor: Studies in Working-Class History, 2013
- "Dream Sequences: Marching on Washington Fifty Years On," Dissent Online, 2013
- "Herbert Hill and the Federal Bureau of Investigation," Labor History, 2012
- "Port Huron at Fifty: The New Left and Labor: An Interview with Kim Moody," Labor: Studies in Working-Class History, 2012
- "The Strike Imagined: The Atlantic and Interpretive Voyages of Robert Koehler's Painting The Strike," Journal of American History, 2011
- "The New SDS," The Nation, 2007
- "Solidarność in Łódź: An Interview with Zbigniew Marcin Kowalewski," International Labor and Working-Class History, 2008
- "A Neglected Document on Socialism and Sex," Journal of the History of Sexuality, 2007
- "The Fictitious Suppression of Upton Sinclair's The Jungle," History News Network, 2006
- "A Socialist Magazine in the American Century," Monthly Review, 1999
- "Bourne Yet Again", on the legacy of Randolph Bourne, New Politics, 1998
- "History as Social Criticism: Conversations with Christopher Lasch," Journal of American History, 1994
