= Third camp =

Branch of socialism

The third camp, also known as third camp socialism or third camp Trotskyism, is a branch of socialism that aims to oppose both capitalism and Stalinism by supporting the organised working class as a "third camp".

The term arose early during World War II and refers to the idea of two "imperialist camps" competing to dominate the world: one led by the United Kingdom and France and supported by the United States, and the other led by Nazi Germany and Japan and supported by Fascist Italy. It did have a predecessor in the Trotskyist opposition to the Stalin-led Soviet Union, however.

== Origins of the term ==
From the 1930s and beyond, Leon Trotsky and his American supporter James P. Cannon described the Soviet Union as a "degenerated workers' state", the revolutionary gains of which should be defended against imperialist aggression despite the emergence of a gangster-like ruling stratum, the party bureaucracy. While defending the Russian revolution from outside aggression, Trotsky, Cannon and their followers at the same time urged an anti-bureaucratic political revolution against Stalinism to be conducted by the Soviet working class themselves.

Dissidents in the Trotskyist Socialist Workers Party, witnessing the collaboration of Joseph Stalin and Adolf Hitler in the invasion and the partition of Poland and the Soviet invasion of the Baltic states, argued that the Soviet Union had actually emerged as a new social formation, which was neither capitalist nor socialist. Adherents of that view, espoused most explicitly by Max Shachtman and closely following the writings of James Burnham and Bruno Rizzi, argued that the Soviet bureaucratic collectivist regime had in fact entered one of two great imperialist "camps" aiming to wage war to divide the world. The first of the imperialist camps, which Stalin and the Soviet Union were said to have joined as a directly participating ally, was headed by Nazi Germany and included most notably Fascist Italy. In that original analysis, the "second imperialist camp" was headed by England and France, actively supported by the United States.

Shachtman and his cothinkers argued for the establishment of a broad "third camp" to unite the workers and colonial peoples of the world in revolutionary struggle against the imperialism of the German-Soviet-Italian and the Anglo-American-French blocs. Shachtman concluded that the Soviet policy was one of imperialism and that the best result for the international working class would be the defeat of the Soviet Union in the course of its military incursions. Conversely, Trotsky argued that a defeat for the Soviet Union would strengthen capitalism and reduce the possibilities for political revolution.

With the demise of fascism in World War II and the emergence of Soviet-controlled governments in Central and Eastern Europe, the "three camps" conception was modified. The leading imperialist camp was held to be that of the chief capitalist powers (the United States, the United Kingdom and France), with the Soviet Union consigned to a second imperialist camp.

Over time, Shachtman's aggressive calls for the defeat of official communist nations' expansionism (the second camp) drifted rightward into support for the capitalist nations (the first camp). That position has led orthodox Trotskyist groups to declare it reactionary. However, some supporters of the three camps analysis split with Shachtman and continued to develop their analyses of the changing world situation.

== Organizational support ==
The Congress Socialist Party of India also adopted a third camp position, with the slogan "We want neither the rule of London or Berlin; nor the rule of Paris or Rome; nor that of Tokyo or Moscow" (September 1939).

A third camp position is held today by the Workers Liberty groups, New Politics and by some in the multi-tendency Marxist organization Solidarity in the United States as well as some in the Democratic Socialists of America and the Socialist Party USA.

== Other uses of the term ==
More recently, a movement by the Worker-Communist Party of Iran and its leaders such as Hamid Taqvaee and Maryam Namazie, together with groups including Left Worker-communist Party of Iraq, has emerged calling for a third camp opposing American militarism and Islamic terrorism. However, this is unrelated to the Trotskyist third camp theory as neither organisation comes from a Trotskyist background.

== See also ==
- Anti-Stalinist left
- Centrism
- Council communism
- Left communism
- Neoconservatism
- Non-Aligned Movement
- Shachtmanism
- Three Worlds Theory
