= Art Kunkin =

American journalist (1928–2019)

- Born: Arthur Glick Kunkin; March 28, 1928; The Bronx, New York City, New York, U.S.
- Died: April 30, 2019 (aged 91); Joshua Tree, California
- Education: Bronx High School of Science; New School for Social Research
- Occupations: Community organizer, Machinist, Editor, Publisher
- Employer(s): Ford Motor Company and General Motors (1950s)
- Known for: Los Angeles Free Press; New Age esotericism
- Other political affiliations: Trotskyism
- Spouses: Abby Addis Rubenstein (divorced) Valerie (Velinka) Porter Stancin (divorced) Elaine Wallace (m. 2014; died 2017)
- Children: Anna Kunkin and April Fountain

Arthur Glick Kunkin (March 28, 1928 – April 30, 2019) was an American journalist, community organizer, machinist, and New Age esotericist best known as the founding publisher and editor of the Los Angeles Free Press.

== Early life and education ==
Born in The Bronx in New York City to Irving and Bea Kunkin, Art Kunkin attended the prestigious Bronx High School of Science and the New School for Social Research.

== Political organizer ==
Kunkin trained as and became a tool and die maker. He joined the Trotskyist movement as an organizer for the Socialist Workers Party, where he was business manager of the SWP paper The Militant.

Beginning in the late 1940s, he was associated with C.L.R. James and the radical Marxist Johnson–Forest Tendency. During the 1950s, he was the Los Angeles editor of their journals Correspondence and News & Letters, while working as a master machinist and tool and die maker for Ford Motor Company and General Motors. During this period, several theoreticians and organizers of the Johnson-Forest trend (including Raya Dunayevskaya, Martin Glaberman, Grace Lee Boggs and James Boggs) were concentrated in the auto industry in Detroit, where they worked to recruit Black workers and gain influence in the auto workers' unions. In 1962, Kunkin left General Motors to return to college and obtain a graduate degree.

Soon afterwards, he moved to the West Coast, where he had his first experience with a local newspaper, on the staff of a Los Angeles Mexican-American paper, the East L.A. Almanac. "For the first time in my life I was writing about garbage collection and all kinds of community problems," he later recalled. Meanwhile, he was also doing political radio commentaries for KPFK Pacifica Radio and serving as the Southern California district leader of the Socialist Party.

== Los Angeles Free Press ==
In May 1964 he produced the first issue of the Los Angeles Free Press, a one-time edition distributed at the Renaissance Pleasure Faire and May Market, a fund-raising event for KPFK. The response was favorable enough for him to start publishing the Freep (as it came to be called) regularly, starting in July.

The paper's core volunteers and supporters included people from KPFK, the bohemian crowd that hung out at the Papa Bach bookstore, and The Fifth Estate, a Sunset Strip coffee house that provided office space for the Freep in its basement. The paper soon became a nerve center of the burgeoning hippie scene. The atmosphere there was described by a reporter for Esquire: "Kids, dogs, cats, barefoot waifs, teeny-boppers in see-through blouses, assorted losers, strangers, Indian chiefs wander in and out, while somewhere a radio plays endless rock music and people are loudly paged over an intercom system. It's all very friendly and rather charming and ferociously informal."

Launched on a shoestring budget, the Free Press struggled for years. By 1969 circulation had exploded to 100,000 copies, but legal problems stemming from the publication of a list of names of undercover drug agents put it in a precarious financial position just as it was expanding its operations to include a printing plant, a typesetting firm, and a small chain of bookstores. Underpaid staff members left in two waves of defections to form the competing newspapers Tuesday's Child and The Staff. By 1972 Kunkin and the paper were deep in debt to the pornographers whose advertising had been the source of its profits. Kunkin lost control of the paper and was fired, rehired, and fired again, as the paper spiraled slowly into oblivion, paralleling the nationwide decline of the underground press.

== Later Freep revival attempts ==
Immediately after losing the Free Press, Kunkin started another competing paper called the Los Angeles Weekly News, with much the same tone as the original Free Press — and many original contributors. A writer for the American Library Association's Social Responsibilities Round Table newsletter had this to say about the firing of Kunkin and his subsequent startup of the Los Angeles Weekly News:

It can be put succinctly: the old Los Angeles Free Press, pioneer "underground" rag..., is DEAD. To clarify: it's still published weekly. But it ain't the same; ...the tabloid's become a money-grubbing, almost colorless rival to the L.A. Times. Moreover, the publishers dismissed founder-editor Art Kunkin, who however "freaky" and mercuric — is a guy who can write and who's definitely got what might be termed "alternative soul." ... Yet there's a redeeming aspect to this otherwise grim scene, for Kunkin didn't just stagger whimperingly away. instead, with much of the original Freep staff, he began a new sheet, the LOS ANGELES WEEKLY NEWS, which ... continues the Freep's muckraking tradition.... So the old Freep is "dead" but lately reborn as the alive-and-scrapping WEEKLY NEWS. The "message" here for libraries is that if they've been dutifully subscribing to the Free Press as a genuine example of counter-culture journalism, they'd be well-advised to drop that sub, replacing it with the WEEKLY NEWS....

Despite this endorsement, the LA Weekly News didn't last, however, going out of business after only three or four issues.

In November 1995, early in the development of the World Wide Web, Kunkin founded the World Wide Free Press, an online news aggregator of progressive political content.

In 1999 and 2005–2007, he was involved with short-lived revivals of the Los Angeles Free Press.

== New Age activities ==
Kunkin's post-Free Press career began in 1977 with a stint as a professor of journalism at California State University, Northridge.

He went on to study meditation with Kahuna priests, Dervish Sufis, and ultimately Andrew Da Passano, a Russian-born Italian who taught techniques based on Tibetan Buddhism shared with Russia by emissaries of the 13th Dalai Lama. In 1978, Kunkin and Da Passano opened the Temple of Esoteric Science.

In 1979, Kunkin began a seven-year apprenticeship in alchemy at the Paracelsus Research Society in Salt Lake City, where he edited their journal Essentia.

In 1985, he inherited the library of occultist, ceremonial magician, and writer Israel Regardie.

In 1986, Paul Andrews and Kunkin purchased the holistic magazine Whole Life Times and partnered in running the Whole Life Expo.

Kunkin was president of the Philosophical Research Society in Los Angeles 1991-1992, an esoteric mystical group founded by Manly P. Hall, and taught laboratory alchemy onsite. He later became a lecturer in alchemy and other New Age topics at the Institute for Mentalphysics retreat center near Joshua Tree, and a columnist for the Desert Valley Star.

In 2008, The International Alchemy Guild gave Kunkin an honorary lifetime membership. In 2009, he published a radical reinterpretation of the philosopher's stone formula in Volume 1 of the unfinished five-ebook series Alchemy: The Secrets of Immortality Finally Revealed.

== Personal life and death ==
Kunkin was married three times. His first wife was painter Abby Rubinstein (née Addis), with whom he had two daughters, Anna Kunkin and April Fountain. After they divorced, he married Valerie Porter. His third wife was Elaine Wallace, who died in 2017.

Kunkin died in Joshua Tree, California, on April 30, 2019, at the age of 91.
