= Facing Reality =

1960's Radical Left Group

Facing Reality was a radical left group in the United States that existed from 1962 until 1970.

== History ==
Facing Reality originated in the Johnson–Forest Tendency led by C. L. R. James and Raya Dunayevskaya. It has its origins in the Trotskyist left but regarded the Soviet Union as state capitalist. By 1951, the Johnson–Forest Tendency had left the Trotskyist left to form its own organization known as Correspondence Publishing Committee. C. L. R. James was forced to leave the USA in the early 1950s, and Correspondence was split. The faction that stayed loyal to C .L. R. James retained the name the Correspondence Publishing Committee and continued to receive advice from James from Britain, while a significant number supported Raya Dunayevskaya and split to form a new group, News and Letters Committees, which publishes a monthly newspaper, News & Letters, that remains in print today.

In 1962, there was a further split as Grace Lee Boggs, James Boggs, Freddy Paine, and Lyman Paine abandoned the politics of C.L.R. James for an eclectic politics that was third worldist, while keeping the organization's name. The small number of members that continued to endorse the politics of James took the name Facing Reality, after the 1958 book by James co-written with Grace Lee Boggs and Pierre Chaulieu, a pseudonym for Cornelius Castoriadis, on the Hungarian working class revolt of 1956. Facing Reality was based primarily in Detroit and published a monthly newsletter, Speak Out, as well as pamphlets by James and other leading Facing Reality figures such as Martin Glaberman. They include Negro Americans Take the Lead: A Statement on the Crisis in American Civilization in 1964 and Mao as Dialectician by Martin Glaberman, as well as James' Marxism and the Intellectuals in 1963 and Lenin, Trotsky, and the Vanguard Party in 1964. In 1967, four key leading members — C.L.R. James, Martin Glaberman, William Gorman, and George Rawick — of Facing Reality collaborated to write the pamphlet The Gathering Forces, a document some, such as Kent Worcester, have characterized as representing the influence of Maoism even in Facing Reality. Martin Glaberman, however, has disputed this claim in a review of Worcester's book in Against the Current magazine.

== Political impact ==
Facing Reality had a particular, if small, impact among African American political activists at Wayne State University in Detroit and in auto plants in the city. A community paper, Inner City Voice, published articles by James in the late 1960s. Glaberman taught a class on Karl Marx's Capital to many of the staff of the Inner City Voice. Numerous members of this group were also active in the Dodge Revolutionary Union Movement. In 1970, the group was dissolved at the suggestion of Glaberman over James's objections on the grounds that it was too small to have an impact.

The group had a broader international influence as well, including in Italy's burgeoning "autonomous" communist movement.

== Sources ==
- Martin Glaberman 1918–2001
- Learning from Autonomous Marxism
- Martin Glaberman, "C.L.R. James: A Recollection", New Politics #8 (Winter 1990): 78–84.
- Kent Worcester, C.L.R. James: A Political Biography (Albany: State University of New York, 1996).
