= Martin Glaberman =

American leftist historian (1918–2001)

- Born: December 3, 1918
- Died: December 17, 2001 (aged 83); Detroit, Michigan, U.S.
- Occupations: Professor, historian, journalist, auto worker

Academic background
- Education: Union Graduate School, University of Detroit, Columbia University

Martin Glaberman (December 13, 1918 – December 17, 2001) was an American Marxist historian, academic, and writer on labor matters, as well as a former autoworker.

== Biography ==
Glaberman was associated with the Johnson-Forest Tendency, a radical left group that split from the Trotskyist Socialist Workers Party over doctrinal differences. Glaberman's group understood the Soviet Union as a state capitalist society, whereas the Socialist Workers Party labeled the USSR a bureaucratic collectivist society, also referred to as a degenerated workers' state.

In 1950, the Johnson-Forest Tendency left the Trotskyist movement and became known as the Correspondence Publishing Committee. When this group suffered a split in 1955 with a large number supporting Raya Dunayevskaya (or "Forest" of "Johnson-Forest") and forming a new group called the News and Letters Committees, Glaberman remained loyal to C. L. R. James ("Johnson") and the Correspondence group. James advised Correspondence from exile in Britain. It remains a matter of dispute whether the majority in 1955 supported James or Dunayevskaya. Glaberman claimed in New Politics that the majority supported James, but historian Kent Worcester claimed the opposite in an important biography of C. L. R. James.

In 1962, when Grace Lee Boggs, James Boggs, Lyman Paine, and Freddy Paine split from Correspondence Publishing Committee to move in a Maoist/Third Worldist direction, Glaberman and a small number of other activists, largely based in Detroit, remained loyal to C. L. R. James and started a new group, Facing Reality, to continue James's legacy. Glaberman was a leader of Facing Reality until he proposed its dissolution in 1970, over the objections of James. Glaberman felt the group was too tiny to operate effectively.

He continued to write and publish until his death. He established a now-defunct publishing company, Bewick Editions, to keep James' work in print. Glaberman was for many years a sponsor of New Politics and served as an associate editor of Radical America, along with individuals such as Paul Buhle.

Glaberman has been described as a legendary figure in Detroit radical circles, and he influenced activists who would play a major role in the Dodge Revolutionary Union Movement and League of Revolutionary Black Workers. He was a professor and later a professor emeritus at Wayne State University as he resumed his academic path after retiring from factory work.

== Bibliography ==
=== Books ===
- Wartime Strikes: The Struggles Against the No-Strike Pledge in the UAW during World War Two, Bewick Editions 1980, Detroit, Michigan. ISBN 978-0935590111.
- Marxism for Our Times: C.L.R. James on Revolutionary Organisation (editor), University Press of Mississippi 1999, ISBN 978-1578061518.
- with Staughton Lynd: Punching Out. Selected Writings of Martin Glaberman. Charles H. Kerr Press, Chicago, IL 2004, ISBN 0-88286-263-4.

=== Pamphlets ===
- Punching Out (1952)
- Union Committeemen and Wildcat Strikes (1955)
- Negro Americans take the Lead - A Statement on the Crisis in American Civilization (1964)
- Be His Payment High or Low: The American Working Class of the 1960s (1965)
- Mao as Dialectician (1971)
- The Working Class and Social Change (1975)
- Working for Wages: The Roots of Insurgency(1999) (co-authored)

=== Personal papers, archives ===
The Martin and Jessie Glaberman Papers at the Walter P. Reuther Library in Detroit, Michigan, contain more than 30 linear feet of archival material related to the life and work of the Glabermans. Documents, "reflect their many years of involvement in the labor, civil rights and women's movements. Material includes correspondence, radical publications, speeches, and interviews on their involvements and interests such as the Correspondence Publishing Committee/Company, C.L.R.James and the Socialist Workers Party." The collection is open for research.

== Sources ==
- Kent Worcester, C.L.R. James: A Political Biography (Albany: State University of New York Press, 1996)
