= Walter P. Reuther Library =

Library at Wayne State University

Walter P. Reuther Library, Archives of Labor and Urban Affairs
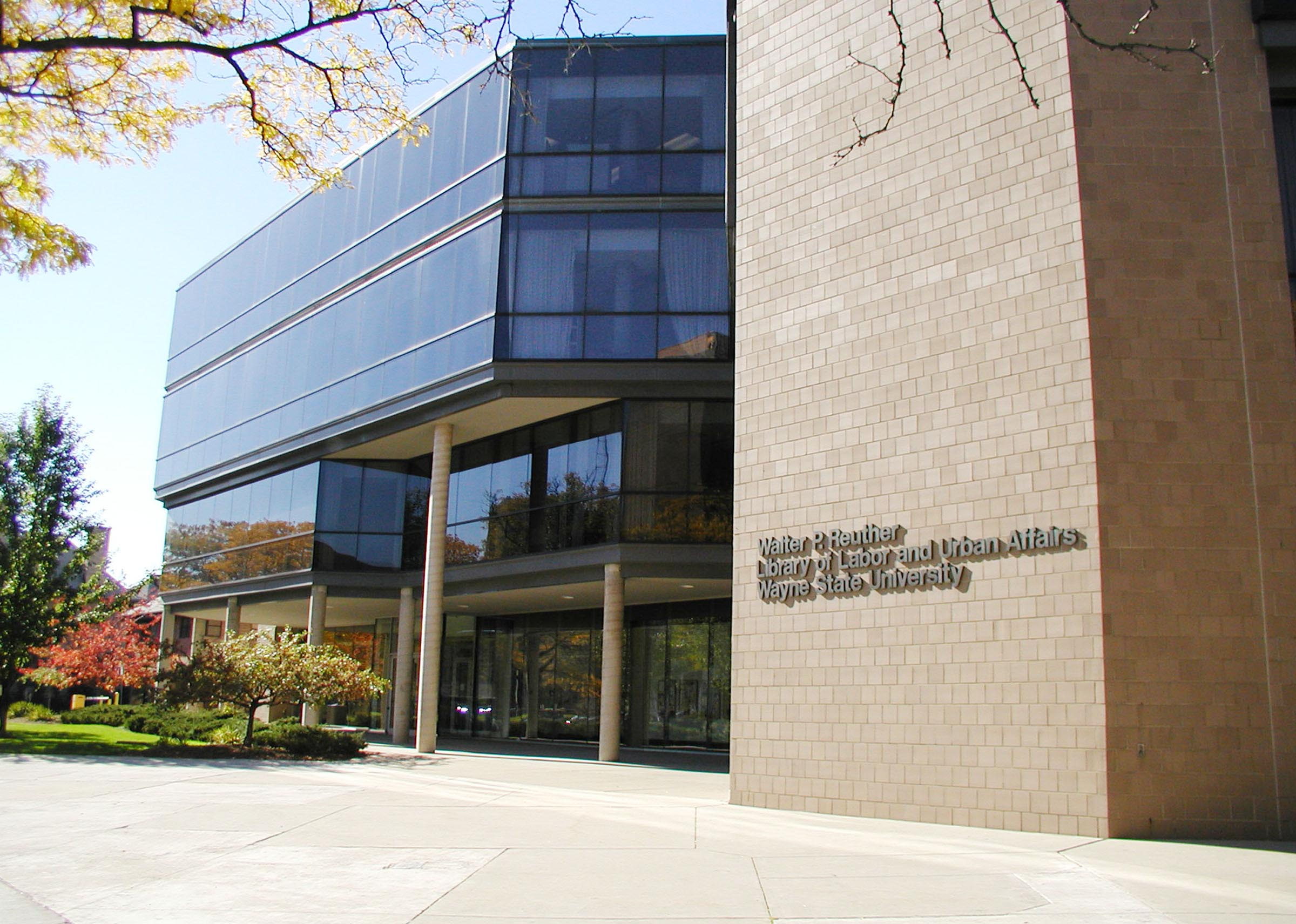
- A view of the Walter P. Reuther Library, Archives of Labor and Urban Affairs in Detroit, Michigan
- Interactive map of the Walter P. Reuther Library, Archives of Labor and Urban Affairs area

General information
- Status: Active
- Type: Library
- Location: 5401 Cass Avenue, Detroit, Michigan, US
- Coordinates: 42.35885°N 83.06899°W
- Completed: 1975
- Owner: Wayne State University

Technical details
- Floor count: 4

Design and construction
- Architecture firm: O'Dell, Hewlett and Luckenbach

Website
- reuther.wayne.edu

The Walter P. Reuther Library, Archives of Labor and Urban Affairs, located on the campus of Wayne State University in Detroit, Michigan, contains millions of primary source documents related to the labor history of the United States, urban affairs, and the Wayne State University Archives. The building is named for UAW President and Congress of Industrial Organizations President Walter Reuther.

== History ==
The Walter P. Reuther Library of Labor and Urban Affairs was established at Wayne State University in 1960 to collect and preserve original documents related to the American labor movement. The library is named for early United Auto Workers organizer and president Walter Reuther. For over thirty years, the library's collections grew under the leadership of director Philip P. Mason. In 1975, a dedicated building was constructed for the library, using funds donated by the UAW and a grant from the United States Department of Health, Education, and Welfare. Architectural firm O'Dell, Hewlett and Luckenbach designed the initial construction. In 1991, the library's Leonard Woodcock Wing was completed, which added over 26,000 square feet (2,400 m^{2}) to the building.

== Collections ==
=== Labor records ===
The Reuther Library is the home of the largest labor archives in the United States, and contains over 75,000 linear feet of archival holdings, including paper and digital manuscript material, photographic prints and negatives, oral histories, audio recordings, and motion picture recordings.

The library serves as the official archival repository for the following unions:

- Air Line Pilots Association (ALPA)
- American Federation of State, County and Municipal Employees (AFSCME)
- American Federation of Teachers (AFT)
- Brotherhood of Maintenance of Way Employes division of the International Brotherhood of Teamsters
- Graphic Communication Conference of the International Brotherhood of Teamsters
- Industrial Workers of the World (IWW)
- National Association of Letter Carriers (NALC)
- The Newspaper Guild
- Service Employees International Union (SEIU)
- United Auto Workers (UAW)
- United Farm Workers (UFW)

The archives also collects material related to the Coalition of Labor Union Women, the Coalition of Black Trade Unionists, the Workers Defense League and numerous labor-related organizations, especially those active in the Detroit area.

Researchers can access personal papers from labor activists and union leaders at the Reuther Library, including collections from Cesar Chavez, Jerry Wurf, Walter P. Reuther, Leonard Woodcock, James and Grace Lee Boggs, Utah Phillips, Dolores Huerta, Jessie and Martin Glaberman, Raya Dunayevskaya and many others.

Oral histories document the work of union leaders and rank-and-file members. Notable oral history collections include "Rosie the Riveter Revisited: Women and the WWII Work Experience," and "Blacks in the Labor Movement."

Many of the library's collections document the lives of working people and were not created by labor unions. Some of these include records related to the civil rights movement, predominantly during the post-World War II time period. Numerous collections also document women in the workplace, both inside labor organizations and in a broader social context. A significant number of the library's oral histories relate to women's experiences at work, and the Reuther Library also serves as the official repository for the archival collections of the Society of Women Engineers.

A view of in Reuther's interior, from the atrium

=== Urban affairs ===
The Reuther Library collects material illustrating community life in metropolitan Detroit. These documents pertain to ethnic communities, art and cultural organizations, economics, race relations, activist groups, neighborhoods, and real estate development. The library contains the Jewish Community Archives, as well as the records of several community organizations, including those of Focus: HOPE, New Detroit, and the Detroit Commission on Community Relations, and many progressive organizations in the area. The library also houses papers of former Detroit politicians, including city councilman Mel Ravitz and mayors Jerome Cavanagh and Coleman Young. In addition, the archives contain the papers of notable 20th-century architect Minoru Yamasaki.

=== Wayne State University Archives ===
The Reuther Library houses the Wayne State University Archives, which date from the institution's founding as the Detroit Medical College in 1868. Collections relate to university development and initiatives, departmental activities, student life, and university publications such as The South End. University-affiliated organizations, including the Merrill-Palmer Institute, have placed their collections in the University Archives.

== Programs ==
The Reuther Library conducts public programming to inform the public about archives and their use. These include exhibits, tours, open houses, collection opening events, and more.

The Archives and Primary Resource Education Lab (APREL) at the Reuther Library promotes K-12 and Undergraduate use of archival materials in classrooms. The program offers instruction, embedded archivist services, curriculum development support and aims to study the impact of archives in education.

The Reuther Library is also home to Labor@Wayne, the Centers for Labor Studies, Wayne State University's Employment and Labor Relations Program, the Fraser Center for Workplace Issues, and the Michigan Labor History Society. Labor@Wayne and many of its associated arms have been overseen by its director, Elizabeth Faue, since its resuscitation in 2023.
