= Tendency (party politics) =

In socialist party politics, a tendency is a political faction, usually within a Marxist party or a Marxist faction of a wider party.

Examples include:

- Debs Tendency, a group formed around Eugene Debs in the Socialist Party USA
- International Marxist Tendency, the former name of the Revolutionary Communist International
- International Socialist Tendency, a coalition of Trotskyist organizations espousing the ideas of Tony Cliff
- Johnson–Forest Tendency, a Trotskyist group in the Workers Party (1940–1949) of the United States
- Marxist Tendency, a Trotskyist organization in post-Soviet Russia
- Militant tendency, a Trotskyist group in the UK Labour Party in the 1980s
- Militant Tendency (Ireland), a Trotskyist group that became the Irish Socialist Party
- Pathfinder tendency, a group of organizations that cooperate with the Socialist Workers Party of the United States

== See also ==
- Revolutionary Tendency (disambiguation)
