= Marion Junction =

Marion Junction may refer to:

- Marion Junction, Alabama, an unincorporated community
- Marion Junction (New Jersey), a railroad junction
- Marion Junction (South Dakota), a railroad junction
