= Detroit Summer =

Detroit Summer is a multi-racial and intergenerational collective based at The Boggs Center in Detroit, Michigan, with the goal to empower local youth to improve their communities. The program was founded in 1992 by James Boggs, Grace Lee Boggs, Shea Howell, and others. This also coincided with the founding of the Boggs Center.

== Background ==
In response to Detroit Mayor Coleman Young's plan for casinos to revitalize the city's declining economics, James Boggs and Grace Lee Boggs attempted to recreate the effects of the Mississippi Summer by recreating a similar program for youth in Detroit. In an interview, Grace Lee Boggs recounts being influenced by Martin Luther King, Jr., "He proposed that young people ‘in our dying cities’ needed programs that were designed to change themselves and their society." The goal of Detroit Summer was to develop a program where area youth could learn to become leaders to help shape the city's future. Boggs recounted, "our hope was that Detroit Summer would bring about a new vision and model of community activism- one that was particularly responsive to the new challenges posed by the conditions of life and struggle in the post-industrial city."

For Grace Lee Boggs, Detroit Summer was to be a space where local youth could learn through practice and through engaging with others from different generations of activists and educators. It was intended to be a small-scale, independent organization sustained through participant engagement.

=== Activities ===
Teens and volunteers involved in Detroit Summer participate in numerous activities from street cleaning, urban gardening, recycling waste, repurposing abandoned lots, repairing homes, education and outreach, and creating and coordinating public art in areas designated as "urban blight." Many also gain work experience working with local initiatives and community-based enterprises, such as the Back Alley Bikes shop. Participants gain manual skills, recycle post-consumer waste, and conduct outreach and education with the community.

Youth organizers with Detroit Summer also attend the Allied Media Conference, now held annually in Detroit, where they interact with community organizers, media activists, educators, and scholars. Many will organize panels, attend sessions and workshops, and create community-oriented media.

Public art projects engages school age children in efforts to beautify Detroit communities and imagine possible hopeful futures. These projects encourage youth to develop positive feelings towards their communities.

== Legacy ==
The success of Detroit Summer led to the formation of additional local youth groups including Back Alley Bikes, a youth bicycle collective, Detroit Future, and the Detroit Asian Youth Project. Alumni of Detroit Summer have gone on to take up leadership roles with Detroit Summer, the Boggs Center, and to affect change in education, media, art, policy, urban planning, and the larger local community in Detroit.

The James & Grace Lee Boggs School, a community-based charter school for K-8, grew out of Detroit Summer and its curriculum is informed by the empowering educational philosophies practiced by the founders and organizers of Detroit Summer.

According to professor of geography, Rachael Baker, "What is arguably [Grace Lee Boggs'] most lasting contribution to critical engagement with racialization and property relations is the work Grace carried out with her husband Jimmy in the Detroit Summer program; an initiative that gave Grace’s pedagogy life and am urban scale of influence that continues to live on in the urban fabric of civic activism in Detroit today."

=== Notable participants ===
- Julia Putnam, one of the first teens enrolled in Detroit Summer, would later go on to become the principal for the James and Grace Lee Boggs School.
- Jenny Lee, participated with Detroit Summer, and later joined the Detroit Digital Justice Coalition and became the Executive Director of Allied Media Projects, which hosts the Allied Media Conference annually.

=== Related organizations ===
- Detroit Future Schools
- Detroit City of Hope
- The James & Grace Lee Boggs School
- 5E Gallery
- Field Street Work Collective
- Freedom Growers
