= Philip P. Mason =

American archivist and author (1927–2021)

- Born: Philip P. Mason; April 27, 1927; Salem, Massachusetts, U.S
- Died: May 6, 2021 (aged 94)
- Education: Boston University; University of Michigan
- Occupations: administrator; archivist
- Employers: Society of American Archivists; Wayne State University
- Spouse: Marcia Mason
- Children: 5

Philip Parker Mason (1927 – 2021) was an American archivist and author, as well as the founding director of the Walter P. Reuther Library of Labor and Urban Affairs on the campus of Wayne State University in Detroit. Mason was professor emeritus at Wayne State, where he taught American History and Archival Administration for many years.

Mason received his B.A. from Boston University and a masters and Ph.D. from the University of Michigan.

He wrote or co-authored eleven books, and almost 100 articles. He was awarded the 2009 Historical Society of Michigan Lifetime Achievement Award, and an Award of Merit from the AASLH Leadership in History Awards for his works on the history of Michigan. He was President of the Society of American Archivists from 1970 to 1971 and president of the board of the Historical Society of Michigan in 1967.

He appeared as himself in the 2002 TV documentary Rumrunners, Moonshiners, & Bootleggers.

Mason died on May 6, 2021.

== Books ==
- A History of American Roads (Rand McNally, 1967)
- Call the Next Witness
- Heiress to a Proud Heritage
- Directory of Jewish Archival Institutions (Wayne State University Press, 1975)
- The Ambassador Bridge: A Monument to Progress (Wayne State University Press, 1987)
- Copper Country Journal: The Diary of Schoolmaster Henry Hobart, 1863-1864 (Wayne State University Press, 1991)
- Rumrunning and the Roaring Twenties (Wayne State University Press, 1995)
- Tracy W. McGregor: Humanitarian, Philanthropist, and Detroit Civic Leader (Wayne State University Press, 2008)

=== Co-authored ===
- Harper of Detroit: The Origin and Growth of a Great Metropolitan Hospital with Frank Bury Woodford (Wayne State University Press, 1964)
- Labor History Archives in the United States: A Guide for Researching and Teaching with Daniel J. Leab (Wayne State University Press, 1992)
- Prismatic of Detroit: Prismatic Club, 1866-1966 with Paul T. Rankin (Prismatic Club of Detroit, 1970)
