= Harrell Station Paleontological Site =

Paleontological Site in Dallas County, Alabama

Harrell Station Paleontological Site Harrell Station
- Fossil site
- Location: Dallas County, Alabama, United States
- Geology: Mooreville Chalk

The Harrell Station Paleontological Site, also called Harrell Station, is a site for paleontology located in the Black Belt region of Dallas County, Alabama. The University of Alabama owns a parcel spanning 132.5 acres containing numerous Mooreville Chalk gullies. The remainder of the site is privately owned.

== Geological setting ==
Harrell Station is located within the Black Belt region of Alabama, a region characterized by its exposures of Cretaceous period sedimentary rocks. The site is situated over Mooreville Chalk, a geological unit deposited during the Campanian stage of the late Cretaceous Period, approximately 82 million years ago. Although the formation is known as "Mooreville Chalk", it contains substantial quantities of clay and is better classified as a marl.

== History of research ==
Eugene Allen Smith noted the exposed gullies near Marion Junction in 1900. Documented fossil collection and research began in 1945, when Charles M. Barber from the Field Museum of Natural History explored chalk gullies near Eutaw, Alabama and found fossil bones. A crew from the Field Museum of Natural History visited Harrell Station the following fall. The 2nd expedition took place in May of 1946 and returned the first dinosaur remains from Alabama that could be identified to species-level.

Around 1990, Douglas Jones of the Alabama Museum of Natural History began raising funds and gathering donors for a 132.5 acre portion of the property. The purchase was made official on May 31, 1991. The University of Alabama still owns this portion of the property, although the rest of the site remains private property. The UA parcel is managed by the Curator of Paleontology of the University of Alabama Museums Research & Collections.

Although the site is not accessible to the general public, field trips are sometimes organized for members of the Alabama Paleontological Society and the Birmingham Paleontological Society.

== Fossils ==
Over 50 macrofossil species and over 100 microfossil species have been collected from Harrell Station. A literature survey by the University of Alabama's curator of Paleontology in April of 2023 found 32 fish species including 9 sharks, 9 turtles, 7 mosasaurs, 4 dinosaurs, 1 pterosaur, 1 crocodile, 2 ammonites, 1 worm, 5 bivalves, 1 bryozoan, 30 ostracods, 15 planktonic foraminifera, and 4 coccolithophores collected from the site. This survey is not comprehensive, and there are many specimens still awaiting verification.

=== Notable discoveries ===
- A fossilized dinosaur egg (believed to be an ornithomimid) was discovered by Prescott Atkinson in 1970 and brought to Auburn University, where it sat for nearly 30 years before being studied. The specimen was examined in 2000 by paleontologist James Lamb, where he discovered an embryonic bones. Synchrotron imaging in 2017 allowed researchers to digitally reconstruct an image of the skeleton. The specimen is thought to be the only collection of a dinosaur egg east of the Mississippi River (within the US). It is currently on display at the Auburn University Museum of Natural History.
- The holotype for the extinct angel shark species Cretasquatina americana was collected from Harrell Station. It is currently the only described species in the genus Cretasquatina.
- The holotype for the extinct otodontid shark species Cretalamna bryanti was collected from Harrell Station.

=== Species described from Harrell Station ===
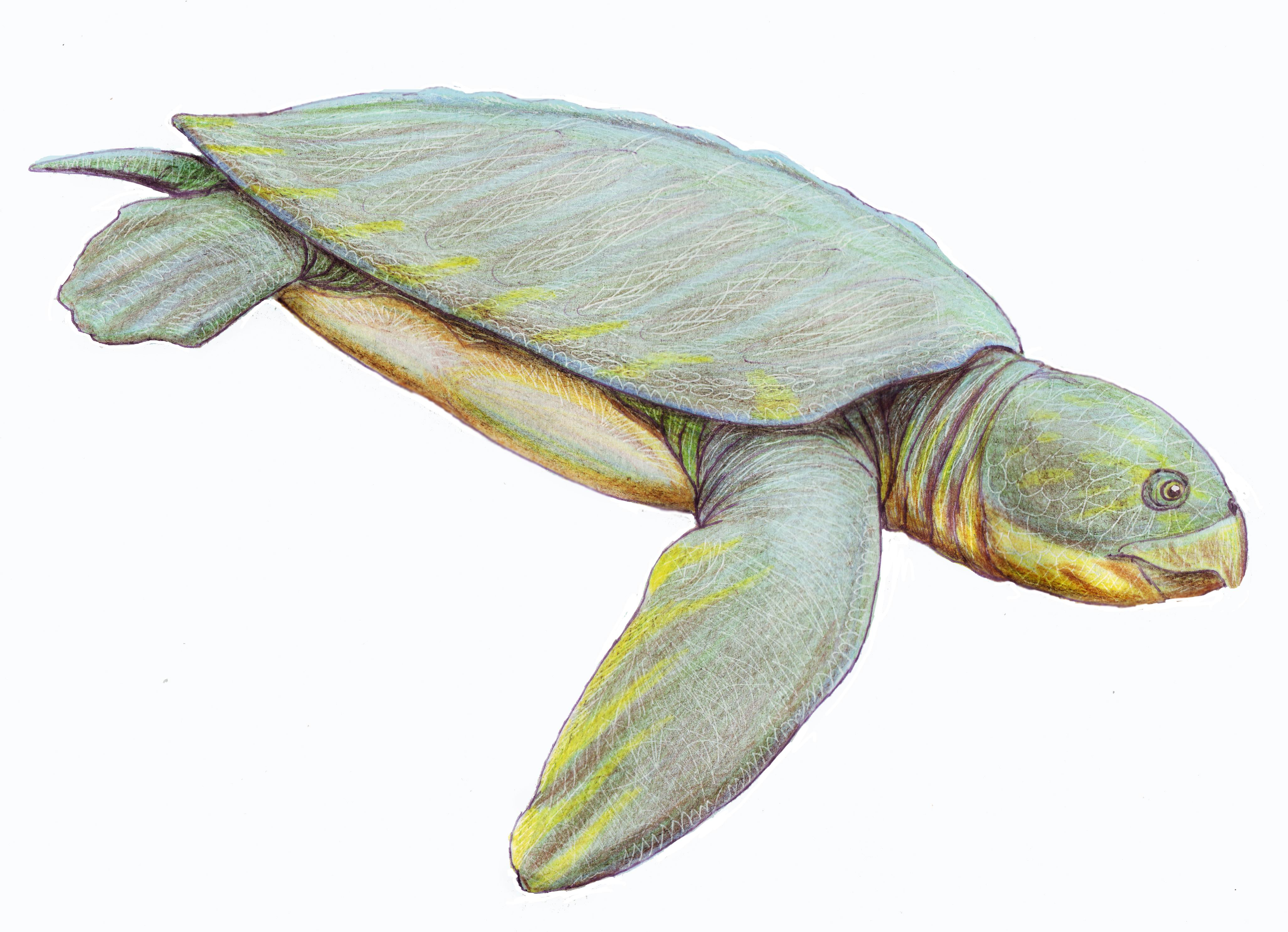
Protostega gigas, a Late Cretaceous sea turtle. Protostega dixie, described from Harrell Station fossils, is considered a junior synonym.

According to the University of Alabama Museums Research & Collections, fossils collected from Harrell Station have been used to describe 16 new vertebrate species, 13 of which are still considered valid.

- Lophorhothon atopus Langston, 1960
- Bananogmius crieleyi Applegate, 1970
- Edaphodon barbari Applegate, 1970
- Megalocoelacanthus dobiei Schwimmer et al., 1994
- Moorevillia hardi Applegate, 1970
- Tylosaurus zangerli Russell, 1970
- Cretalamna bryanti Ebersole & Ehret, 2018
- Cretasquatina americana Maisey et al., 2020
- Ctenochelys acris Zangerl, 1953
- Ctenochelys tenuitesta Zangerl, 1953
- Lophochelys venatrix Zangerl, 1953
- Podocnemis alabamae Zangerl, 1948 — junior synonym of Podocnemis barberi
- Prionochelys matutina Zangerl, 1953
- Protostega dixie Zangerl, 1953 — junior synonym of Protostega gigas
- Thinochelys lapisossea Zangerl, 1953
- Toxochelys moorevillensis Zangerl, 1953

== See also ==
- List of fossiliferous stratigraphic units in Alabama
- Paleontology in Alabama
