= Grace Lee Boggs =

American social activist, author (1915–2015)

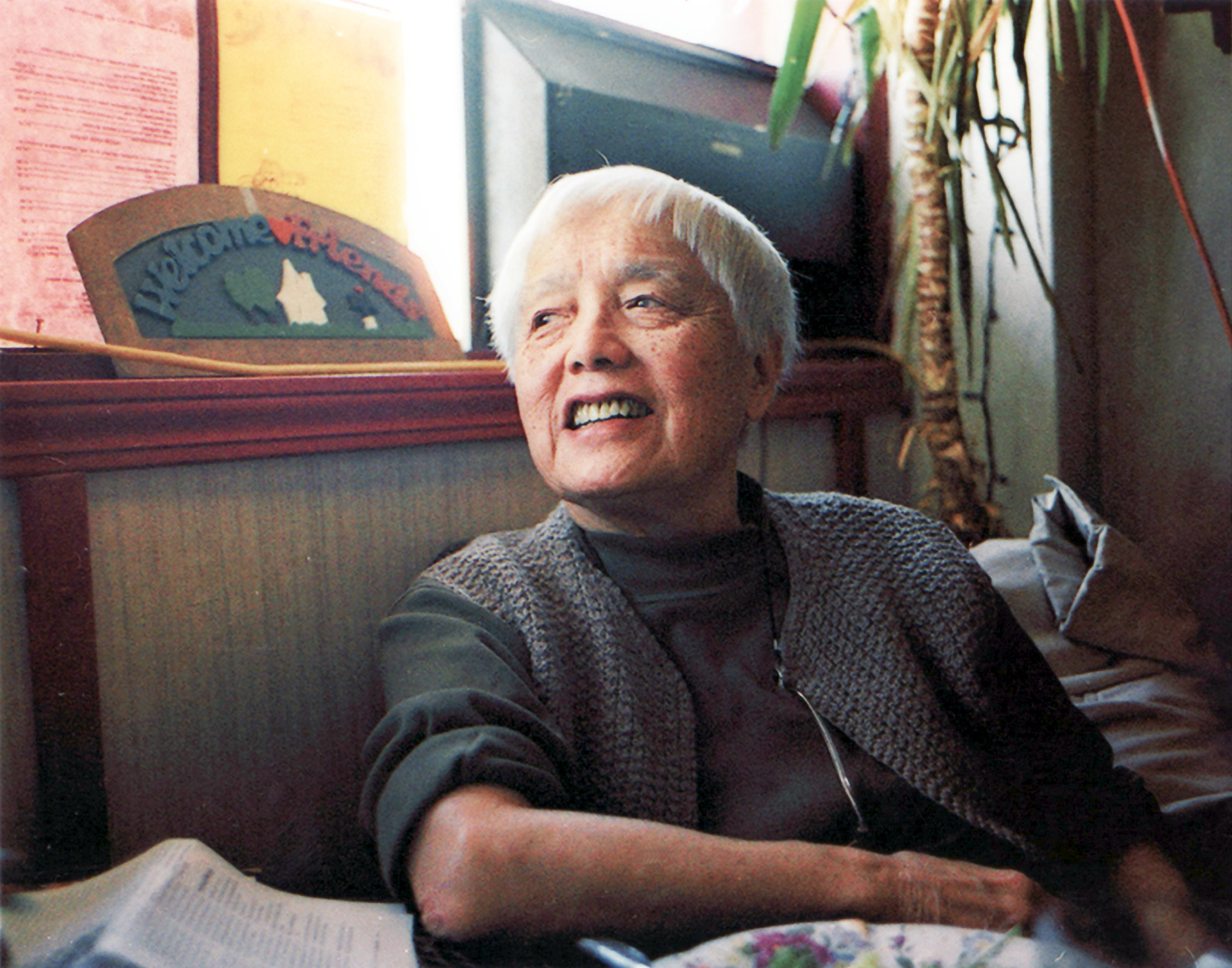
- Boggs at her home in Detroit in 2012
- Born: Grace Chin Lee; June 27, 1915; Providence, Rhode Island, U.S.
- Died: October 5, 2015 (aged 100); Detroit, Michigan, U.S.
- Other name: Ria Stone
- Education: Barnard College (BA); Bryn Mawr College (MA, PhD)
- Occupations: Writer; social activist; philosopher; feminist
- Political party: Workers Party (1941–1947); Socialist Workers Party (1947–1951); Correspondence Publishing Committee (1951– 1962)
- Movement: Johnson–Forest Tendency (1941–1951)
- Spouse: James Boggs (m. 1953; died 1993)

Chinese name
- Simplified Chinese: 陈玉平
- Traditional Chinese: 陳玉平
Transcriptions
Standard Mandarin
- Hanyu Pinyin: Chén Yù Píng
Yue: Cantonese
- Jyutping: Can4 Juk6 Ping4

Grace Lee Boggs (June 27, 1915 – October 5, 2015) was an American author, social activist, philosopher, and feminist. She is known for her years of political collaboration with C. L. R. James and Raya Dunayevskaya in the 1940s and 1950s. In the 1960s she and her husband, James Boggs, took their own political direction, turning their focus to civil rights and Black Liberation, Asian American, and other social justice movements. By 1998 she had written four books, including an autobiography. In 2011, still active at the age of 95, she wrote a fifth book, The Next American Revolution: Sustainable Activism for the Twenty-First Century, with Scott Kurashige, published by the University of California Press. She is regarded as a key figure in the Asian American, Black Power, and Civil Rights movements.

== Family and childhood ==
=== Early life ===
Boggs was born Grace Lee Chin on June 27, 1915, in Providence, Rhode Island, above her father's restaurant. Her Chinese given name was Yu Ping (玉平), meaning Jade Peace. She was the daughter of Chin Lee (1870–1965) and his second wife, Yin Lan Ng. Both her parents were originally from Taishan, Guangdong, in Qing dynasty China. Boggs's siblings include one sister, Katherine, and four brothers: Edward, Philip, Robert, and Harry. Chin Lee and Yin Lan Ng immigrated from China to the United States city of Seattle, Washington in 1911.

Early in her career, Boggs translated Karl Marx's works and was actively involved in several leftist organizations, including the Workers Party, the Socialist Workers Party, and the Trotskyist movement. She later collaborated with revolutionaries like C. L. R. James and Raya Dunayevskaya in intricate dialectical analyses, describing the Soviet Union in various terms such as a "degenerated workers' state" or a "state capitalist system".

=== Education ===
On a scholarship, Boggs went on to study at Barnard College of Columbia University, where she was influenced by Darwin's concept of evolution. She graduated in 1935 and then in 1940 received her Ph.D. in philosophy from Bryn Mawr College, where she studied with Paul Weiss and wrote her dissertation on George Herbert Mead.

=== Partnership with James Boggs ===
In 1953 Grace Lee Boggs married James Boggs, an African-American political activist and auto worker. They were married for 40 years until James Boggs' death in 1993. Together they published activist literature, books, and founded the National Organization for an American Revolution (NOAR).

Interviewed by Ibram X. Kendi about his joint biography of them, Stephen M. Ward states that together, Grace Lee Boggs and James Boggs "built a durable partnership that was at once marital, intellectual, and political. It was a genuine partnership of equals, remarkable not only for its unique pairing or for its longevity, but also for its capacity to continually generate theoretical reflection and modes of activist engagement."

== Activism ==
Facing significant barriers in the academic world in the 1940s, she took a low-paying job at the University of Chicago Philosophy Library. As a result of their activism on tenants' rights, she joined the revolutionary left Workers Party, known for its Third Camp position regarding the Soviet Union, which it saw as bureaucratic collectivist. At this point, she began the trajectory that she would follow for the rest of her life: a focus on struggles in the African-American community.

She met C.L.R. James during a speaking engagement in Chicago and moved to New York. She met many activists and cultural figures such as author Richard Wright and dancer Katharine Dunham. She also translated into English many of the essays in Karl Marx's Economic and Philosophical Manuscripts of 1844 for the first time. She soon joined the Johnson–Forest Tendency led by C.L.R. James, Raya Dunayevskaya, and Lee. They focused more centrally on marginalized groups such as women, people of color and youth as well as breaking with the notion of the vanguard party. She wrote for the Johnson–Forest Tendency under the party pseudonym Ria Stone. While originally operating as a tendency of the Workers Party, they briefly rejoined the Socialist Workers Party before leaving the Trotskyist left entirely, forming the Correspondence Publishing Committee in 1951. She married African-American auto worker and political activist James Boggs in 1953.

That same year, Grace and James Boggs moved to Detroit, where they continued to focus on Civil Rights and Black Power Movement activism. As scholar Brian Doucet articulates in his interview conducted with Boggs in 2014: "Living in Detroit influenced the Boggs' thinking on the role of automation, capital flight, and racism." Boggs helped found the Detroit Asian Political Alliance in 1970.

When C.L.R. James and Raya Dunayevskaya split in the mid-1950s into Correspondence Publishing Committee led by James and News and Letters led by Dunayevskaya, Grace and James supported Correspondence Publishing Committee that James tried to advise while in exile in Britain. In 1962, the Boggses broke with C.L.R. James and continued Correspondence Publishing Committee along with Lyman Paine, while James' supporters, such as Martin Glaberman, continued on as a new if short-lived organization, Facing Reality. The ideas that formed the basis for the 1962 split can be seen as reflected in James Boggs's book, The American Revolution: Pages from a Black Worker's Notebook. Grace Boggs unsuccessfully attempted to convince Malcolm X to run for the United States Senate in 1964. In these years, Boggs wrote a number of books, including Revolution and Evolution in the Twentieth Century with her husband and focused on community activism in Detroit where she became a widely known activist.

In 1979, Grace Lee Boggs and husband James Boggs contributed to the founding of National Organization for an American Revolution (NOAR).

In the introduction to an extensive interview, scholar Karín Aguilar-San Juan described one aspect of Boggs' activism: "Although she believes that racial and gender inequality will always demand struggle, Grace remains adamant that civil-rights-based activism will not lead to the farreaching changes in society that a higher state of human evolution requires." She goes on to explain that Boggs' "political path" has been "guided by her study of global and historical change, hand- in- hand with daily participation in and observation of the struggles of people at the grassroots level." In this interview Boggs discusses her relationship to her Asian American heritage, her experience with the Black Power movement, and many other topics.

She founded Detroit Summer, a multicultural intergenerational youth program, in 1992, and was the recipient of numerous awards. Additionally, the Boggs' home in Detroit also serves as headquarters for the Boggs Center to Nurture Community Leadership. The Boggs Center was founded in the early 1990s by friends of Grace Lee and James Boggs and continues to be a hub for community-based projects, grassroots organizing, and social activism both locally and nationally.

== Death ==
Grace Lee Boggs died on October 5, 2015, at 100 years old. An obituary in The New York Times reported that Boggs "waged a war of inspiration for civil rights, labor, feminism, the environment and other causes for seven decades with an unflagging faith that revolutionary justice was just around the corner."

President Barack Obama issued a statement on Boggs' death, praising her work for Detroit and for "her leadership in the civil rights movement, to her ideas that challenged us all to lead meaningful lives." He added that Boggs "understood the power of community organizing at its core".

== Legacy ==
=== Honors ===
- In 1999, Boggs was inducted into the National Women's Hall of Fame
- In 2013, The James and Grace Lee Boggs School was opened in Detroit, Michigan. The Boggs School teaches students from kindergarten to eighth grade, and among its core values are critical thinking, collaboration, and self-determination.
- In 2014, The Social Justice Hub at The New School's newly opened University Center was named the Baldwin Rivera Boggs Center after activists Boggs, James Baldwin, and Sylvia Rivera.
- In 2014, Boggs was inducted into the Michigan Women's Hall of Fame.

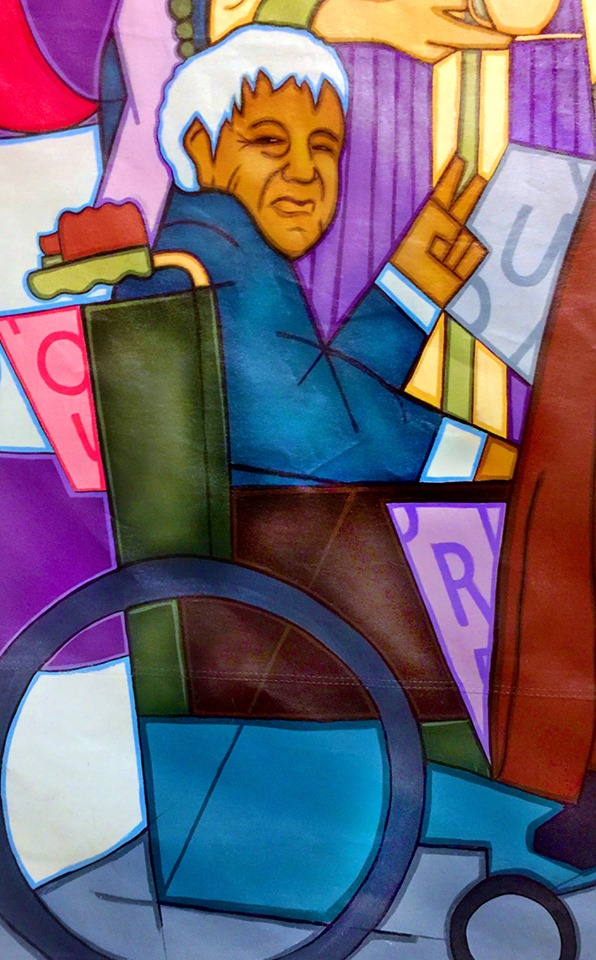
A portrait by Mike Alewitz of Grace Lee Boggs in his "We Follow The Path Less Traveled The City at The Crossroads of History" mural series.

- Boggs has received honorary doctorates from the University of Michigan, Wooster College, Kalamazoo College and Wayne State University.

=== In media ===
- American Revolutionary: The Evolution of Grace Lee Boggs, a 2013 biographical documentary on Lee Boggs life, activism and philosophy, directed by Grace Lee.
- Boggs was portrayed by Marion Kodama Yue in Barry (2016), a drama film about Barack Obama's years at Columbia University.
- In Love And Struggle: The Revolutionary Lives of James and Grace Lee Boggs by Stephen M. Ward (The University of North Carolina Press, 2016)
- We Are Here: 30 Inspiring Asian Americans and Pacific Islanders Who Have Shaped the United States (by Naomi Hirahana) (Philadelphia: Running Press Kids, 2022

== Bibliography ==
=== Books ===
- George Herbert Mead: Philosopher of the Social Individual (New York : King's Crown Press, 1945)
- The Invading Socialist Society (with C. L. R. James and Raya Dunayevskaya) (1947)
- State Capitalism and World Revolution (with C. L. R. James and Raya Dunayevskaya) (1950).
- Facing Reality (with C. L. R. James and Cornelius Castoriadis). (Detroit: Correspondence, 1958).
- Revolution and Evolution in the Twentieth Century (with James Boggs). (New York: Monthly Review Press, 1974).
- Women and the Movement to Build a New America (Detroit: National Organization for an American Revolution, 1977).
- Conversations in Maine: Exploring Our Nation's Future (with James Boggs, Freddy Paine, and Lyman Paine). (Boston: South End Press, 1978).
- Conditions of Peace: An Inquiry: Security, Democracy, Ecology, Economics, Community (Washington DC: Expro Press, 1991)

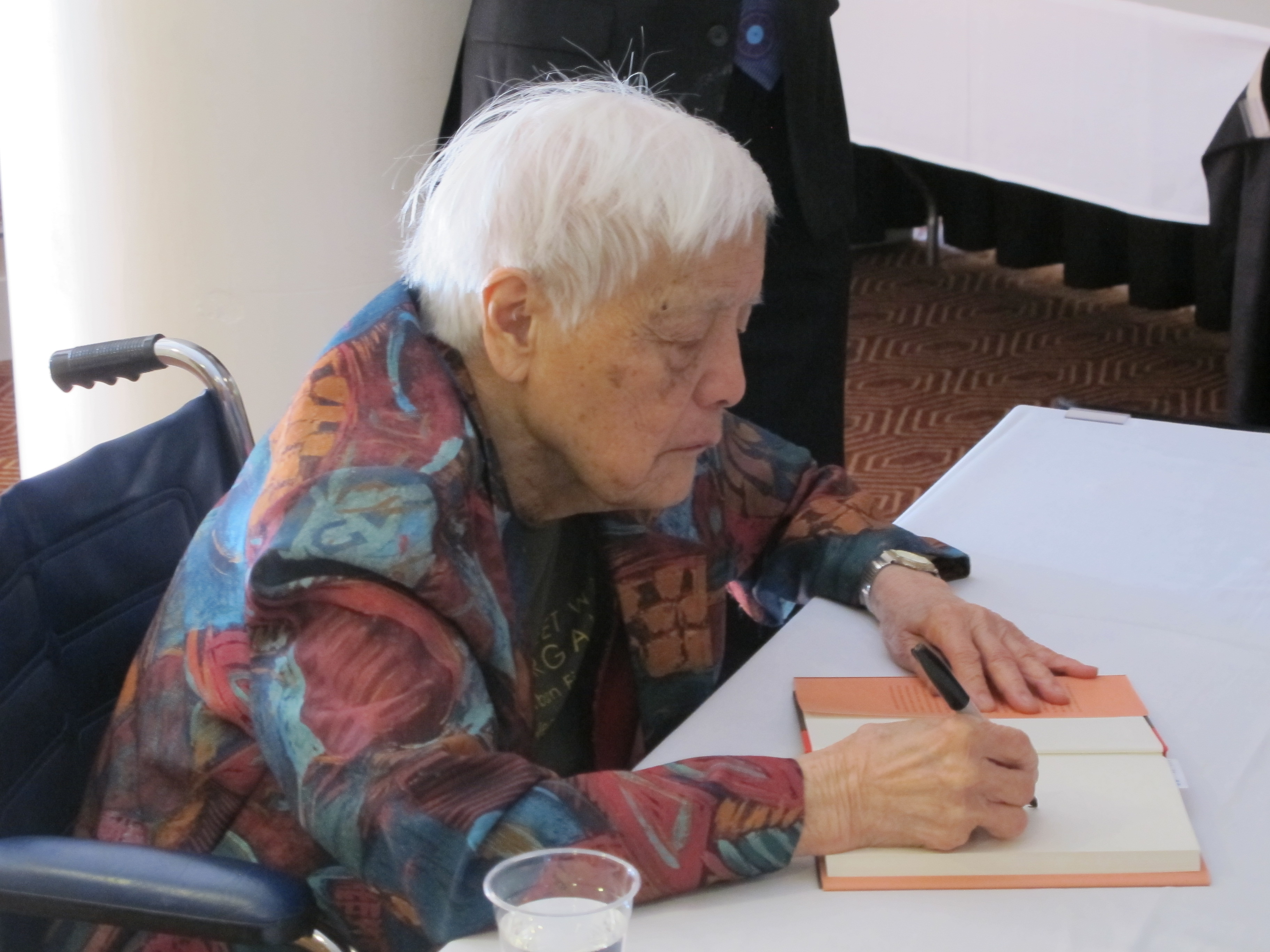
Grace Lee Boggs autographing 'Living for Change' at the Chinese Cultural Center

- Living for Change: An Autobiography (Minneapolis: University of Minnesota Press, 1998).
- The Next American Revolution: Sustainable Activism for the Twenty-First Century (with Scott Kurashige). (Los Angeles: University of California Press, 2011)

=== Interviews and appearances ===
- In 2005, Boggs spoke at the Conference on Activism, Ethnic Studies, Diaspora and Beyond held at Northwestern University. The speech was which was later reprinted in CR: New Centennial Review.
- In 2012, her speech with Angela Davis at the Pauley Ballroom in University of California titled" On Revolution: A Conversation Between Grace Lee Boggs and Angela Davis" was excerpted in the journal Race, Poverty, and the Environment.

== See also ==
- History of Chinese Americans in Metro Detroit
- Revolutionary Action Movement § Max Stanford
