= Marxism and Freedom =

1958 book by Raya Dunayevskaya

- First edition
- Author: Raya Dunayevskaya
- Language: English
- Publisher: Bookman Associates
- Publication date: 1958
- Publication place: United States
- Followed by: Philosophy and Revolution

Marxism and Freedom: from 1776 Until Today is a 1958 book by the philosopher and activist Raya Dunayevskaya, the first volume of her 'Trilogy of Revolution'. The book introduces her philosophy of Marxist humanism, centered on the idea that theory arises directly from lived struggle, in what she calls "the movement from practice". In her book, she argues that oppressed groups, including workers, women, Black Americans and youth, generate new forms of theory through their actions.

Dunayevskaya grounds this idea in historical examples like the West Virginia miners strike, the abolitionist movement and the Montgomery bus boycott, which she sees as part of a revolutionary American tradition influencing Marx. She also critiques the Soviet Union and China as "state-capitalist" systems that betrayed Marx's humanism.

== Core philosophy ==
The book marked the first expression in book form of Raya Dunayevskaya's Marxist humanism. A central theme is her assertion that the "movement from practice is itself a form of theory". This concept was developed by Dunayevskaya from a direct encounter with Hegel's dialectical philosophy and particularly his Absolutes, which she interpreted as posing a dual movement from practice to theory, and from theory to practice.

For Dunayevskaya, the agency of workers, Black Americans, women and youth in their fight for freedom was not merely social or political action, she held, but the source of new stages of cognition because in their very actions was embedded a theory of human liberation.

== Historical grounding ==
A key example of Dunayevskaya's view that theory emerges from practice is the West Virginia Miners Strike of 1949–1950. She noted that miners weren’t just asking for better wages, but rather they were raising philosophical questions like "What kind of labor should man do?" and "Why should there be such a gulf between thinking and doing?" She based the book's structure on her view that history and theory emanate from the movement from practice.

The book seeks to "establish the theory of Marxism on native grounds". The Montgomery bus boycott, the abolitionist movement, the American Civil War, and the fight for the eight-hour day by American workers were seen by her as revolutionary American struggles which provided fertile ground for the humanism of Karl Marx. Dunayevskaya analyzed the latter struggles as making "historic contributions" to Marx's thinking, especially in shaping his major theoretical work Capital.

She also pointed to postwar technological changes, such as the rise of automation in mining and auto work, as another turning point. The "continuous miner" (called a "mankiller" by workers) symbolized both capitalist progress and intensified alienation, being viewed by Dunayevskaya as a new stage in American worker revolt.

== Philosophical continuity ==
The 1958 edition of Marxism and Freedom contained the first published English translations of Karl Marx's Economic and Philosophic Manuscripts of 1844 and of Vladimir Lenin's notebooks on Hegel's Science of Logic. She felt a false division had been made between the "young Marx" of 1844, and the "mature Marx" of Capital. Rather, she saw Marx's complete body of work as a development of 1844, where he broke with bourgeois society and labeled his own thought "a thoroughgoing Naturalism, or Humanism."

== Critique of Soviet Marxism ==
Among those who argued for separating Marx into two distinct thinkers – one young and idealistic and the other mature and scientific – were Soviet theoreticians. Dunayevskaya believed the Communist state turned Marxism into its opposite – the totalitarian theory and practice of the Stalinist and post-Stalin USSR – and signaled a new stage of world "state-capitalism". Marxism and Freedom presented an analysis of the USSR's economy as state-capitalist – rather than socialist, bureaucratic collectivist, or a "degenerated workers' state" – based on Marx's economic categories and official Soviet statistics.

She pointed to the Uprising of 1953 in East Germany and the 1956 Hungarian Revolution as more than revolts against Communism, because they based themselves on Marx's Humanism. Later editions added critical analyses of Mao Zedong and his Cultural Revolution.

== Reception ==
Herbert Marcuse, a Marxist and member of the Frankfurt School, wrote the preface to the first edition. The British edition included a preface by Scottish socialist Harry McShane. A 2000 edition featured a new foreword by US Green Party activist and theorist Joel Kovel.

Council communist writer Paul Mattick strongly criticised the book, describing it as an "embarrassing, scatterbrained hodge-podge of philosophical, economic and political ideas that defy description and serious criticism." Mattick characterizes Dunayevskaya's method as a combination of "Hegelian mysticism, Marxian economics and Leninist demagogy," and particularly criticises Dunayevskaya's attempt to reconcile "Lenin’s authoritarianism with her own concept of the 'spontaneous self-organization of the proletariat.'"
