= Pontiac Silverdome =

Former stadium in Pontiac, Michigan, U.S.

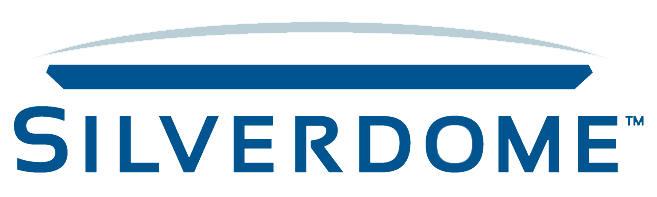

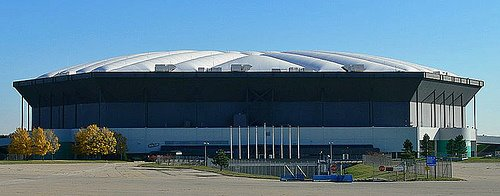
- Pontiac Silverdome in 2011
- Interactive map of Pontiac Silverdome
- Former names: Pontiac Metropolitan Stadium (1975–1976); Pontiac Silverdome (1976–2013) (Note: Under the ownership of Triple Investment Group, the stadium was solely known as "The Silverdome", though often was still referred to as "Pontiac Silverdome". At demolition, it was referred to as "Pontiac Silverdome".)
- Address: 1200 Featherstone Road
- Location: Pontiac, Michigan, US
- Coordinates: 42°38′45″N 83°15′18″W
- Owner: Andreas Apostolopoulos; Triple Investment Group
- Operator: Triple Sports & Entertainment
- Capacity: 82,000+ 80,311 (American football, soccer)
- Surface: AstroTurf (1975–2005); FieldTurf (2005–2006)
- Record attendance: 93,682; September 18, 1987 (Catholic Mass with Pope John Paul II)

Construction
- Groundbreaking: September 19, 1973
- Opened: August 23, 1975; April 17, 2010
- Closed: February 2006; January 2013
- Demolished: December 4, 2017 – March 2018
- Cost: US$55.7 million ($404 million in 2025 dollars)
- Architects: O'Dell, Hewlett and Luckenbach; C. Don Davidson
- Structural engineer: Geiger Berger Associates
- General contractor: Barton Malow

Tenants
- Detroit Lions (NFL) (1975–2001); Detroit Pistons (NBA) (1978–1988); Detroit Express (NASL) (1978–1980); Michigan Panthers (USFL) (1983–1984); Cherry Bowl (NCAA) (1984–1985); Motor City Bowl (NCAA) (1997–2001); Detroit Mechanix (AUDL) (2012)

Website
- silverdometickets.com at the Wayback Machine (archived February 2, 2011)

The Pontiac Silverdome was a multi-purpose stadium in Pontiac, Michigan, United States. It opened in 1975 and sat on 199 acres (51 ha) of land. When the stadium opened, it featured a fiberglass fabric roof coated in Teflon and held up by air pressure, the first use of the architectural technique in a major athletic facility. With a seating capacity of over 82,600, it was the largest National Football League (NFL) stadium until 2000.

It was primarily the home of the Detroit Lions of the NFL from 1975 to 2001 and was also home to the Detroit Pistons of the National Basketball Association (NBA) from 1978 to 1988. In addition, the Silverdome also served as the home venue for the Detroit Express of the North American Soccer League and the Michigan Panthers of the United States Football League, as well as two college bowl games: the Cherry Bowl and the Motor City Bowl. In 2012, the Silverdome served as the home venue of the Detroit Mechanix of the American Ultimate Disc League and hosted the league championship game that season.

The stadium was a regular concert venue and hosted a number of athletic and non-athletic events, including the 1979 NBA All-Star Game, Super Bowl XVI, WrestleMania III, early round games of the 1994 FIFA World Cup, and regional games in the NCAA Division I men's basketball tournament.

== Former uses ==
The Silverdome hosted the Detroit Lions of the NFL (1975–2001), the Detroit Pistons of the NBA (1978–1988), the Detroit Express (for both outdoor and indoor soccer) of the NASL (1978–1980), the Michigan Panthers of the USFL (1983–1984), college football's Cherry Bowl (1984–1985), the Motor City Bowl (1997–2001), the MHSAA football state finals (1976–2004) and four first-round games during soccer's 1994 FIFA World Cup.

For the World Cup matches, a natural grass surface capable of growing inside the dome was developed and installed by a team from Michigan State University. This grass surface was laid upon wooden pallets atop the artificial turf that was usually used. It was the first time that World Cup games were played indoors. The Silverdome also hosted the 1979 NBA All-Star Game, Super Bowl XVI on January 24, 1982, and the 1988 and 1991 NCAA Division I men's basketball tournament Midwest Regionals and NCAA Men's Division I Indoor Track and Field Championships in 1982 and 1983.

On March 29, 1987, the World Wrestling Federation's WrestleMania III reportedly established the record for attendance of 93,173, the largest recorded attendance for a live indoor sporting event in North America. The record stood until February 14, 2010, when the 2010 NBA All-Star Game broke the indoor sporting event record with an attendance of 108,713 at Cowboys Stadium. The Silverdome also hosted an AMA Supercross Championship, an American motorcycling round, from 1976 to 2005.

In 2012, the Silverdome became the home stadium of the city's professional Ultimate Frisbee team, the Detroit Mechanix, of the American Ultimate Disc League. That year, the Silverdome hosted the AUDL championship game, as on August 11, the Philadelphia Spinners defeated the Indianapolis AlleyCats 29–22.

After the roof had been collapsed and the stadium abandoned, Red Bull produced a video of BMX rider Tyler Fernengel riding inside the Silverdome in 2015. Some notable tricks in the video were Fernengel's barspin to double peg to 180° spin on one of the handrails inside the stadium and an impressive "truckdriver" (handlebars spinning 360° while the bike frame spins 360°) out of the luxury boxes onto a ramp that led down to the field. That same year, a drag racing event at the former parking lot marked the beginning of Woodward Dream Cruise.

== History ==
=== Conception and development ===
The idea of a major sports complex was part of a dream of C. Don Davidson, a Pontiac native and star high school athlete. Davidson, upon graduating from Pontiac Central High School in 1947 and completing active duty with the U.S. Marine Corps, attended North Carolina State University on a football scholarship. After earning a master's degree in urban planning and architecture, Davidson began his career as an architect and was recognized for several government and city projects throughout the south including Florida's Jacksonville International Airport. He returned to Pontiac in 1965 and was shocked to see the deterioration of the city and its lack of a future plan. Davidson embarked upon what would eventually become an obsession for him to see his beloved city succeed. In 1965–66, he was hired as a professor of architecture and urban planning at the University of Detroit under the direction of Bruno Leon.

As part of an ongoing, comprehensive study by his architecture class on urban renewal for the city of Pontiac, Davidson met with various city and state authorities including William Clay Ford, owner of the Detroit Lions, to discuss the possibility of a new stadium, made it a college class project to find a suitable site for a new stadium and even started his own weekly newspaper known as The Pontiac Times, to help promote his vision. After much controversy and sparring with Detroit city officials, Pontiac was chosen over several other sites including the Michigan Fairgrounds, Walled Lake and the Detroit Riverfront as the best place for construction of what would become known as the Pontiac Silverdome. Already having a stadium concept as part of his master plan for the city, Davidson was interviewed and ultimately hired as chief project designer for the stadium project by the architectural firm of O'Dell, Hewlett and Luckenbach. Initial designs included a dual stadium complex for both football and baseball (potentially housing the Detroit Tigers) that was later scrapped due to high costs. Davidson was pleased to see a part of his vision for the city of Pontiac accomplished in the building of the 80,000-seat sports complex. Completed in 1975 as the Pontiac Metropolitan Stadium, at a cost of $55.7 million, the Silverdome seated 80,311. It contained 102 luxury suites and 7,384 club seats. It sometimes incorporated the arrowhead emblem from its now-defunct namesake General Motors division into its own logo.

=== Original silver-like roof ===
The original silver-like roof was built of Teflon-coated fiberglass panels, supported by air pressure inside the stadium. Although the roof has always been white in color as viewed with the naked eye, the stadium obtained the name "Silverdome" (which it would officially take on in 1977) due to a silver-like reflection caused by the Sun, mainly noticed from the sky. (Initially, however, the stadium also went by its shortened nickname of PonMet, but that nickname was disliked by Pontiac city commissioners.) The roof was replaced by a new canvas fabric, reinforced by steel girders after a strong snowstorm on March 4, 1985, caused structural damage to the old roof. Because of the damage, the Detroit Pistons played the remainder of the 1984–85 season at the Joe Louis Arena. The accident, and the delay in repairs, partially prompted the Pistons moving three seasons later 4 miles (6 km) north to their new, privately owned, 20,000-seat sports arena, The Palace of Auburn Hills.

The 1985 repairs were necessitated by a collapse of the original 1975 roof around noon EST on March 4, 1985. Heavy, wet snow accumulated on the southwest corner of the dome and depressed the fabric panels low enough so that the fabric came in contact with a steel lighting catwalk that was positioned just below the inner lip of the roof's ring beam. The hole caused a loss of air pressure and the Dome deflated slowly – there were no injuries. The shift from a "dome" to "bowl" caused all the heavy, wet snow to slide down into the bowl and rupture more roof panels, collapse some precast risers in the SW upper deck, and dislodge more plastic seats "... than a Rolling Stones concert" according to Bob Haney, the Dome's Operations Manager. Crews from Owens-Corning Fiberglas, the dome's original roof installer, were on site by 1:30 pm on March 4. Repair operations began immediately but were interrupted for over a week due to high winds. During the high winds event nearly all of the remaining panels in the deflated roof, 100 in all, were badly damaged. The decision was made to replace the entire roof and incorporate some improvements to prevent a similar event from occurring in the future. Repair cost of the roof was just under $8 million.

The repairs were completed and the dome re-inflated at noon on May 28, 1985. A thunderstorm passed through the Pontiac area the morning the Dome was to be re-inflated and a partial inflation, or "puff", was performed so that the scheduled inflation could occur in the presence of the many city and area politicians as well as a number of corporate executives. The original-style, Teflon-coated fiberglass material was used to make the repairs – not canvas as described in the article. There were several snow-melting and waterproofing improvements that kept the dome inflated until January 2, 2013 – almost 28 years.

=== Notable audience attendance numbers ===
The largest crowd to gather at the Silverdome was on September 18, 1987, for Mass with Pope John Paul II, with a reported attendance of 93,682 — just shading the reported record of 93,173 set at the Silverdome on March 29, 1987, for WrestleMania III. Another notable audience attendance record had earlier been broken on April 30, 1977, when the English rock band Led Zeppelin played in front of 76,229 fans at the Silverdome. This was, at the time, a new world record attendance for a solo indoor attraction, beating the 75,962 that the Who attracted there on December 6, 1975. The Detroit Pistons also set numerous NBA attendance records during their time at the Silverdome; Regular Season, 61,983 vs. Boston, January 29, 1988; Playoffs, 41,732, vs. L.A. Lakers, June 16, 1988.

=== 1994 FIFA World Cup ===
The Silverdome was a venue for the 1994 FIFA World Cup. In an exhibition game between Germany and England in June 1993, English coach Graham Taylor criticized the indoor venue's lack of weather as removing an unpredictability factor from soccer. The lack of air conditioning contributed to extreme heat and humidity, an advantage to the Germans playing for Italian clubs. The 62,126 attendance was the highest in any US soccer match since 1984.

On June 18, 1994, the United States tied 1–1 with Switzerland in the first World Cup game to be played indoors. Swiss coach Roy Hodgson later admitted that his team had not prepared for the extreme temperature and humidity.

=== Marching band activities and events ===
The Silverdome was also the home to many marching band activities and events, including the Michigan Competing Band Association State Marching Band Championships until 2005, the Bands of America Regional championships from 2003 to 2005, and the Bands of America Grand National Championships in 1987 and 1988. Following its reopening, the Silverdome was host to the 2010, 2011 and 2012 Bands of America Pontiac Regional Championship.

=== Usage after Lions' move to Ford Field ===
The Lions moved from the Silverdome to Ford Field after the end of their 2001 season. Despite being the Lions' home for 27 seasons, the day of the last home game, January 6, 2002, was marked by a noticeable absence of nostalgia among the fans as well as the players. In particular, long-time Lions' defensive end Robert Porcher singled out the stadium's artificial turf as the worst part about playing at the Silverdome, echoing other players present that day.

The upper concourse was used for inline skating and provided skaters with a 25-foot wide track measuring 0.4 miles on the inner edge and 0.5 miles on the outer edge.

When the World Hockey Association (WHA) tried to re-introduce itself, the new WHA Detroit team was slated to play its home games at the Silverdome. Plans were also mooted for a Windsor-based Canadian Football League team which could have used the dome for possible playoff games, but that team also did not materialize.

After the Lions relocated, activity in the Silverdome dropped drastically; however, it still staged some events. Annually, Jehovah's Witnesses used the Silverdome from the late 1970s to 2004. Due to talk of renovation in 2004, the Witnesses opted to travel to The Dow Event Center in Saginaw, and the SeaGate Convention Centre in Toledo, Ohio for their District Conventions. Between 2003 and 2006, a three-screen drive-in theater operated in the parking lot; this theater reopened in 2010 before closing again on July 13, 2011.

The Silverdome hosted Monster Jam on January 7, 2006, and was used as a practice facility for the AFC champion Pittsburgh Steelers for Super Bowl XL, with the NFL adding FieldTurf, which was later donated to a local high school.

=== Sale ===
After the Lions' departure, the city of Pontiac began to experience several years of serious financial problems. Due to the continued high maintenance costs of the structure, it made several unsuccessful attempts to sell the stadium. In early 2008, United Assurance Company Ltd. made the highest purchase offer to date, with a bid of $18 million to convert the Silverdome into a Hollywood-style entertainment complex, following an earlier bid of $12 million by an attorney. However, the city announced in October 2009 that the property would go to auction with no minimum bid, and that zoning regulations would be relaxed for any buyer in order to spark development. The city engaged the firm of Williams & Williams to conduct the auction in November 2009.

After reading about the auction in a newspaper, Greek-born Canadian real estate developer Andreas Apostolopoulos, CEO of Toronto-based Triple Properties Inc., submitted a winning bid of US$550,000. Real estate fees of 6% raised the price to US$583,000. The sale of the Silverdome, completed in 1975 at a cost of $55.7 million (approx. $225 million in 2012 dollars) and sold in 2009 for $583,000, was viewed by many as a symbol of the collapse of real estate prices in the Detroit metropolitan area though many local leaders and residents claimed the sale was brought about due to the incompetence of city management and their not having a vision or future plans for the stadium and surrounding area.

=== Reopening (2010–2013) ===
In the March 11, 2010, edition of the Detroit Free Press, Apostolopoulos vowed "to revive the stadium as a big-event venue by investing millions of dollars".

The Silverdome re-opened on April 17, 2010, with a monster truck event.

A.C. Milan and Panathinaikos F.C. played an exhibition game on August 6, 2010. On January 29, 2011, professional boxer Timothy Bradley defended his WBO light welterweight title in a unification fight against WBC champion Devon Alexander. The fight aired live on HBO World Championship Boxing, with an attendance of about 7,000.

The owners indicated that they were pursuing a possible expansion team for Major League Soccer, and contemplated renovating the Silverdome for this purpose. Ultimately, the lack of events coming into the stadium, combined with the 2013 roof collapse, put any further development plans on indefinite hold.

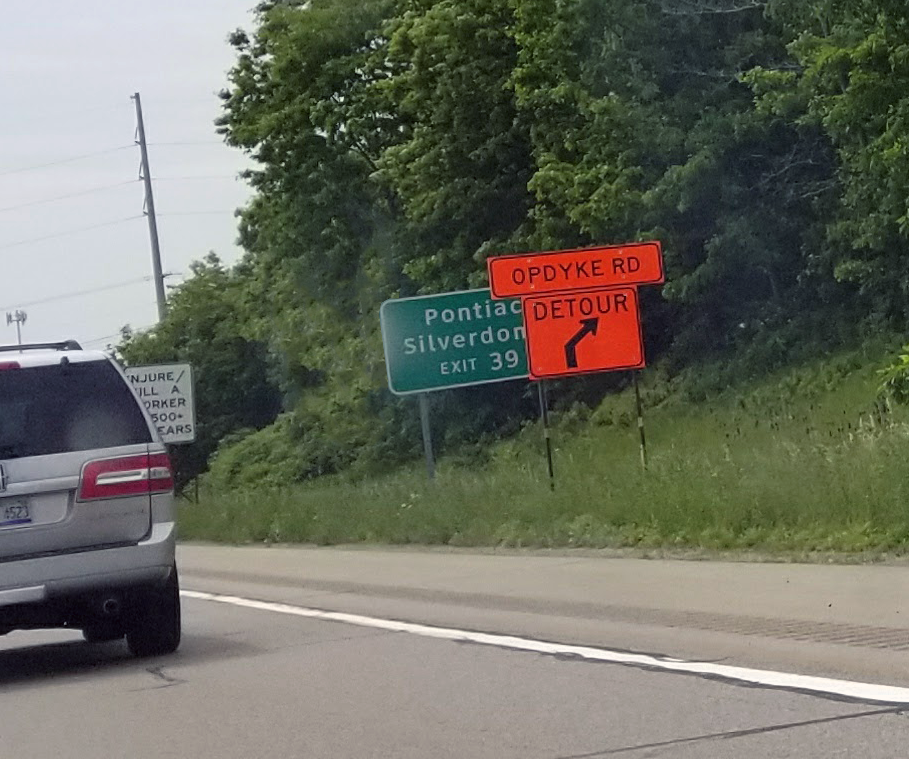
Exit sign for Pontiac Silverdome on M-59 before it was removed in 2017.

=== Auctioning of contents and demolition ===
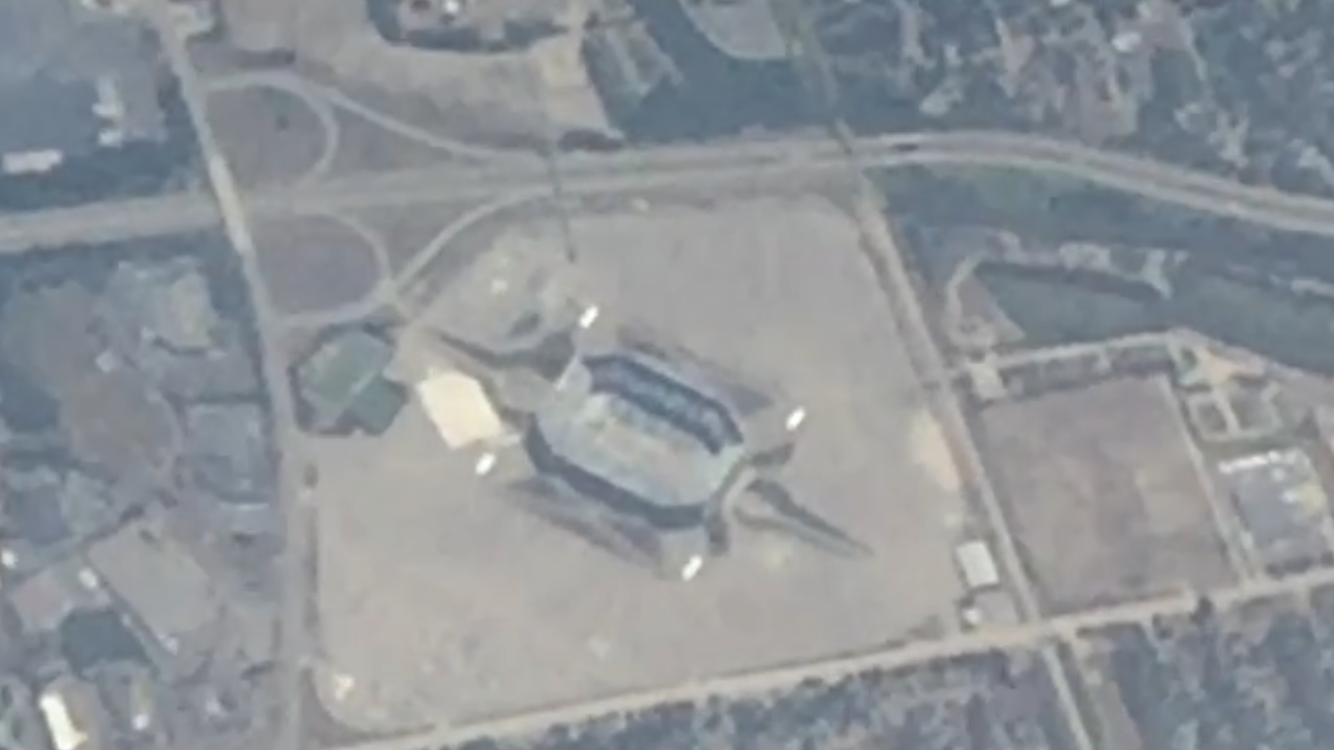
The Silverdome as seen from a passenger flight in 2016

In March 2014, the owners announced that they would be auctioning off the contents of the facility, including seats and fixtures.

In December 2014, Cleveland-based photographer Johnny Joo captured the Silverdome in a state of abandonment, showing destruction caused by the 2013 roof collapse.

Afterwards, in October 2015, it was announced that the Silverdome would be demolished in 2016, and the area would be part of an Oakland County mixed-use development. Demolition was then scheduled for December 3, 2017. In June 2016, fire caused by arson destroyed the former press box. Around the same time, the parking lot began being used as storage for hundreds of Volkswagen diesel cars as a result of Volkswagen's 2015 emissions scandal. The dome owner and the city were in conflict over the condition of the dome and the cars in the lot.

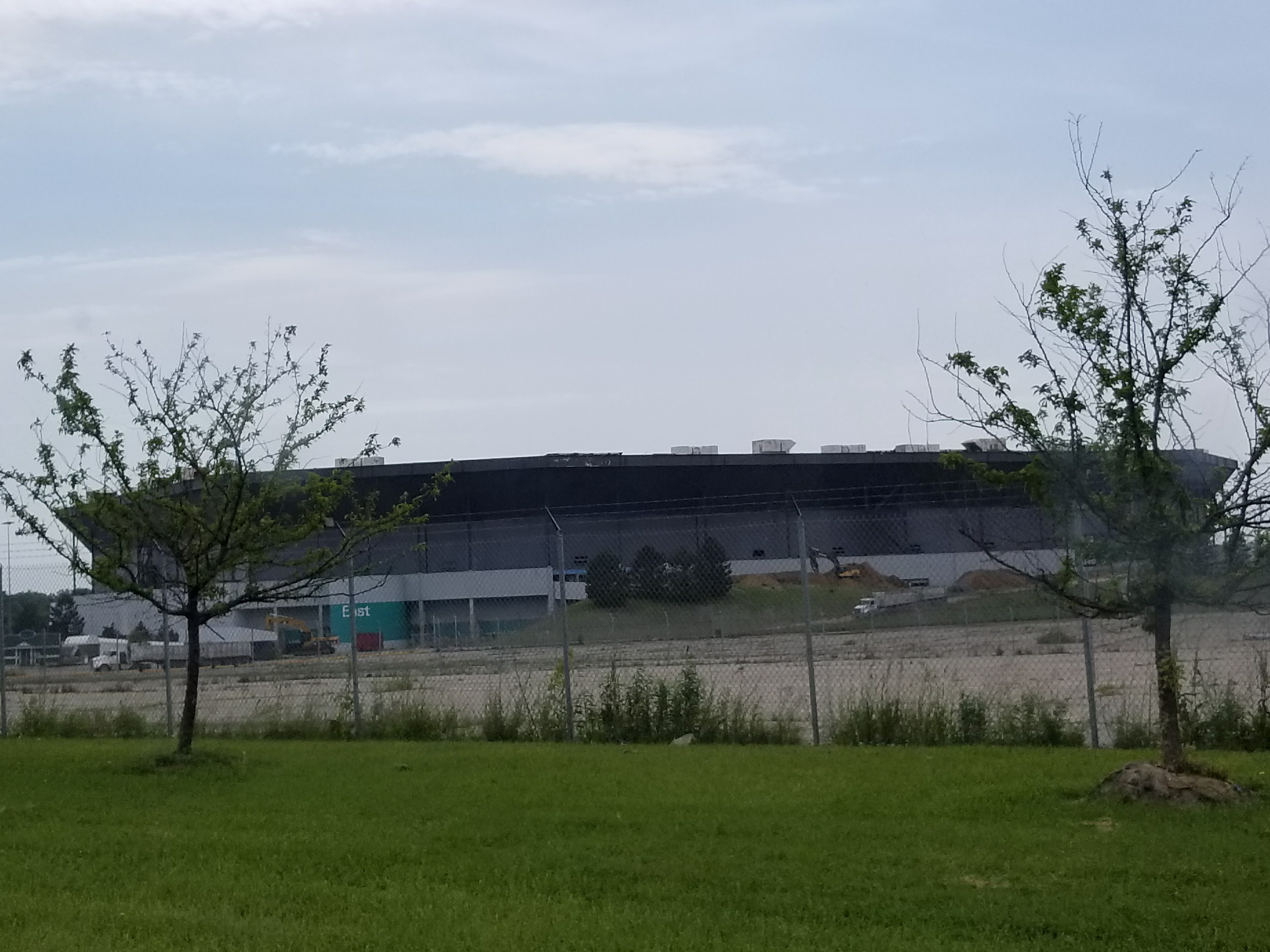
Pontiac Silverdome in June 2017. Six months before demolition began.

In 2017, the Silverdome was condemned and cleared for demolition. Workers had been on the site for the past few months before main power feeds were disconnected preparing the Silverdome for demolition, including completing environmental remediation, universal waste removal and tearing out transite asbestos panels that were used in a majority of the suites around the perimeter of the dome; though not without a few local trespasser visits to explore the place leading up to the demolition. On September 18 and 19, 2017, four power feeds were disconnected, officially starting the final preparation process for demolition. The firm contracted to handle the demolition, the Detroit-based Adamo Group, also imploded the Georgia Dome in Atlanta on November 20 before moving on to the Silverdome. The demolition of the Silverdome was to commence on December 3, 2017, with a partial implosion of the upper deck, followed by an excavation of the building from the inside out.

Due to a wiring issue, eight of the explosive charges failed to detonate, preventing the stadium from imploding as planned. A second attempt was successful the next day. While Adamo could not pinpoint the exact cause of the issues, they did note that trespassers had been seen on the property a couple of days prior to the first attempt. It was noted that on the second attempt, Adamo doubled the amount of explosives used from 300 to 600 lb (136 to 272 kg) of TNT. By the end of March 2018, the last free standing wall of the Silverdome was destroyed, leaving a 50 foot (15 m) deep hole where the stadium once stood. 55,000 cubic yards (42,050 m^{3}) of crushed concrete remained on site to be used as landfill material. Demolition officials stated that final filling and grading operations of the former Silverdome site were expected to be completed by the end of November 2018.

=== Site re-development ===
In September 2019, the City of Pontiac announced that Amazon was going to develop the Silverdome site into both a distribution facility and delivery center. The delivery center opened in September 2020, while the distribution center opened in 2021. The project cost an estimated $250 million.

== Significant events ==
=== NFL ===
- August 23, 1975 – Detroit Lions' first game in Silverdome, a preseason contest against the Kansas City Chiefs.
- October 6, 1975 – Lions' first regular season game, a 36–10 defeat by the Dallas Cowboys on ABC Monday Night Football.
- October 12, 1975 – Lions' first regular season Silverdome victory, a 27–7 defeat of the Chicago Bears.
- November 27, 1975 – Lions' first Thanksgiving Day game in the Silverdome, a 20–0 loss to the Los Angeles Rams.
- January 24, 1982 – Super Bowl XVI.
- January 5, 1992 – Lions' first home playoff game at the Silverdome – a 38–6 victory over the Dallas Cowboys. This stood as the Lions' most recent playoff victory for 32 years, until their 24–23 victory over the Los Angeles Rams on January 14, 2024, at Ford Field.
- November 23, 2000 – Tom Brady made his NFL debut in a 34–9 Lions victory at the Silverdome. Brady completed 1 of 3 passes for 6 yards.
- January 6, 2002 – The final Lions game played at the stadium, a 15–10 victory over the Dallas Cowboys.

=== Basketball ===
- October 13, 1978 – Detroit Pistons' first home game in Silverdome
- February 4, 1979 – NBA All-Star Game
- January 29, 1988 – Detroit Pistons single game attendance record (61,983 vs Boston Celtics)
- 1988 – NCAA Division I men's basketball tournament Midwest Regional – Sweet Sixteen Games and Finals
- June 12, 14 and 16, 1988 – NBA Finals games 3 through 5.
- 1991 – NCAA Division I men's basketball tournament Midwest Regional – Sweet Sixteen Games and Finals

=== Soccer ===
Date	Winning Team	Result	Losing Team	Tournament	Spectators
February 2, 1992	United States	2–1	CIS	Friendly	35,248
June 19, 1993	Germany	2–1	England	1993 U.S. Cup Final	62,126
June 18, 1994	United States	1–1	Switzerland	1994 FIFA World Cup Group A	73,425
June 22, 1994	Switzerland	4–1	Romania	1994 FIFA World Cup Group A	61,428
June 24, 1994	Sweden	3–1	Russia	1994 FIFA World Cup Group B	71,528
June 28, 1994	Brazil	1–1	Sweden	1994 FIFA World Cup Group B	77,217
August 6, 2010	(Italy) Milan	0–0 (5–3 p)	(Greece) Panathinaikos	Friendly	30,514

=== Boxing & Pro Wrestling ===
- March 29, 1987 – WrestleMania III (reported Pontiac Silverdome record attendance of 93,173).
- January 29, 2011 – (HBO Championship Boxing Match) "The Superfight".

=== Concerts ===
Date	Artist(s)	Supporting act(s)	Tour	Attendance	Revenue	Note(s)	Reference(s)
December 6, 1975	The Who	Toots & the Maytals	The Who Tour 1975	75,962	—	The live versions of "Join Together", "Road Runner", and "My Generation Blues" were recorded for The Kids Are Alright soundtrack but were omitted from the first CD release of the soundtrack, but were included in the reissued edition.	
December 31, 1975	Elvis Presley	—	—	62,500	$816,000	This was Presley's first New Year's Eve show.	
May 8, 1976	Aerosmith	Ted Nugent; Outlaws; Foghat	Rocks Tour	76,900	—		
July 11, 1976	Elton John	—	Louder Than Concorde Tour	—	—		
July 25, 1976	Jethro Tull	Rick Derringer; Robin Trower	Too Old To Rock 'N' Roll Tour	—	—		
April 30, 1977	Led Zeppelin	—	1977 North American Tour	76,229	$792,361.50	Set attendance record for a solo indoor attraction.	
March 5, 1978	Kenny Rogers; Dottie West	Oak Ridge Boys	—	60,000+	—	This performance was billed as the "World's Largest Indoor Country Music Show".	
July 13, 1978	Kiss	Cheap Trick; New England	Dynasty Tour	—	—		
July 28, 1979	Bee Gees	Sweet Inspirations	Spirits Having Flown Tour	36,270 / 36,270	$453,375		
December 7, 1979	The Who	Blackfoot	The Who Tour 1979	—	—		
November 30, 1981	The Rolling Stones	Iggy Pop; Santana	American Tour 1981	152,696 / 152,696	$2,290,000		
December 1, 1981	The Rolling Stones	Iggy Pop; Santana	American Tour 1981	152,696 / 152,696	$2,290,000		
September 30, 1982	The Who	Eddie Money; The Clash	The Who Tour 1982	75,000 / 75,000	$1,119,000		
August 17, 1984	The Jacksons	—	Victory Tour	143,700	$4,350,030		
August 18, 1984	The Jacksons	—	Victory Tour	143,700	$4,350,030		
August 19, 1984	The Jacksons	—	Victory Tour	143,700	$4,350,030		
September 4, 1985	Bruce Springsteen and the E Street Band	—	Born in the U.S.A. Tour	69,844 / 69,844	$1,222,270		
April 30, 1987	U2	Lone Justice	The Joshua Tree Tour	51,718 / 51,718	$853,347		
August 7, 1987	Madonna	Level 42; Bhundu Boys; Hue and Cry	Who's That Girl World Tour	41,017 / 44,556	$881,866		
June 17, 1988	Van Halen; Scorpions	Dokken; Metallica; Kingdom Come	Monsters of Rock Tour 1988	—	—		
June 18, 1988	Van Halen; Scorpions	Dokken; Metallica; Kingdom Come	Monsters of Rock Tour 1988	—	—		
November 10, 1987	Pink Floyd	–	A Momentary Lapse of Reason tour	46,192 / 46,192	$923,840		
July 25, 1989	The Who	—	The Who Tour 1989	46,000 / 46,000	$1,058,000		
December 9, 1989	The Rolling Stones	Living Colour	Steel Wheels Tour	100,234 / 100,234	$2,956,834		
December 10, 1989	The Rolling Stones	Living Colour	Steel Wheels Tour	100,234 / 100,234	$2,956,834		
May 24, 1992	Genesis	—	We Can't Dance Tour	—	—		
July 21, 1992	Metallica; Guns N' Roses	Faith No More	Guns N' Roses/Metallica Stadium Tour	47,540 / 47,540	$1,378,660	After Guns N' Roses performed their song "You Could Be Mine", Axl Rose vomited onstage and left soon afterwards, but returned to the stage and apologized to the audience for the poor performance, so the band did the song again.	
September 9, 1992	U2	Primus; The Disposable Heroes of Hiphoprisy	Zoo TV Tour	36,740 / 40,680	$1,102,200	This show was on the Outside Broadcast leg of the tour.	
June 4, 1993	Paul McCartney	—	The New World Tour	49,378 / 49,378	$1,291,778		
July 14, 1994	Pink Floyd	—	The Division Bell Tour	111,355 / 111,355	$3,772,950	The band performed their classic album The Dark Side of the Moon in its entirety for the first time since 1975.	
July 15, 1994	Pink Floyd	—	The Division Bell Tour	111,355 / 111,355	$3,772,950	The band performed their classic album The Dark Side of the Moon in its entirety for the first time since 1975.	
August 18, 1994	Billy Joel; Elton John	—	Face to Face 1994	54,125 / 54,125	$2,444,334		
December 1, 1994	The Rolling Stones	Spin Doctors	Voodoo Lounge Tour	38,274 / 38,274	$1,815,325		
October 31, 1997	U2	Smash Mouth	Popmart Tour	35,463 / 40,000	$1,781,621	This show took place on Larry Mullen's 36th birthday	
December 2, 1997	The Rolling Stones	Third Eye Blind	Bridges to Babylon Tour	51,466/ 51,466		Eric Zylema fell to his death from the second level while dancing on the railing with a blood alcohol level of .21	
July 31, 1999	NSYNC	Jordan Knight; Sugarhill Gang; 3rd Storee	NSYNC in Concert	48,163 / 55,626	$1,528,735		
December 31, 1999	Metallica	Ted Nugent; Kid Rock; Sevendust	M2K Mini Tour	54,707 / 54,707	$3,049,117	This was a New Year's Eve concert. At the show, Metallica broadcast the Times Square Ball Drop, ushering in the year 2000, and played the classic Kiss track "Detroit Rock City" alongside the opening acts.	
July 18, 2000	NSYNC	P!nk	No Strings Attached Tour	48,708 / 48,708	$2,395,413	This concert was filmed for their concert movie "*NSYNC: Bigger Than Live".	
February 15, 2001	Backstreet Boys	Destiny's Child	Black & Blue Tour	—	—		
July 4, 2003	Metallica	Limp Bizkit; Linkin Park; Deftones; Mudvayne	Summer Sanitarium Tour	—	—		

=== Other events ===
- February 22, 1983—United States Hot Rod Association held its first monster truck car crush, made by Bob Chandler and Bigfoot II, inside a stadium.
- February 27, 1983 — The American Speed Association (ASA) held an asphalt stock car race inside the dome. The ASA started their National tour's season in the dome and the race was won by Butch Miller.
- September 18, 1987 — Pope John Paul II celebrated Mass (Silverdome attendance record of 93,682).
- October 27, 2004 Rally for the George W. Bush 2004 re-election campaign
- April 17, 2010 — "Domination In The Dome" (Monster Trucks) Grand re-opening of the Silverdome.

== Notes ==
Events and tenants
Preceded by Tiger Stadium	Home of Detroit Lions; 1975–2001	Succeeded by Ford Field
Preceded by Omni Coliseum	Host of the NBA All-Star Game; 1979	Succeeded by Capital Centre
Preceded by Louisiana Superdome	Host of Super Bowl XVI; 1982	Succeeded by Rose Bowl
Preceded by Cobo Arena	Home of the Detroit Pistons; 1978–1988	Succeeded by The Palace of Auburn Hills
Preceded by first venue	Home of the Cherry Bowl; 1984–1985	Succeeded by last venue
Preceded by Hoosier Dome	Host of Bands of America; Grand National Championship; 1987–1988	Succeeded by RCA Dome
Preceded by first stadium	Host of Motor City Bowl; 1997–2001	Succeeded by Ford Field
Preceded by Nassau Coliseum; Rosemont Horizon; L.A. Sports Arena	Host of WrestleMania III; 1987	Succeeded by Trump Plaza
