= Frater Albertus =

German-American esotericist (1911–1984)

Albert Richard Riedel (5 May 1911 – 14 July 1984), known under the pseudonym Frater Albertus Spagyricus, was a German-American esotericist. Riedel was born May 5, 1911, in Dresden, later immigrating to the United States. He wrote several books and other written works and was an influential figure in the world of occult alchemists. His work The Alchemist's Handbook was published in 1960, the same year he founded the Paracelsus Research Society in Salt Lake City, which later evolved into the Paracelsus College. The group ran several periodicals and bulletins, including Essentia, Parachemy, and the Alchemical Bulletin Codex. Riedel was an influence on the English occultist Israel Regardie. Ridel died on July 14, 1984. After his death, the college ceased operations in the United States.

== Written works ==
- Drei Novellen 1932
- Dachstubenverse eines Ausgewanderten (Attic Poems of an Emigrant)
- The Alchemist's Handbook 1960
- From One to Ten 1966
- Praxis Spagyrica Philosophia (Leipzig, 1711) (1966 PRS limited ed. 500 copies) 1998 Weiser with From One to Ten
- The Seven Rays of the QBL (1st. Ed. 1981.) 1985 Weiser
- Praktische Alchemie im Zwanzigsten Jahrhundert 1970 PRS (German)
- Men and Cycles of the Universe 1970
- The Alchemist of the Rocky Mountains 1976 PRS (limited edition 500 copies)
- Gently I Answered and Said 1978 PRS (limited edition 500 copies)
- Book on Antimony (only mention)

== Associated works ==
- Parachemy 1973–1979
- Parachemica 1976 - 1980 P.R.S. (Aust.)
- Essentia 1980 - 1984
- AMO 1983 Paracelsus College; First English translation from German by Robert Firmage; introduction by Frater Albertus
- Golden Manuscripts 1973-74 Para Publishers
