= Correspondence Publishing Committee =

U.S. political party

- Founded: 1951
- Preceded by: Johnson–Forest Tendency
- Succeeded by: News and Letters Committees; 1955–Present; Facing Reality; 1962-1970
- Ideology: Marxism; Anti-Stalinism
- Political position: Far-left

Correspondence Publishing Committee was a radical left organization led by C. L. R. James and Martin Glaberman that existed in the United States from approximately 1951 until it split in 1962.

== History ==
The Correspondence Publishing Committee has its origins in the Johnson–Forest Tendency led by C. L. R. James and Raya Dunayevskaya. Its origins are as a Trotskyist organization but it developed a number of theories including that the Soviet Union was a State Capitalist society, an emphasis on Hegelian theory as a way of understanding the world and a rejection of the Leninist vanguard party. It also sought to focus more energy on the political issues affecting women, youth, African Americans and rank and file workers.

It also had an emphasis on analysing popular culture such as movies and books that was unusual for the era. After spending time as a faction inside both the Workers Party and the Socialist Workers Party, the Johnson–Forest Tendency broke with the Trotskyist left. By early 1951, it had renamed itself Correspondence Publishing Committee. It first published a newspaper, also known as Correspondence, in November 1951 and analysed a wildcat miners' strike in West Virginia in the first issue. The newspapers' cartoons have drawn critical acclaim.

It was forced to deal with the deportation of one of its main leaders, C. L. R. James, to Britain in 1953 that had a negative impact on the group. Although C. L. R. James continued to advise the group on a very regular basis from Britain, tensions in the group continued and a significant number led by Raya Dunayevskaya split from Correspondence in 1955 to form News and Letters and promote Marxist-Humanist ideas. They publish a newspaper by the same name that remains in print today. Whether a majority or a minority split from Correspondence in 1955 remains in dispute. Historian Kent Worcester claims that Raya Dunayevskaya had a majority of the members in 1955 but Martin Glaberman, writing in New Politics has claimed the opposite. He has also challenged other aspects of Worcester's book in a review that appeared in Against the Current magazine.

After the split, James Boggs was named the new editor of Correspondence newspaper. It issued a number of interesting pamphlets including Martin Glaberman's Union Committeemen and Wildcat Strikes in 1955 and C. L. R. James' Every Cook Can Govern: A Study of Democracy in Ancient Greece. The latter favourably analyzed democracy in the Greek city states, despite the oppression that women and slaves experienced in ancient Greek society.

However, Correspondence will perhaps be best remembered for the book about the 1956 Hungarian workers' revolt, Facing Reality, by C. L. R. James, Grace Lee Boggs and Pierre Chaulieu, a pseudonym for Cornelius Castoriadis. However, the group split again in 1962 when Grace Lee Boggs, James Boggs, Freddy Paine and Lyman Paine split from C. L. R. James. They continued to publish Correspondence for a couple of years but increasingly reflected Third Worldist, somewhat Maoist politics. Martin Glaberman and others who remained loyal to C. L. R. James started a new organization known as Facing Reality that continued to promote the same politics as Correspondence until its dissolution in 1970.

== Facing Reality ==
The most important contribution of this group was the publication of the book, Facing Reality. It analyzed the implications of the October 1956 revolt in Hungary against Stalinist rule. The nature of the contribution by Cornelius Castoriadis is complex because he apparently did not have an opportunity to examine the manuscript before it went to press. The book argued that the example of Hungary demonstrated that modern society was shifting towards confrontation between workers' councils and bureaucratic institutions. Therefore, organizations such as Correspondence were needed. It also included a defense of the role of revolutionary newspapers, such as the one published by Correspondence. There was also analysis of the radical potential of anti-colonial movements such as the Gold Coast nationalist movement that had emerged in what is now Ghana. Attention was paid to the role of Kwame Nkrumah. The book was sharply criticized by Raya Dunayevskaya.

== Sources ==
- Worcester, Kent (1996). C.L.R. James: A Political Biography. SUNY Press. ISBN 978-0-7914-2752-1.
- Rosengarten, Frank (2007). Urbane Revolutionary: C.L.R. James and the Struggle for a New Society. Univ. Press of Mississippi. ISBN 978-1-60473-306-8.
