= O'Dell, Hewlett & Luckenbach =

American architectural firm

O'Dell, Hewlett and Luckenbach was a Metro Detroit-based architectural firm. Their firm specialized in schools and civic buildings. Some of their notable buildings include the Pontiac Silverdome, Ford Auditorium, and Oakland County Courthouse.

== History ==
The firm was founded by H. Augustus O'Dell (1876–1965), Thomas H. Hewlett, and Owen A. Luckenbach in 1938. Almon J. Durkee and Owen Luckenbach's son, Carl Luckenbach (1935–2022), began their own firm in 1962. Their firm merged with the larger firm in 1969, with Carl Luckenbach and Almon Durkee assuming leadership positions. By 1980, the firm was called Luckenbach-Ziegelman, as Robert Ziegelman was brought on as a partner.

== List of buildings ==
- Ford Auditorium, 1955
- Pontiac Silverdome, 1975
- Oakland County Courthouse, 1962
- Royal Oak High School, 1957
- Oak Park High School, 1953
- Millennium Middle School (former South Lyon High School), 1968
- Oakland University, Hannah Hall of Science, 1962
- Meadow Brook Amphitheatre, 1964
- Oakland University, Wilson Hall, 1964
- Oakland University, Dodge Hall of Engineering, 1968
- Oakland University, Varner Hall, 1971
- Bicentennial Tower, 4 E Alexandrine, Detroit, 1976
- Pontiac Central High School, 1974
- Flat Rock City Hall, c. 1977
- Wayne State University, Shiffman Medical Library, 1970
- Wayne State University, Law Building, 1966
- Western Michigan University, Sprau Tower/Brown Hall/Shaw Theater complex, 1967
- Western Michigan University, Physical Sciences Buildings (Rood and Everett Halls), 1971
