= Revolutionary Tendency =

Revolutionary Tendency may refer to:

- Revolutionary Tendency (SWP), a faction within the US Socialist Workers Party in the early 1960s
- Revolutionary Tendency, a faction within the US-based International Socialists which split in the 1970s to form the Revolutionary Socialist League (US)
- Tendencia Revolucionaria, a group of left-wing Peronist organizations in Argentina in the 1970s
