= Johnson–Forest Tendency =

Radical left tendency in the United States

- Founder: C. L. R. James – "J. R. Johnson"; Raya Dunayevskaya – "Freddie Forest"; Grace Lee Boggs – "Ria Stone"
- Founded: 1945; 81 years ago
- Dissolved: 1962; 64 years ago
- Succeeded by: Correspondence Publishing Committee (1951–1962); News and Letters Committees (1955–present); Facing Reality (1962–1970)
- Ideology: Marxism; Trotskyism (early); Anti-Stalinism
- Political position: Far-left

The Johnson–Forest Tendency (JFT), whose supporters are called the Johnsonites, was a radical left tendency in the United States associated with the Marxist humanist theorists C. L. R. James and Raya Dunayevskaya, who used the pseudonyms "J. R. Johnson" and "Freddie Forest" respectively. They were joined by author/activist Grace Lee Boggs (pseudonym: "Ria Stone"), who was considered the third founder.

== History ==
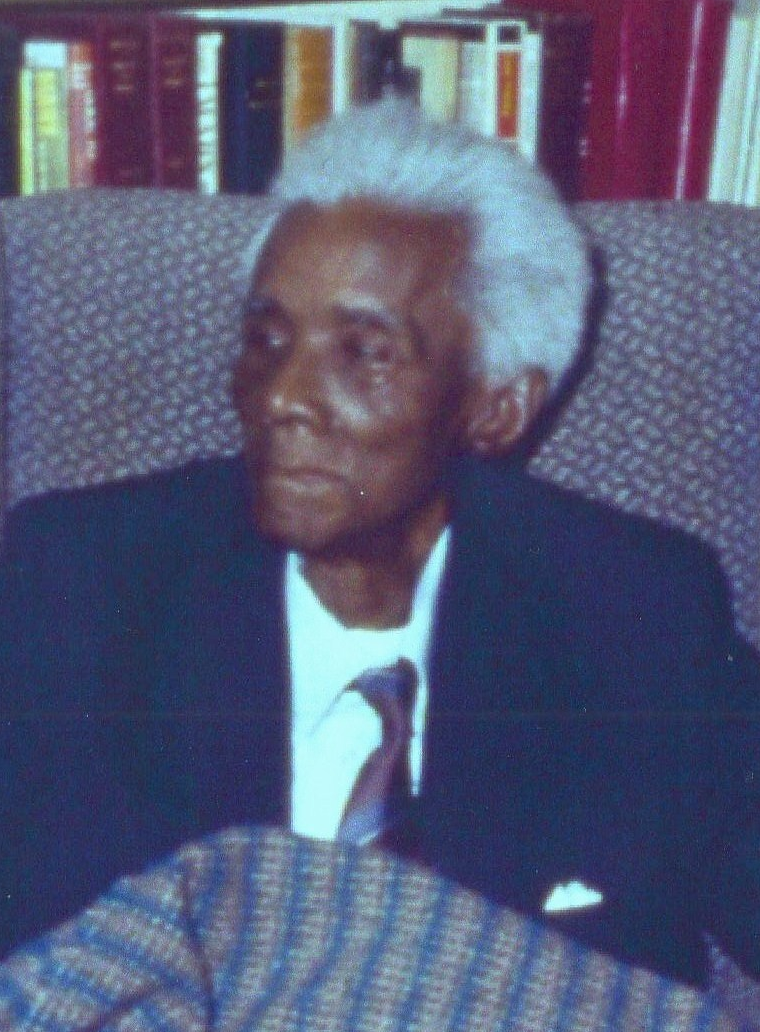
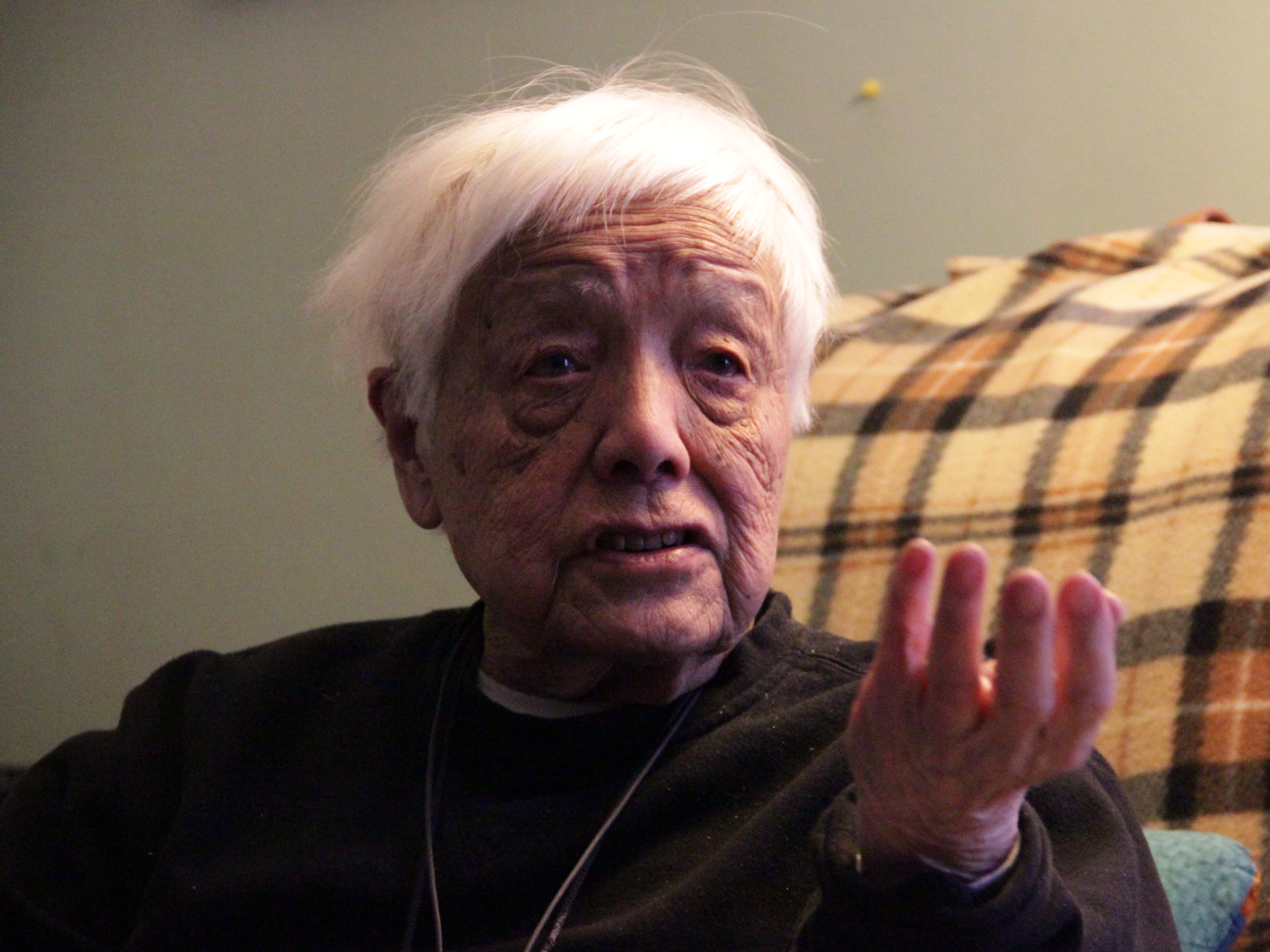
C. L. R. James founded the Tendency with Raya Dunayevskaya (not pictured). Grace Lee Boggs led the final split of the Johnsonites in 1962.

Much of the story of the Johnson–Forest Tendency relates to disputes between various factions of the Trotskyist parties in the US. James and Dunayevskaya first met in the Socialist Workers Party. From 1939–1940, there was a bitter fight amongst the members of the Socialist Workers Party, and in 1940, James, Dunayevskaya, and Max Shachtman, among others, split to form the Workers Party. James and Dunayevskaya set up a study group within the Workers Party to work on the idea of state capitalism, and were soon joined by Grace Lee Boggs.

While this new group rapidly cohered around politics which were very similar to those of the Socialist Workers Party, there were certain differences which eventually led to the formation of the Johnson–Forest Tendency. The majority of the Workers Party members believed, as did Shachtman, that the class nature of the Soviet Union was such that it should be designated a bureaucratic collectivist society. The minority opinion, held by James, Dunayevskaya, and Lee, held that it was state capitalist. Further, James was unhappy with the WP's lack of interest in Black activism. This resulted in their secession from the Workers Party.

Their disgruntlement with the Shachtmanite majority within the Workers Party led Johnson–Forest in 1947 to rejoin the Socialist Workers Party. It was during this time that the Johnson–Forest Tendency reached the conclusion that, as there was no true socialist society existing anywhere in the world, a return to the fundamentals of Marxism was in order. Their emphasis on Hegel's philosophy as being the foundation of Marxism was largely due to Dunayevskaya, who was deeply immersed in both Marx's and Lenin's writings.

Johnson–Forest remained in the Socialist Workers Party until 1950, exiting the party once again with a book co-authored by James and Dunayevskaya, State Capitalism and World Revolution. In the three years Johnson–Forest remained in the Socialist Workers Party, James also participated in party discussions on the American "Negro question" (as it was then called), arguing for support for separate struggles of blacks as having the potential to ignite the entire U.S. political situation. His hypothesis prefigured the organized civil rights movement of the 1950s and 1960s.

Finally leaving the Socialist Workers Party, Johnson–Forest founded their own organization for the first time called Correspondence which was renamed the Correspondence Publishing Committee the next year. However, tensions that had surfaced earlier presaged a split, which took place in 1955. Through his theoretical and political work of the late 1940s, James had concluded that a vanguard party was no longer necessary, because its teachings had been absorbed in the masses. In 1956, James would see the Hungarian Revolution of 1956 as confirmation of this.

Dunayevskaya had agreed that the Leninist vanguard party was outmoded, but, in contrast to James, felt the need for some kind of revolutionary organization. In 1953, James was deported from the U.S. to Britain for the lack of a visa, and the polemic continued. The split was completed in 1955, when Dunayevskaya and her faction founded the group News and Letters Committees. Grace Lee remained with the Johnsonites who founded Facing Reality, as well as a newsletter based in Detroit of the same name. When Lee moved away from the group in the early 1960s, the continuity of the Johnsonite tradition was maintained by Martin Glaberman until Glaberman's death in 2001.

== Publications ==
- The Invading Socialist Society a pamphlet published by the JFT in 1947.
- Trotskyism in the United States, 1940-1947 BALANCE SHEET The Workers Party and the Johnson Forest Tendency a pamphlet published by the JFT in 1947.

== See also ==
- Autonomist Marxism
- Chaulieu–Montal Tendency (a tendency inspired by Johnson–Forest)
- Marxist humanism
