= James Boggs (activist) =

American activist (1919–1993)

- James Boggs and his wife Grace Lee Boggs
- Born: May 27, 1919; Marion Junction, Alabama, U.S.
- Died: July 22, 1993 (aged 74); Detroit, Michigan, United States
- Occupations: Auto worker, political activist
- Political party: Correspondence Publishing Committee
- Spouses: Annie McKinley (m. 1938; divorced); Grace Chin Lee (m. 1953)

James Boggs (May 28, 1919 – July 22, 1993) was an African-American Marxist political activist, auto worker, and author. He was married to philosopher-activist Grace Lee Boggs. James Boggs was best known for authoring The American Revolution: Pages from a Negro Worker's Notebook in 1963.

== Biography ==
Boggs was born in 1919 in Marion Junction, Alabama, and moved to Detroit in 1938. He was an auto worker at Chrysler from 1940 until 1968.

James Boggs married Grace Lee Boggs in 1953 and they remained married until his death in 1993. They worked with organizations such as Save Our Sons and Daughters, We the People Reclaim Our Streets, and Detroiters Uniting.

Boggs was active in the revolutionary left organization the Correspondence Publishing Committee from around the time it left the Trotskyist movement in the early 1950s. The group was advised by C. L. R. James, who was at that time exiled in Britain. In 1955, James Boggs became the editor of their bi-monthly publication, called Correspondence. When Correspondence Publishing Committee had a split in 1955, led by Raya Dunayevskaya, and lost nearly half its membership, James and Grace Lee Boggs remained loyal to the Correspondence Publishing Committee. However, in 1962, they led a split themselves, taking control over Correspondence Publishing Committee and breaking with C. L. R. James. Afterwards, Boggs continued publication of Correspondence independently for a few years.

In 1963 he published his book The American Revolution: Pages from a Negro Worker's Notebook. He has also written Racism and the Class Struggle as well as co-authored Revolution and Evolution in the Twentieth Century with Grace Lee Boggs.

In later years, he played an influential role in the radical wing of the civil rights movement and was connected with many important civil rights activists of the day including Malcolm X, Ossie Davis, and others.

In 1979 James Boggs and Grace Lee Boggs contributed to the founding of National Organization for an American Revolution (NOAR).

== Works ==
- The American Revolution: Pages from a Negro Worker's Notebook (New York: Monthly Review Press, 1963).
- Book Manifesto for a Black Revolutionary Party (Philadelphia: Pacesetters Publishing House, 1969).
- Racism and the Class Struggle: Further Pages from a Black Worker's Notebook (New York: Monthly Review Press, 1970).
- Lenin Today; Eight Essays on the Hundredth Anniversary of Lenin's Birth (with Paul Sweezy and Harry Magdoff) (New York: Monthly Review Press, 1970).
- The Awesome Responsibilities of Revolutionary Leadership (with Grace Lee Boggs) (Detroit: Committee for Political Development, 1970).
- But What About the Workers? (with James Hocker) (Detroit: Advocators, 1973).
- Revolution and Evolution in the Twentieth Century (with Grace Lee Boggs) (New York: Monthly Review Press, 1974).
- Issues in Race and Ethnic relations: Theory, Research, and Action (with Jack Rothman) (Itasca, Illinois: F.E. Peacock Publishers, 1977).
- Conversations in Maine: Exploring Our Nation's Future (with Grace Lee Boggs, Freddy Paine, and Lyman Paine) (Boston: South End Press, 1978).
- Towards a New Concept of Citizenship (Detroit: National Organization for an American Revolution, 1979).
- Liberation or Revolution? (Detroit: National Organization for an American Revolution, 1980).
- These Are the Times That Try Our Souls: The Questions We Have Yet to Ask Ourselves (with Grace Lee Boggs and James Hocker) (Detroit: National Organization for an American Revolution, 1981).
- Historical Development of Our Social Forces (Detroit: National Organization for an American Revolution, 1982).
- Our American Reality (Detroit: National Organization for an American Revolution, 1982).
- The Urgent Plea: A Call for Black Leadership (Philadelphia: National Organization for an American Revolution, 1985).
- What Can We Be That Our Children See? (Detroit: New Life Publishers, 1994).

== See also ==
- History of African Americans in Detroit
