= Marion Junction, Alabama =

Unincorporated community in Alabama, United States

- Unincorporated community
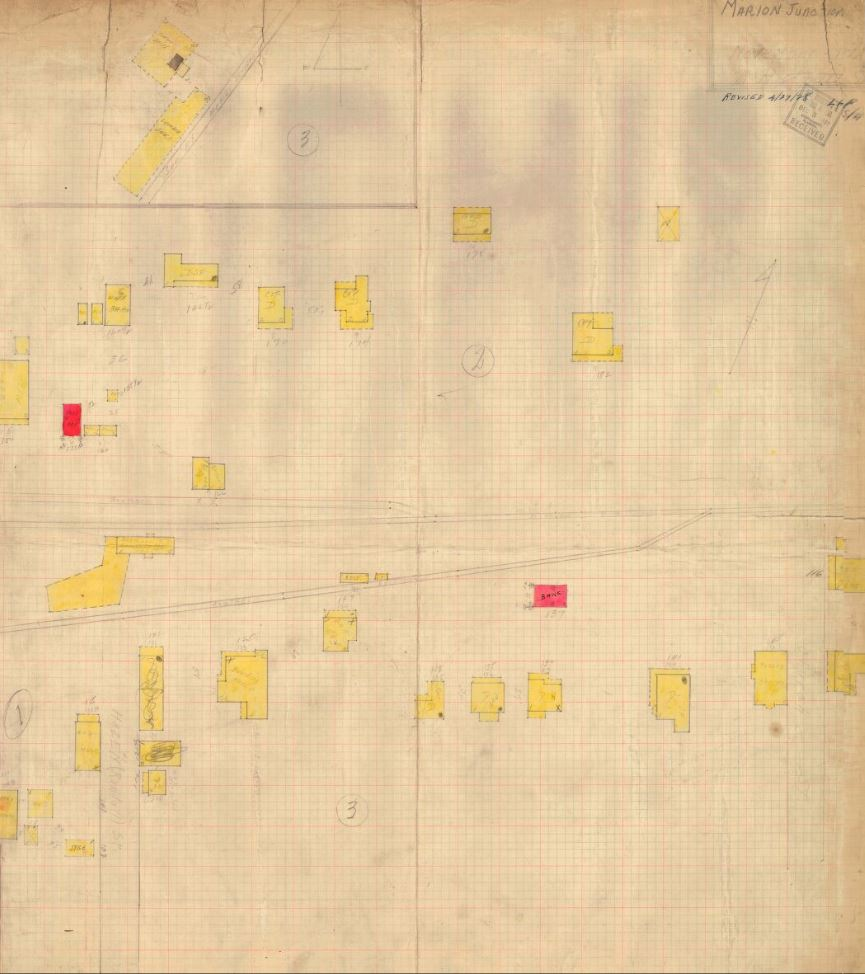
- 1921 fire insurance map of Marion Junction

- Location in Alabama Marion Junction (the United States)
- Coordinates: 32°26′14″N 87°14′20″W
- Country: United States
- State: Alabama
- County: Dallas
- Elevation: 207 ft (63 m)

Population (2000)
  - Total: 1,904
- Time zone: UTC-6 (Central (CST))
  - Summer (DST): UTC-5 (CDT)
- ZIP code: 36759
- Area code: 251
- GNIS feature ID: 155147

Marion Junction, also known as Bridges, is an unincorporated community in Dallas County, Alabama.

It is west of Selma, Alabama, and south of Marion, Alabama.

A site near Marion Junction known as Harrell Station is an important paleontological site where dinosaur and many other fossil species have been found.
