= News and Letters Committees =

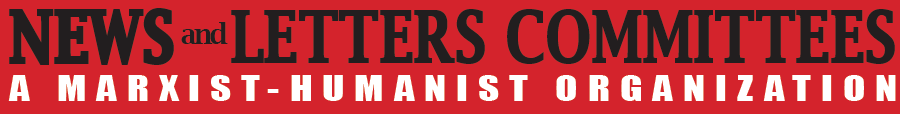
- Founder: Raya Dunayevskaya
- Founded: 1955
- Preceded by: Correspondence Publishing Committee
- Newspaper: News & Letters
- Ideology: Marxist humanism; Radical feminism; Socialism; Anti-Stalinism
- Political position: Far-left

Website
- www.newsandletters.org

News and Letters Committees is a small socialist organization in the United States.

== History ==
Founded in 1955 by Raya Dunayevskaya, the Committees trace their origin to a split in the Correspondence Publishing Committee, which had been led by C. L. R. James and Dunayevskaya. The organization publishes a newspaper, News & Letters, edited from 1955 to 1983 by Charles Denby (born Simon Owens), that tries to unite activist struggles to transform the world with what it calls the "philosophy of liberation" of Karl Marx and Marxist humanism.

== Views ==
News and Letters Committees is committed to the abolition of capitalism, the establishment of what it calls "a new human society," and women's liberation. It supports freedom struggles of workers, African-Americans and other people of color, women, and youth, and it opposes heterosexism against gays, lesbians, bisexuals, and transsexuals. It has opposed both "private" capitalism and the former Stalinist states, which it regarded as state-capitalist, and has opposed the imperialism of both. In recent years, it has opposed what it regards as imperialist wars waged by the U.S. (and its allies) in Afghanistan and Iraq, as well as Islamic fundamentalism and non-state terrorism. Arguing that a new, human society is the only viable alternative to permanent war and terrorism, it supports the struggles of what it regards as democratic, secular, anti-imperialist organizations of women and workers in Iraq and Afghanistan.

Partly as a response to the past decade's movement against global capitalism and its slogan, "Another World is Possible," News and Letters Committees calls for and seeks to help develop what it calls a "philosophically grounded alternative to capitalism," rooted in the theory of post-capitalist human development that Marx sketched in his 1875 Critique of the Gotha Program. The organization has also paid particular attention to the rights of prisoners in the United States and published a short book, Voices from Within the Prison Walls, on the topic in 1998.

== Organization ==
There are News and Letters Committees in a small number of cities in the United States, including Chicago, Detroit, Los Angeles, Memphis, New York City, and the San Francisco Bay Area. Unusually for a Marxist organisation, the groups are freely associated, and work together through a decentralized committee.

== Publications ==
The group's major publication is News & Letters.

Members of News and Letters Committees occasionally contribute to other political journals with somewhat related outlooks, such as New Politics, and to theoretical journals. In addition, one of the two Co-National Organizers, Olga Domanski, is listed as an editor of Lexington Books' Raya Dunayevskaya Series in Marxism and Humanism, which includes books by Dunayevskaya and others, including The Power of Negativity, a posthumous collection of Dunayevskaya's writings on the dialectic in G. W. F. Hegel and in Marx.

== See also ==
- Johnson–Forest Tendency
