= Raya Dunayevskaya =

American philosopher and activist (1910–1987)

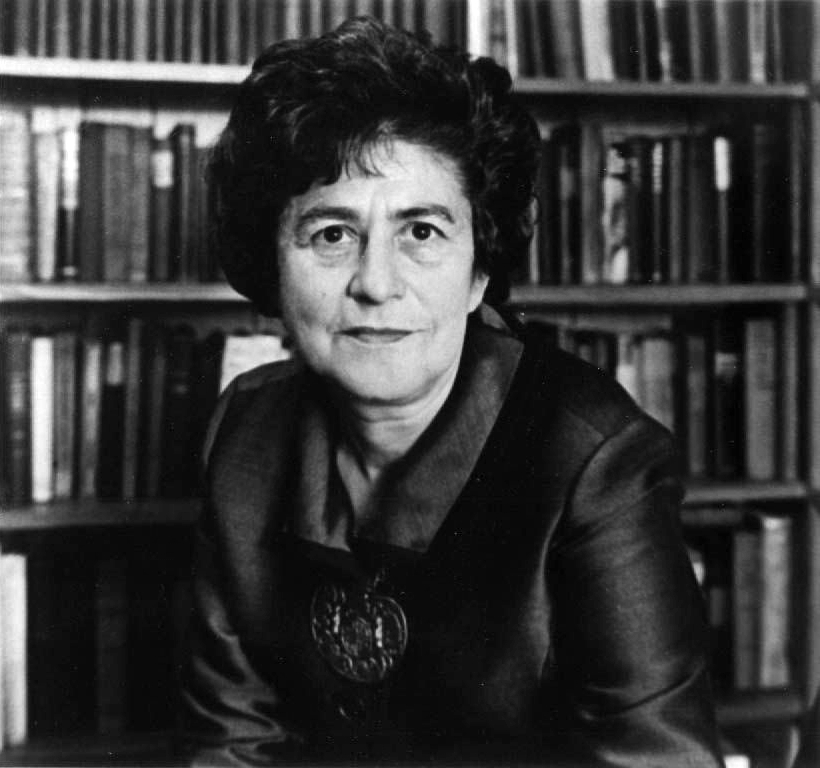
- Dunayevskaya c. 1960s
- Born: Raya Shpigel; May 1, 1910; Podolia Governorate, Russian Empire (today Vinnytsia Oblast, Ukraine)
- Died: June 9, 1987 (aged 77); Chicago, Illinois, U.S.
- Other names: Freddie Forest; Rae Spiegel; Rae Dwyer; Freddie James
- Political party: Socialist Workers Party (before 1940); Workers Party (1940–1947); Socialist Workers Party (1947–1951); Correspondence Publishing Committee (1951–1955); News and Letters Committees (1955-1987)
- Movement: Johnson–Forest Tendency
- Spouse: John Dwyer

Philosophical work
- Era: 20th-century philosophy
- Region: Western philosophy
- School: Western Marxism, Marxist humanism, Hegelian Marxism, Marxist feminism
- Main interests: Social theory, social revolution, social movements, dialectical philosophy, Marxist praxis, women's liberation
- Notable ideas: State capitalism, "movement from practice that is itself a form of theory", absolute negativity as new beginning

Raya Dunayevskaya (born Raya Shpigel, Рая Шпигель; May 1, 1910 – June 9, 1987), later Rae Spiegel, also known by the pseudonym Freddie Forest, was an American political writer and philosopher who founded the philosophy of Marxist humanism in the United States. At one time Leon Trotsky's secretary, she later split with him and ultimately founded the organization News and Letters Committees and was its leader until her death.

== Background ==
Of Lithuanian Jewish descent, Dunayevskaya was born Raya Shpigel in the Podolia Governorate of the Russian Empire (present-day Ukraine) on May 1, 1910, and emigrated to the United States in 1922 (her name changed to Rae Spiegel) and joined the revolutionary movement in her childhood.

== Career ==
=== Trotskyism ===
Active in the Communist Party USA youth organization, she was expelled at age 18 and thrown down a flight of stairs when she suggested that her local comrades should find out Leon Trotsky's response to his expulsion from the Soviet Communist Party and the Comintern. By the following year she found a group of independent Trotskyists in Boston, led by Antoinette Buchholz Konikow, an advocate of birth control and legal abortion. In the 1930s, she adopted her mother's maiden name Dunayevskaya.

Without getting permission from the U.S. Trotskyist organization, she went to Mexico in 1937 to serve as Trotsky's Russian language secretary during his exile there.

=== Independent ===
Having returned to Chicago in 1938 after the deaths of her father and brother, she broke with Trotsky in 1939 when he continued to maintain that the Soviet Union was a "workers' state" even after the Molotov–Ribbentrop Pact. She opposed any notion that workers should be asked to defend this "workers' state" which had signed a non-aggression pact with Nazi Germany. Along with theorists such as C. L. R. James, and later Tony Cliff, Dunayevskaya argued that the Soviet Union had become "state capitalist". Toward the end of her life, she stated that what she called "my real development" only began after her break with Trotsky.

Her simultaneous study of the Russian economy and of Marx's early writings (later known as the Economic and Philosophical Manuscripts of 1844), led to her theory that not only was the USSR a "state capitalist" society, but that "state capitalism" was a new world stage. Much of her initial analysis was published in The New International in 1942–1943.

=== Workers Party ===
In 1940, she was involved in the split in the Socialist Workers Party (SWP) that led to the formation of the Workers Party (WP), with which she shared an objection to Trotsky's characterisation of the Soviet Union as a "degenerated workers' state". Within the WP, she formed the Johnson–Forest Tendency alongside C. L. R. James (she being "Freddie Forest" and he "J. R. Johnson", named for their party cadre names). The tendency argued that the Soviet Union was "state capitalist", while the WP majority maintained that it was bureaucratic collectivist.

=== Socialist Workers Party ===
Differences within the WP steadily widened, and in 1947, after a brief period of independent existence during which they published a series of documents, the tendency returned to the ranks of the SWP. Their membership in the SWP was based on a shared insistence that there was a pre-revolutionary situation just around the corner, and the shared belief that a Leninist party must be in place to take advantage of the coming opportunities.

By 1951, with the failure of their shared perspective to materialize, the tendency developed a theory that rejected Leninism and saw the workers as being spontaneously revolutionary. This was borne out for them by the 1949 U.S. miners' strike. In later years, they were to pay close attention to automation, especially in the automobile industry, which they came to see as paradigmatic of a new stage of capitalism. This led to the tendency to leave the SWP again to begin independent work.

After more than a decade of developing the theory of state capitalism, Dunayevskaya continued her study of the Hegelian dialectic by taking on a task the Johnson–Forest Tendency had set itself: exploring Hegel's Phanomenologie Des Geistes. In 1954, she initiated a decades-long correspondence with the critical theorist Herbert Marcuse, in which the necessity and freedom dialectic in Hegel and Marx became a focal point of contention. She advanced an interpretation of Hegel's absolutes holding that they involved a dual movement: a movement from practice that is itself a form of theory and a movement from theory reaching to philosophy. She considered these 1953 letters to be "the philosophic moment" from which the whole development of Marxist Humanism flowed.

=== News and Letters Committees ===
In 1953 Dunayevskaya moved to Detroit, where she was to live until 1984. In 1954–1955, she and C. L. R. James engaged in a split. In 1955, she founded her own organization, News and Letters Committees, and a Marxist-Humanist newspaper, News & Letters, which remains in publication today. The newspaper covers women's struggles, the liberation of workers, people of color, LGBT rights, and the disability rights movement, while not separating that coverage from philosophical and theoretical articles. The organization split in 2008–2009 and the U.S. Marxist-Humanists (later to become the International Marxist-Humanist Organization) was formed.

Dunayevskaya wrote what came to be known as her "trilogy of revolution": Marxism and Freedom: From 1776 Until Today (1958), Philosophy and Revolution (1973), and Rosa Luxemburg, Women's Liberation, and Marx's Philosophy of Revolution (1982). In addition, she selected and introduced a collection of writings, published in 1985, Women's Liberation and the Dialectics of Revolution. During the last year of her life, she was working on a new book which she had tentatively titled, Dialectics of Organization and Philosophy: The 'Party' and Forms of Organization Born Out of Spontaneity.

== Death and legacy ==
Dunayevskaya died on June 9, 1987.

Her speeches, letters, publications, notes, recordings and other items are located in the Walter P. Reuther Library at Wayne State University in Detroit. Microfilm copies of the collection are available from the WSU Archives of Labor and Urban Affairs and PDF copies are online at the Raya Dunayevskaya Memorial Fund website. Guides to the collection are available from News and Letters Committees and in PDF form at the RDMF website.

== Bibliography ==
=== Books ===
- Trilogy of Revolution
  - Marxism and Freedom: From 1776 Until Today. [1958] 2000. Humanity Books. ISBN 1-57392-819-4.
  - Philosophy and Revolution: from Hegel to Sartre and from Marx to Mao. Third ed. 1989. Columbia University Press. ISBN 0-231-07061-6.
  - Rosa Luxemburg, Women's Liberation, and Marx's Philosophy of Revolution. 1991. University of Illinois Press. ISBN 0-252-01838-9.
- Other
  - Women's Liberation and the Dialectics of Revolution: Reaching for the Future. 1996. Wayne State University Press. ISBN 0-8143-2655-2.
  - The Marxist-Humanist Theory of State-Capitalism. 1992. News & Letters Committee. ISBN 0-914441-30-2.
  - The Power of Negativity: Selected Writings on the Dialectic in Hegel and Marx. 2002. Lexington Books. ISBN 0-7391-0266-4. Image

=== Articles ===
- "The Shock of Recognition and the Philosophic Ambivalence of Lenin". Telos, No. 5 (Spring 1970). New York: Telos Press.

=== Introductions ===
- Lou Turner and John Alan, Frantz Fanon, Soweto & American Black Thought; new introduction by Raya Dunayevskaya. – new expanded edition, Chicago: News and Letters, 1986.

=== Archives ===
- Raya Dunayevskaya Papers, Walter P. Reuther Library, Detroit, Michigan. The first portion of the collection exists as organized and donated by Ms. Dunayevskaya and relates to the development of Marxist-Humanism. The second portion was donated after Ms. Dunayevskaya's death and relates her last writings and unfinished works. Documents range from 1924-1987. PDF copies are online at the Raya Dunayevskaya Memorial Fund website. Guides to the collection are available from News and Letters Committees and in PDF form at the RDMF website.
- Some personal manuscripts, letters and pamphlets are held in the Mitchell Library, Glasgow, as part of the Harry McShane Collection.

== See also ==
- Chaulieu–Montal Tendency
