= Solidarity unionism =

Model of labor organizing

Solidarity unionism is a model of labor organizing in which the workers themselves formulate strategy and take action against the company directly without mediation from government or paid union representatives. The term originated in a 1978 book Labor Law for the Rank and Filer by Staughton Lynd who described a model of organizing promoted in the early 20th century by the Industrial Workers of the World which eschews the formality and bureaucracy of government-recognized unions, which Lynd and co-author Daniel Gross refer to as "business unions."

Supporters feel that enabling a union which does not need to win support from a majority of workers makes it easier to organize and gain workplace improvements. This model was tried in the early 2000s by the IWW to organize Starbucks unions in the United States.

== History ==
According to the Industrial Workers of the World, solidarity unionism is a term coined by Alice and Staughton Lynd, but also is inspired by works from Martin Glaberman, C.L.R. James, and Stan Weir.

The IWW's current advocacy of solidarity unionism originated in 2002 from the article "Open Source Unionism: A Proposal to American Labor" by Richard B. Freeman and Joel Rogers. The text argues that traditional unionism was not working, and that to increase membership, open-source unionism (OSU) would welcome members before they achieved majority status. OSU would treat union membership as a long-term civic and social affiliation, not just a workplace contract.

Throughout 2002 and 2003, then IWW General Secretary Treasurer, Alexis Buss, developed the idea and wrote a column in the Industrial Worker called "The Minority Report" which had 5 editions spanning from July 2002 to June 2003. These articles say, that a workplace committee can organize for a contract, with or without a National Labour Relations Board (NLRB) certification election, and that the difference between staff-driven unionism and solidarity unionism, is that in staff-driven unionism, the staff negotiates and holds responsibility for the enforcement of that contract, while with solidarity unionism, the workplace committee would assume those responsibilities.

== See also ==
- Anarcho-syndicalism
- Industrial Workers of the World
