= Socialist Action (United States) =

Trotskyist political party in the United States

- Abbreviation: SAct
- Secretary-General: Jeff Mackler
- Founded: 1983
- Split from: Socialist Workers Party
- Newspaper: Socialist Action
- Youth wing: Youth for Socialist Action
- Ideology: Communism; Trotskyism
- Political position: Far-left
- International affiliation: fraternal relations with the Fourth International (until 2025)
- Members in elected offices: 0

Website
- socialistaction.org

Socialist Action is a Trotskyist political party in the United States. SAct formed in 1983, when its members were expelled from the Socialist Workers Party.

SAct describes itself as a revolutionary socialist party fighting for true democracy, because capitalist states "cannot be used as tools of the working class, but have to be smashed".

Notable members include Jeff Mackler.

== History ==
=== Origins ===
In 1983, the Socialist Workers Party (SWP) expelled two groups: First, the Fourth Internationalist Tendency (FIT). Second, the group that would coalesce around the Socialist Action (SAct) newspaper. SAct argued that they were expelled for defending Trotskyist ideas of Permanent Revolution, class independence, and continued support for the Fourth International. The first issue of its newspaper contained no listing of an editorial board.

=== Subsequent history ===
In 1985, SAct split in two. Those who split created Socialist Unity (SU). In 1986, SU merged with Workers Power and the International Socialists to form Solidarity.

After the split, SAct reorganized as a Trotskyist party. SAct planned a Central America solidarity conference.

In 1992, during the Gulf War, SAct was active in the San Francisco Bay Area antiwar movement through the National Campaign Against the War in the Middle East, which competed with the Workers World Party-led Coalition Against a Vietnam War in the Middle East.

In 2004, SAct won the right to refuse to disclose its campaign donors, because of demonstrable government harassment of socialist candidates, as did Communist Party USA, Freedom Socialist Party, and Socialist Workers Party.

In 2019, a minority faction was expelled or resigned membership from Socialist Action and re-established as Socialist Resurgence.

=== Tendency for a Revolutionary International ===
Socialist Action has been associated with a minority current in and around the Fourth International known as the Tendency for a Revolutionary International. In 2017, Socialist Action published a statement titled "Opposition formed in the Fourth International", which criticized the International's orientation toward broad anti-capitalist parties and argued for renewed emphasis on building revolutionary parties and an international revolutionary organization. The statement's signatories included Socialist Action national secretary Jeff Mackler, Socialist Action newspaper editor Michael Schreiber, and Socialist Action Political Committee member Christine Marie, along with supporters from Canada, France, Greece, Italy and the Spanish state.

In a 2022 political resolution, Socialist Action stated that it sought to build a "revolutionary Fourth International". A separate Socialist Action text from 2022 stated that the organization participated in Fourth International discussions only in a fraternal capacity, citing United States legislation restricting membership in international socialist organizations.

At the Fourth International's 18th World Congress in 2025, the International reported that it had debated differing positions on the war in Ukraine and had decided to break off relations with Socialist Action, which it said defended a campist position.

Socialist Action maintains close fraternal relations with Socialist Action (Canada) and describes it as its Canadian sister party.

== Ideology ==
Socialist Action is a Trotskyist and Revolutionary socialist party.

The party has claimed that the Euromaidan revolution in Ukraine was a "US-backed fascist coup", alongside claiming that Ukraine banned the Russian language. The Fourth International congress deemed positions of Socialist Action campist and decided to break off relations with the organisation in 2025.

== Election results ==
Socialist Action (SA) has fielded electoral candidates in the United States for local, state, and federal offices.

One SA member, Adam Ritscher, won an uncontested election. No SA member has won a contested election.

=== Presidential elections ===
Year	Presidential candidate	Vice presidential candidate	Popular votes	%	Electoral votes	Result	Ballot access	Notes	Ref
2020	Jeff Mackler	Heather Bradford	0	0.00%	0	Lost	0 / 538	SA failed to achieve ballot access or official write-in access in any state	
2016	Jeff Mackler	Karen Schraufnagel	15	0.00%	0	Lost	0 / 538	SA only obtained official write-in access in New York	

In 2016, SAct nominated their first presidential ticket, selecting national secretary Jeff Mackler for president and Karen Schraufnagel for vice-president.

In 2020, SAct again nominated Mackler. SAct again gained no ballot access or write-in status in any state, and thus received zero votes.

=== Congressional elections ===
Year	Candidate	Chamber	State	District	Votes	%	Result	Notes	Ref
2018	Fred Linck	Senate	Connecticut	At-Large	70	0.01%	Lost	write-in candidate	
2010	Christopher Hutchinson	House	Connecticut	CT-1	955	0.4%	Lost	write-in candidate	
2006	Jeff Mackler	Senate	California	At-Large	108	0.00%	Lost	write-in candidate	

In 2018, SA member and Iraq War veteran Fred Linck hoped to run as Socialist Action candidate for United States Senate in Connecticut. The party submitted over 11,000 signatures to the Connecticut Secretary of State, but too many were disqualified for Linck to be placed on the November ballot. Linck asserted that local officials incorrectly invalidated signatures. Despite being left off the ballot, Linck continued to run for office as an official write-in candidate, and ultimately received 70 votes, or 0.01%.

=== Local elections ===
Year	Candidate	Office	Area	State	District	Votes	%	Result	Notes	Ref
2006	Adam Ritscher	Board of Supervisors	Douglas County	Wisconsin	6th	42	100%	Won	Uncontested election	

In 1988, SA member Sylvia Weinstein ran for San Francisco Board of Education, in which she won 21,000 votes. Weinstein also ran in 1985 and 1986.

== See also ==
- American Left
- Democratic Socialists of America
- Socialist Action (Canada) - works closely with the US Socialist Action
- Socialist Alternative (United States)
- Green Party of the United States
- History of left-wing politics in the United States
