= Paul Le Blanc (historian) =

American historian

- Born: Paul Joseph Le Blanc; 1947 (age 78–79)
- Citizenship: United States
- Occupation: Historian
- Title: Professor of History

Academic background
- Education: University of Pittsburgh

Academic work
- Discipline: Modern History
- Sub-discipline: Marxism, Leninism, Trotskyism
- Institutions: La Roche University
- Website: laroche.edu

Paul Joseph Le Blanc (born 1947) is an American historian at La Roche University in Pittsburgh, as well as a labor and socialist activist. He has written and edited more than 30 books on topics such as Leon Trotsky and Rosa Luxemburg.

== Background ==
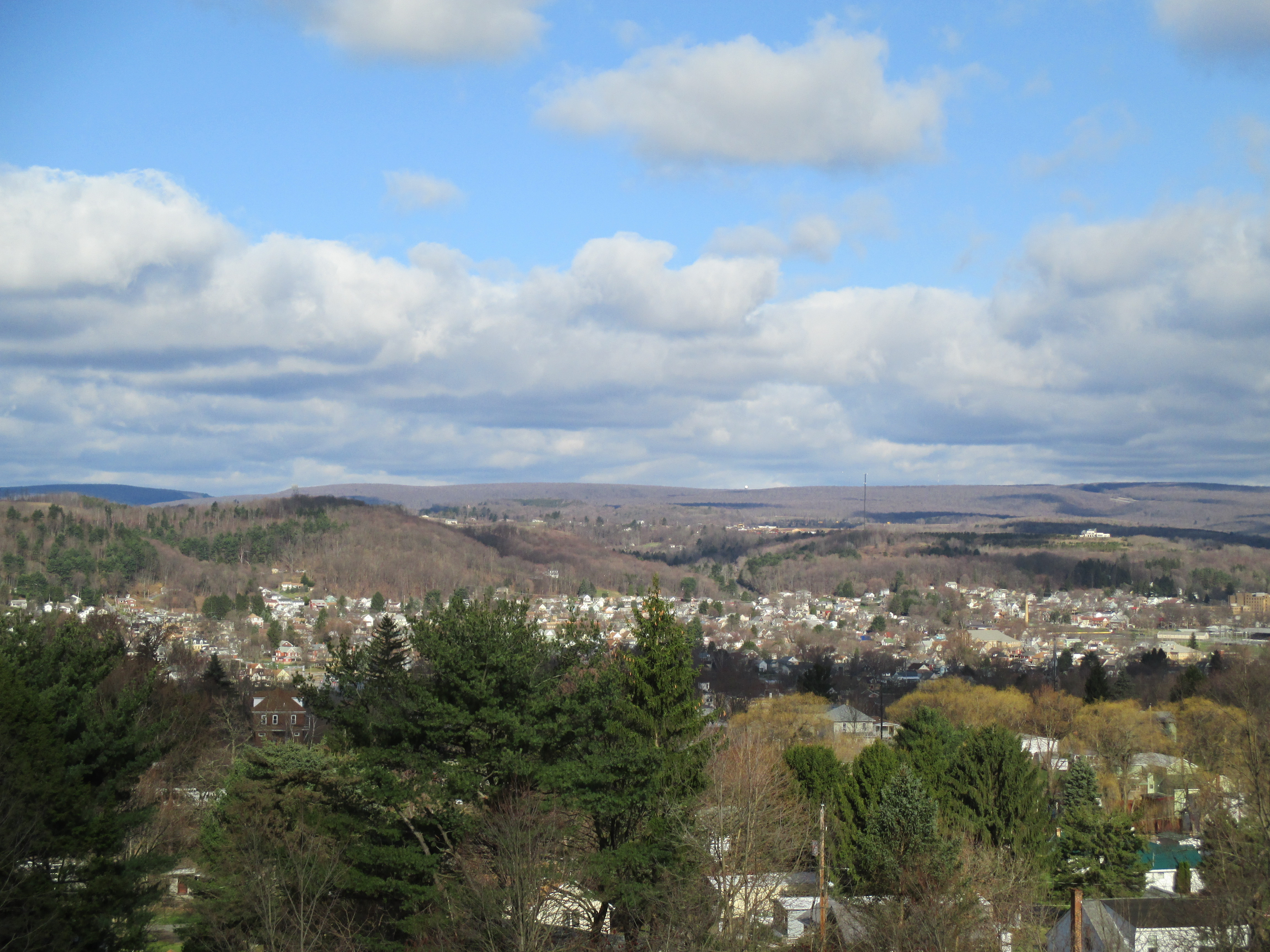
View toward the from Clearfield, Pennsylvania, Le Blanc's childhood home

Le Blanc was born in 1947 in Huntingdon, Pennsylvania and spent his childhood in Clearfield, Pennsylvania. His parents, Gaston Le Blanc and Shirley Harris, were labor activists; he has two sisters.

Le Blanc studied at the University of Pittsburgh, focusing on history and receiving a Bachelor of Arts degree in 1971, a Master of Arts degree in 1980, and a Doctor of Philosophy degree in 1989.

== Career ==
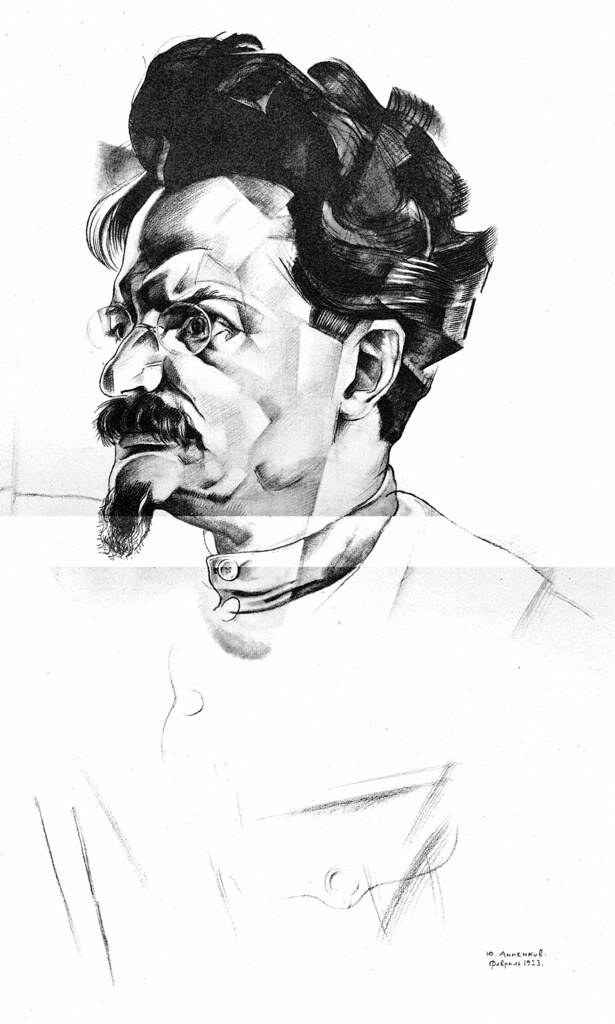
Leon Trotsky (here in cubist Yury Annenkov's 1922 portrait) is a lifelong subject of Le Blanc's

In 1965, Le Blanc joined the “New Left” group Students for a Democratic Society (SDS). In 1966, as a conscientious objector, he worked for the Quaker-based American Friends Service Committee in Pittsburgh and Baltimore. In the early 1970s, he served on the board of the Pittsburgh Peace and Freedom Center and the coordinating committee of the National Peace Action Coalition (1971–1974). He opposed the Vietnam War and supported anti-racist activity – most prominently as part of the Pittsburgh Black Construction Coalition of 1969 – pro-feminist activities, defense of Latin American political prisoners, and Central America solidarity work.

In the 1990s, he became active in the Thomas Merton Center (Pittsburgh). He has been a member of the Socialist Workers Party (USA), the Fourth Internationalist Tendency, Solidarity (United States), and the International Socialist Organization (until it terminated in 2019). He was active in efforts to create a Labor Party. He is a member of the Democratic Socialists of America.

Since 2000, Le Blanc has supported the Green Party. He has opposed war and militarism, including US military intervention in Iraq and Afghanistan. He also collaborated closely with South African poet and global justice activist Dennis Brutus in building Pittsburgh participation in World Social Forums taking place in Porto Alegre, Brazil, in 2003 and Mumbai, India, in 2004.

In 2000, Le Blanc joined the faculty of La Roche College (renamed La Roche University in March 2019) as Dean of the School of Arts and Sciences (2003–2009) and as a professor of history.

He has lectured for the International Institute for Research and Education and the Rosa Luxemburg Foundation and writes for the Center for Economic Research and Social Change's International Socialist Review.

== Personal life ==
Le Blanc married and had two sons.

Le Blanc is currently a member of:

- Pittsburghers for Public Transit
- Thomas Merton Center (Pittsburgh)

He has been a member of:

- American Association of University Professors
- American Historical Association
- International Socialist Organization
- Organization of American Historians

== Influences ==
Le Blanc's influences include: David Montgomery, Philip S. Foner, Frank Lovell, Richard N. Hunt, Paul Sweezy, George Breitman, Ernest Mandel, and Michael Löwy.

== Works ==
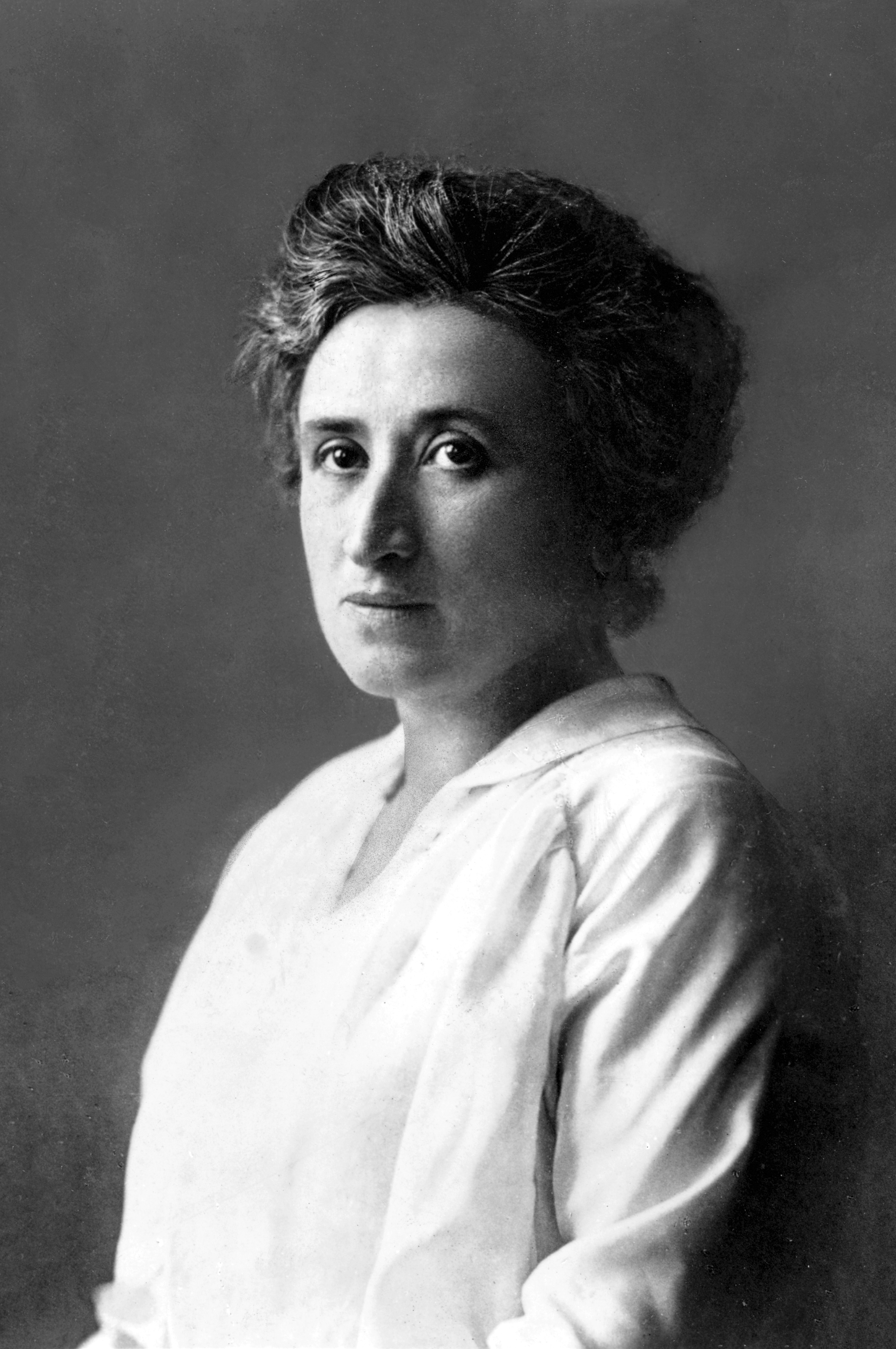
Rosa Luxemburg (here c. 1895-1905) is a lifelong subject of Le Blanc's

Magazines and journals to which he contributes include:

- Dialectical Anthropology
- Green Left Weekly
- International Socialism
- International Socialist Review
- International Viewpoint
- Russian Review
- Jacobin
- Monthly Review
- New Formations: A Journal of Culture, Theory and Politics
- Socialist Worker
- WorkingUSA: The Journal of Labor and Society

Publications include:

- 1984:
  - Permanent Revolution in Nicaragua
  - In Defense of Revolutionary Continuity
- 1988: "Reflections on the Fourth Internationalist Tendency"
- 1990: Lenin and the Revolutionary Party
- 1992: In Defense of American Trotskyism: Revolutionary Principles and Working-Class Democracy
- 1994: C.L.R. James and Revolutionary Marxism
- 1996:
  - Trotskyism in the United States: Historical Essays and Reconsiderations (with George Breitman and Alan M. Wald)
  - From Marx to Gramsci (edited with major introductory essay)
  - "Letter to the Editors" in Solidarity
- 1999:
  - A Short History of the U.S. Working Class
  - Rosa Luxemburg: Reflections and Writings (edited with major introductory essay)
- 2000:
  - Revolutionary Labor Socialist: The Life, Ideas and Comrades of Frank Lovell
  - U.S. Labor in the Twentieth Century (edited with John Hinshaw)
  - The Working-Class Movement in America, by Eleanor Marx and Edward Aveling (edited with introductory essay)
- 2003: Black Liberation and the American Dream (edited with major introductory essay)
- 2006: Marx, Lenin, and the Revolutionary Experience: Studies of Communism and Radicalism in the Age of Globalization
- 2008:
  - Lenin: Revolution, Democracy, Socialism: Selected Writings (edited with introductory essay)
  - "History on the Printed Page" in Solidarity
  - "Reluctant Memoir, Part 2" in Solidarity
  - "Does Lenin Still Matter?" in International Socialist Review
- 2009: International Encyclopedia of Revolution and Protest
- 2011:
  - Work and Struggle: Voices from U.S. Labor Radicalism (edited with introductory essays)
  - Socialism or Barbarism: Selected Writings of Rosa Luxemburg (co-ed. with Helen C. Scott)
  - "Lenin’s Marxism"
- 2012: Leon Trotsky: Writings From Exile (co-edited with Kunal Chattopadhyay)
- 2013: A Freedom Budget for All Americans: Recapturing the Promise of the Civil Rights Movement in the Struggle for Economic Justice Today (with Michael D. Yates)
- 2014:
  - Unfinished Leninism: The Rise and Return of a Revolutionary Doctrine
  - Leon Trotsky and the Organizational Principles of the Revolutionary Party (with Dianne Feeley and Thomas Twiss)
  - The "American Exceptionalism of Jay Lovestone and His Comrades, 1929-1940 (co-ed. with Tim Davenport)
- 2014: "The Third American Revolution" in Imagine: Living in a Socialist USA(
- 2015: Leon Trotsky
- 2016: The Complete Works of Rosa Luxemburg, Volume II: Economic Writings 2
- 2017:
  - Rosa Remix
  - October Song: Bolshevik Triumph, Communist Tragedy, 1917-1924
  - October 1917: Workers in Power
  - Left Americana: The Radical Heart of US History
  - "The ‘American Exceptionalism’ of Jay Lovestone and His Comrades, 1929-1940" in Dissident Marxism in the United States, Volume I
- 2018:
  - US Trotskyism 1928–1965, Part I: Emergence
  - US Trotskyism 1928–1965, Part II: Endurance
  - Revolutionary Studies: Essays in Plain Marxism
- 2019:
  - Living Flame: The Revolutionary Passion of Rosa Luxemburg
  - US Trotskyism 1928–1965, Part III: Resurgence
