= Love and Rage =

Love and Rage may refer to:

- Love and Rage (1998 film), British-Irish-German film
- Love and Rage (2009 film), Danish film
- Love and Rage (organization), American anarchist federation
- Love & Rage, 2021 music album released by American singer-songwriter Carsie Blanton
