= Robert Lynd =

Robert Lynd may refer to:

- Robert Staughton Lynd (1892–1970), American sociologist
- Robert Wilson Lynd (1879–1949), Irish writer

== See also ==
- Bob Lind (born 1942), singer/songwriter
