= International Socialists (United States) =

- Leader: Hal Draper
- Founded: 1964
- Dissolved: 1986
- Merger of: Independent Socialist Club; Revolutionary Socialist Caucus; Students for a Democratic Society; Revolutionary Workers Committee
- Split from: Socialist Party of America
- Preceded by: Independent Socialist League
- Merged into: Solidarity
- Newspaper: Workers' Power
- Ideology: Third camp Trotskyism
- Political position: Far-left

The International Socialists was a Third Camp Trotskyist group active in the United States between 1968 and 1985.

== History ==
The roots of the IS went back to the fall of 1964 when the Berkeley locals of the Socialist Party-Social Democratic Federation and Young People's Socialist League left with sixteen members to found the Independent Socialist Club led by Hal Draper and Joel Geier. At first it consisted mainly of ex-Independent Socialist League members who had disagreed with the decision to merge the ISL into the SP-SDF in 1958 and had become uncomfortable with the positions taken by Max Shachtman and the Realignment Caucus within the party, i.e. entry into the Democratic Party, and an orientation toward the established union leadership and liberal integrationist forces within the Civil Rights Movement. The new group wished to revive the tendency represented by the ISL and the third camp. While still basing its ideas on the literature of the ISL, as the new organization grew through the 1960s, the proportion of former members of the ISL declined, until they were a small handful by 1970.

The following year a second ISC was founded in Berkeley (one on campus, one in town) and another in New York. In September 1967 a conference was held in New York and the clubs were federated under the umbrella Independent Socialist Clubs of America. A quarterly, Independent Socialist or I.S. had begun in early 1967 and became the organ of the new group.

The group worked within the CORE, the Berkeley Free Speech Movement and help initiate the California Peace and Freedom Party, which it saw as a form of "independent political action ... leading eventually, or hoping to crystallize the development of a Workers party". The movement recruited many members from its work in the PFP and among Students for a Democratic Society. When the SDS imploded in 1969 many of its members joined the Independent Socialists, including the Revolutionary Socialist Caucus, and significant parts of the SDS chapters at the University of Chicago, University of Michigan, CCNY, and Madison. The Revolutionary Workers Committee at Detroit also joined. With all of these additions it was decided that a national organization should be created, more centralized than the former federation of autonomous clubs. Thus the "International Socialists" were formed at a convention in September 1969.

More changed than just the name. The national office was transferred from New York to Detroit. The group's periodical, which had moved from New York to Berkeley, was also moved to Detroit and rechristened Workers' Power. National Secretary Joel Geier noted that while they had formerly been oriented toward the student, anti-war, and women's liberation movements, they would now focus on the industrial working class. They developed a three pronged strategy that included building rank and file within the unions, caucuses for black and women workers, and urging independent political action of the workers organizations. This strategy deemphasized the long term program of socialist revolution, instead focusing on day-to-day issues. As they put it "Rank and file groups usually arise around a specific event, incident or issue. It is the tasks of socialists and advanced militants to move the group in a broader programmatic direction. This is not done by putting forth a score of demands all at once. New demands and concepts should be introduced in a logical and relevant manner." A group of member who were uncomfortable with this distancing from Trotskyist ideology broke away in 1973 and formed the Revolutionary Socialist League in 1973, taking about a third of the membership.

Of all the Trotskyist groups that attempted a turn toward industry in the 1970s, the IS was the most successful. They became a force within opposition movements within several unions. These included the United Action Caucus within Local 1101 in the Communication Workers of America, the opposition to the leadership of the United Mine Workers which eventually led to the election of Arnold Miller as president, the opposition within the National Maritime Union, and in the International Longshore and Warehouse Union where they led a successful court fight against the expulsion of IS member Stan Weir.

However they were most successful within the Teamsters. Here they worked within the Teamsters Rank and File Caucus, which was organized around the issue of alleged misspending of pension funds by union officials. They also were an important element within the Teamsters for a Decent Contract later in the decade. These efforts helped lead to the creation of Teamsters for a Democratic Union. Through these activities the IS was able to recruit a number of important rank-and-file leaders, most of whom later left the group during its splits, such as that forming Workers Power.

The IS organized regional conferences of the opposition movements within labor unions during the mid-1970s, and in the late 1970s formed the "Labor Education and Research Project." This "Project" began publication of Labor Notes, which carried news on rank-and-file reform movements within the unions and began regular conferences and workshops on re-radicalizing the labor movement.

Meanwhile, the group lost some of its original members. Hal Draper left the organization in 1971. He claimed that the IS was embracing dual unionism, and felt that the IS was becoming a "micro-sect" and it was best to participate in personal, rather than organized political activity.

IS had long had informal links with the International Socialists in Britain led by Tony Cliff. By the early 1970s some members were becoming influenced by that group and came to reject the labeling of Stalinist states as bureaucratic collectivist in favor of Cliff's state capitalism theory. These members were also disturbed by the abandonment, as they saw it, of IS's traditional policy on building rank and file caucuses in the unions as well as by the stance adopted by the leadership around Geier on the then-current upheaval in Portugal. By 1977 this group had formally constituted itself as the Left Tendency and was then expelled, after which it founded the International Socialist Organization.

Around the same time another tendency came into opposition to IS's leadership and split to form a new group called Workers Power. By the early 1980s the IS had decided that a more pluralist sort of revolutionary socialist organization was required and merged with Workers Power and Socialist Unity to form Solidarity in 1986.

== Works ==
- Independent socialist New York, N.Y. New York Independent Socialist Club, Vol. 1, no. 1 (January/February 1967)-v. 1, no. 7 (October 1968)
- I.S.: independent socialist. Berkeley, Ca. : Independent Socialist Clubs of America, No. 8 (March 1969)-no. 20 (June 1970)
- Book burning and censorship at U.C. Berkeley, Calif. : Independent Socialist Club, 1964
- The mind of Clark Kerr by Hal Draper Berkeley, Calif. : Independent Socialist Club, 1964
- Independent socialism, a perspective for the left Berkeley, Calif. : Independent Socialist Club, 1964 (ISC pamphlet #1)
- Third camp; the independent socialist view of war and peace policy by Hal Draper and Julius Jacobson Berkeley, Calif. : Independent Socialist Club, 1965 (ISC pamphlet #2)
- MacBird! by Barbara Garson Berkeley, Calif. : Independent Socialist Club, 1966
- The Two Souls of Socialism by Hal Draper Berkeley, Calif. : Independent Socialist Club, 1966 (ISC pamphlet #3)
- Toward the working class; a position paper for the New Left by Hal Draper, Kim Moody, Fred Eppsteiner and Mike Flug Berkeley, Calif. : Independent Socialist Club, 1966 (ISC pamphlet #4)
- Independent socialism and war; articles by Hal Draper Berkeley, Calif. : Independent Socialist Club, 1964 (Independent socialist clipping-books #2)
- A new era of labor revolt: on the job vs. official unions by Stan Weir Berkeley, Calif. : Independent Socialist Club, 1966
- The case for a new politics by Michael Shute Berkeley, Calif. : Independent Socialist Club, 1966
- In defense of black power; a position paper by Sy Landy and Charles Capper Berkeley, Calif. : Independent Socialist Club, 1966
- The fight for independence in Vietnam by Hal Draper Berkeley, Calif. : Independent Socialist Club, 1966
- Defend the ghetto uprisings Berkeley, Calif. : Independent Socialist Club, 1967
- The first Israel-Arab war, 1948-49 by Hal Draper and Al Findley Berkeley, Calif. : Independent Socialist Club, 1967 (Independent socialist clipping-books Xerocopy series #X-2)
- Zionism, Israel, & the Arabs; the historical background of the Middle East tragedy by Hal Draper Berkeley, Calif. : Independent Socialist Club, 1967 (Independent socialist clipping-books #3)
- Karl Marx & Friedrich Engels: articles in the New American cyclopaedia Hal Draper Berkeley ed., Calif. : Independent Socialist Press, 1968 (Independent socialist clipping-books #5)
