= Revolutionary Socialist League (U.S.) =

- Leader: Sy Landy; Ron Tabor
- Founded: 1973
- Dissolved: 1989
- Split from: International Socialists
- Succeeded by: Love and Rage Network
- Ideology: Orthodox Trotskyism; Later: Anarchism
- Political position: Far-left

The Revolutionary Socialist League (RSL) was a Trotskyist group in the United States established in 1973 and disbanded in 1989.

== History ==
The RSL originated in the Revolutionary Tendency within the International Socialists (U.S.) (IS) led by Sy Landy and Ron Tabor. They had three principal differences with the IS: they believed that the IS had abandoned strict adherence to Trotskyism; they felt that the emphasis on the day-to-day work within the trade unions diminished propagating the revolutionary objectives outlined in the Fourth International's transitional program; and they felt that the USSR and the other Communist states were state capitalist, rather than bureaucratic collectivist.

While the RT at first seemed to have the upper hand, with Landy elected national secretary in 1972, by the next year Landy and his faction had been expelled. At the time of the split, the RSL took 100 of the IS's 300 members. The expelled group, now styling itself the Revolutionary Socialist League, adopted generally orthodox Trotskyist positions based on the transitional program including permanent revolution, opposition to popular fronts and the need for a Fourth International. This last position cost them unity with the Class Struggle League, who advocated a Fifth International. Landy wrote "To preserve the program is to preserve the number and out right to it". Despite this the RSL never joined any existing Trotskyist international or attempted to organize a new one. Its sole international organizational tie was with the Revolutionary Marxist League of Jamaica.

The RSL was active within a few unions, particularly United Auto Workers (UAW) and USW and among Hispanic workers in the Los Angeles ILGWU. Within the UAW they organized a "Revolutionary Action Caucus". Outside of organized labor they participated in anti-apartheid and anti-racist movements and developed a prisoner support network.

The RSL was one of the left groups most active in the pre-AIDS gay movement. Rick Miles considered this area "particularly important" because he believed that much of the left suffered from the same homophobia as the rest of society, and because the "gay question" had a direct bearing on their concept of socialism as a "free society" run directly by workers and oppressed people, rather than an authoritarian society run by a state capitalist class. It also emphasized the oppressive nature of the Stalinist countries where homosexuals were repressed. The RSL recruited a minority tendency of the Red Flag Union, a gay socialist collective, to its state capitalist characterization, and they merged into the League in 1977. (A majority of the RFU joined the Spartacist League.) In New York, the RSL was active in the Gay Activists Alliance, its members and sympathizers participating in a polarizing split that proved the end of that organization. RSL members also participated in gay coalitions such as Lavender Left and Christopher Street Liberation Day Committee.

The RSL had its share of organizational difficulties. In early 1974, it suffered its first split. The origins of this split went back to a group called the Communist faction within the Socialist Workers Party that left to SWP to enter IS, and subsequently the RSL. Within the RSL it formed the "Soviet Defensist Minority" before leaving to form the Trotskyist Organization of the United States. Another tendency had left in 1975 to form the Revolutionary Marxist Caucus, which later fused with the Socialist Workers Party. Finally a group led by Sy Landy left in 1976 to form the League for the Revolutionary Party, in part because they disagreed with the RSL's call for the formation of a Labor Party in the US. They also alleged that the leadership of the RSL was acting in a bureaucratic fashion.

Over time, the RSL moved closer to anarchism. In 1985 they released a statement What we stand for that proclaimed their adherence to the ideas of Marx, Engels, Lenin and Trotsky but emphasized the theoretical contributions of Marx and Engels, Trotsky's fight against Stalinism and Lenin's "conception of the party, stress on the importance of national liberation struggles and the anti-statism shown in the State and Revolution". It also identified "with the best of anarchism, particularly its libertarian spirit". Their move away from Leninism is documented in a book by RSL leader Ron Tabor titled A Look at Leninism (ISBN 0-939073-36-6), which collected together a series of articles questioning the fundamentals of Leninism that had appeared as a serial series in The Torch newspaper.

The RSL disbanded in 1989, with about twenty of its remaining members helping in the formation of Love and Rage Network, a revolutionary anarchist newspaper and organization. The RSL met to disband the day before the founding conference of Love and Rage. When Love and Rage disbanded in 1998, the remaining former RSL members, including Ron Tabor, began publishing The Utopian. Some time later they entered the platformist anarchist federation North Eastern Federation of Anarchist Communists.

== League for the Revolutionary Party ==
The League for the Revolutionary Party is a Trotskyist organisation in the United States.

The group was founded by a faction of the now defunct Revolutionary Socialist League in 1976. The RSL had in turn split from the International Socialists in 1973.

The LRP took from the RSL a strong stress on the need for a Leninist party and coupled this with an emphasis on the general strike tactic. They also developed their own version of what is called "state capitalist theory" to explain the class nature of the USSR and similar states. In later years they abandoned use of the term "state capitalist" in favor of the term "statified capitalism, arguing the difference between Stalinist and traditional capitalist countries is in the form that the ruling class holds its property, and that the proletariat is still exploited and surplus value created in the same way. The LRP views the state in Stalinist countries as a weaker form of the capitalist state, less capable of exploiting the workers but still ruling in the interest of the bureaucracy. This form of state is seen as a compromise by the ruling class, sacrificing a portion of profits to pacify the workers and prevent proletarian revolutions. As such, the LRP viewed the collapse of the Soviet Union as a defeat for the workers not because the workers lost control of the state, as many Trotskyists believe, but because of the increased rate of exploitation and destruction of social welfare programs that accompanied the collapse.

The group is based in New York City with a branch in Chicago. It also organizes a group of international co-thinkers called the Communist Organisation for a Fourth International. They publish a journal called Proletarian Revolution, formerly Socialist Voice, to which the late Sy Landy and Walter Daum have been notable contributors.

== Publications ==
- The Torch/La Antorcha Vol. 1], no. 1 (September 1973)-; Ceased in 1989? Published in Highland Park, Michigan from 1973–1977; thereafter in New York
- Revolutionary Party Tendency reply to "Political" Committee charges [New York? : The League?, 1973
- The fight of the revolutionary tendency within the centrist I.S.-USA: documents of struggle : notes on women's liberation [United States? : Revolutionary Socialist League, A Revolutionary Socialist League educational publication #5 1973
- Documents of Struggle: Manifesto of the RSL and Statement of the Revolutionary Tendency of the IS. New York : Revolutionary Socialist League, 1973
- Political Resolution of the Founding Convention: World Crisis and the Fight for Revolutionary Leadership New York : Revolutionary Socialist League, 1973
- The Big Swindle: The Story behind Productivity Drives and How to Fight against the Bosses' Offensive Highland Park, Mich: Revolutionary Socialist League, 1973
- Permanent Revolution: Black Liberation and the American Revolution New York : Revolutionary Socialist League, 1973
- The road to revolution in Britain [United States] : Revolutionary Socialist League Pub. Co., 1974 (Torch pamphlet #4)
- Chile, never again: The Story behind Productivity Drives and How to Fight against the Bosses' Offensive Highland Park, Mich: Revolutionary Socialist League Pub. Co., 1974 (Torch pamphlet)
- China's Foreign Policy: A Reactionary Line. New York: Revolutionary Socialist League Publishing Co., 1976 (Torch pamphlet #3)
- Maoism and the Soviet Union: how the RU (RCP) supports state capitalism Chicago : Haymarket, 1976 (Torch pamphlet #4)
- The rise of state capitalism: how the Russian revolution was smashed by Ron Tabor New York: Revolutionary Socialist League Publishing Co., 1976
- The Russian Revolution (with the Revolutionary Marxist League of Jamaica) New York : Revolutionary Socialist League, 1978 (Revolutionary Socialist Educational Series, #1)
- Imperialism, National Liberation & Socialist Revolution (with the Revolutionary Marxist League of Jamaica) New York : Revolutionary Socialist League, 1979 (Revolutionary Socialist Educational Series, #2)
- Torch supplement on gay liberation, June 1979:Gay liberation through socialist revolution! New York : Revolutionary Socialist League, 1979
- Energy, Environment and the Economic Crisis: The Contributions and Contradictions of Barry Commoner New York : Revolutionary Socialist League, 1980
- Toward a Fighting Student Movement: RSL Position Paper for Kent State Student Conference New York : Revolutionary Socialist League, 1980
- Which Way Forward for the Anti-Klan Movement: A Position Paper by the Revolutionary Socialist League New York : Revolutionary Socialist League, 1980
- Proposals to the National Anti-Klan Network for a "Spring Offensive." New York : Revolutionary Socialist League, 1981
- Toward a fighting anti-draft movement New York : Revolutionary Socialist League, 1981
- Polish Workers Fight for Freedom; Socialism vs. State Capitalism Detroit: Revolutionary Socialist League, 1981
- Socialism and the fight for lesbian and gay liberation by Paul Carson New York: Revolutionary Socialist League, 1982
- Black people in the U.S.: the fight for freedom New York : Revolutionary Socialist League, 1984
- The struggle for workers' power in Poland: Solidarity's unfinished revolution New York : Revolutionary Socialist League, 1984
- Socialism or state capitalism?: the crisis of Trotskyist theory by Ron Tabor and Rod Miller New York : Revolutionary Socialist League, 1984
