= Helen Lynd =

American sociologist and social philosopher

Helen Merrell Lynd
- Born: Helen Merrell; March 17, 1896; La Grange, Illinois, U.S.
- Died: January 30, 1982 (aged 85); Warren, Ohio, U.S.
- Education: Wellesley College, B.A., 1919, Columbia University, M.A, 1922, Columbia University, Ph.D., 1944
- Occupations: Sociologist, social philosopher, professor
- Employer(s): Ossining School for Girls, Miss Master's School, Sarah Lawrence College, Vassar College
- Organization(s): Institute for Social and Religious Research, Rockefeller Foundation, Lincoln School, American Federation of Teachers, American Civil Liberties Union
- Notable work: On Shame and the Search for Identity (author); Middletown: A Study in Contemporary American Culture (coauthor); Middletown in Transition (coauthor)
- Spouse: Robert Staughton Lynd (m. 1921–1970)
- Children: Staughton Lynd; Andrea Merrell Lynd Nold
- Parent(s): Mabel (Waite) and Edward Tracy Merrell (newspaper publisher)
- Relatives: Margaret Merrell (sister)

Helen Merrell Lynd (March 17, 1896 – January 30, 1982) was an American sociologist, social philosopher, educator, and author. She is best known for conducting the first Middletown studies of Muncie, Indiana, with her husband, Robert Staughton Lynd; as the coauthor of Middletown: A Study in Contemporary American Culture (1929) and Middletown in Transition: A Study in Cultural Conflicts (1937); and a pioneer in the use of social surveys. She was also the author of England in the 1880s: Toward a Social Basis for Freedom (1945), On Shame and the Search for Identity (1958), and essays on academic freedom. In addition to writing and research, Lynd was a lecturer at Vassar College, and a professor at Sarah Lawrence College from 1929 to 1964.

== Early life and education ==
Helen Merrell was born in La Grange, Illinois, on March 17, 1896. Merrill studied philosophy at Wellesley College, graduating with a bachelor's degree in 1919. She began teaching at a New York City boarding school, but left the position after two years to begin graduate studies at Columbia University. Merrell earned a master's degree from Columbia University in the History of Ideas in 1922 and a Ph.D. degree in history and philosophy from Columbia in 1944.

== Marriage and family ==
Helen Merrell met Robert Staughton Lynd while hiking Mount Washington in New Hampshire. They married in 1921. Robert Lynd died on November 1, 1970.

The couple had two children, a son, Staughton Lynd, who became a historian and social activist, and a daughter, Andrea Merrell (Lynd) Nold.

== Career ==
Helen Merrell began her career as an educator in New York City, but after her marriage to Robert Lynd and earning a master's degree from Columbia University, she became a sociologist, author, and college professor.

=== First Middletown study ===
In 1924, Helen and Robert Lynd moved to Muncie, Indiana, to begin an eighteen-month study of daily life in this small, Midwestern community. John D. Rockefeller Jr. funded the research as part of the Institute for Social and Religious Research's Small City Study. The Lynds and their three-person staff primarily observed the social lives of the city's inhabitants. The study compared life in Muncie in 1890 to Muncie in 1924, with the goal of measuring the impact of the Industrial Revolution on American life. The Lynds provided details of their observations and analysis of their findings in Middletown: A Study in Contemporary American Culture (1929), which they coauthored. It was the first sociological study of an American community and became a classic work in the field.

Reviewers praised Middletown's "careful research and is scientific character," but its popularity was due to the authors' detailed descriptions of American life. However, because of the study's primary focus on Muncie's Protestant, white community, the book also received strong criticism for its failure to include details of other racial and ethnic segments of the community. Despite the negative comments the book received positive reviews in The New York Times and New York Herald Tribune. The book's success also launched the Lynds' academic careers. Helen and Robert Lynd coauthored Middletown in Transition (1937), a sequel to their first book on Muncie that became another sociological classic, but plans for a third Middletown book did not develop. Instead, the Lynds turned to other scholarly interests.

=== Professor, author, and essayist ===
Helen Lynd became a lecturer at Vassar College in Poughkeepsie, New York, and from 1929 to 1964, a faculty member at Sarah Lawrence College in Bronxville, New York. She also continued to author books, such as England in the 1880s: Toward a Social Basis for Freedom (1945) and On Shame and the Search for Identity (1958), in addition to writing articles on academic freedom.

The model of shame that Lynd advocated in her book, On Shame and the Search for Identity (1958), is loosely Marxian, insisting upon "the importance of historical context and of transcultural analysis within single social formations" (particularly Western). Her theory of shame hinges upon the clashing of different social or moral 'values' in specific locations at specific moments, highlighting the trauma experienced by members of communities marginal to dominant culture: those most likely to feel shame are those made to feel 'inappropriate' by dominant cultural norms."

During the era of McCarthyism in the late 1940s and early 1950s, Helen and Robert Lynd were the subjects of federal investigations for alleged involvement in the Communist party. Helen Lynd testified before the U.S. Congress in 1953.

== Death and legacy ==
Helen Lynd died on January 30, 1982, in Warren, Ohio, at the age of eighty-five.

Helen and Robert Lynd's legacy stems from their Middletown studies and detailed descriptions of small-town life in Muncie, Indiana, the first systematic sociological study of a community in the United States. The Lynds were pioneers in the use of social surveys in their research.

Helen and Robert Lynd coauthored two books that became classics of American sociology: Middletown: A Study in Contemporary American Culture (1929) and Middletown in Transition (1937). Robert B. Downs included Middletown as one of the twenty-five he listed in Books That Changed America (1970).

Helen and Robert Lynds' pioneering work also began an on-going tradition of studying Muncie, Indiana, including the establishment of the Center for Middletown Studies in 1980. (The Center became affiliated with Ball State University in 1984.) Beginning with Frederick Lewis Allen in the 1930s, scholars have followed the Lynds pioneering efforts by producing numerous articles and books. More recent Middletown studies continue to examine modern life in Muncie with the hope that research on this particular Indiana community will provide a "better understanding of modern American life." Later Middletown studies have resulted in the publication of additional books, including Middletown Families (1982) and All Faithful People (1983), and films, such as the six-part documentary, Middletown, which aired on PBS in 1982, and The First Measured Century, first broadcast on PBS in 2000.

== Selected published works ==
- Middletown: A Study in Contemporary American Culture (New York: Harcourt, Brace, 1929), co-authored with Robert Staughton Lynd
- Middletown in Transition: A Study in Cultural Conflicts (New York: Harcourt, Brace, 1937), co-authored with Robert Staughton Lynd
- England in the 1880s: Toward a Social Basis for Freedom (New York: Oxford University Press, 1945)
- On Shame and the Search for Identity (New York: Harcourt, Brace, 1958)
- Toward Discovery (Bronxville, New York: Sarah Lawrence College, 1965)

== See also ==
- American philosophy
- List of American philosophers
