= Jeff Mackler =

Socialist American activist & politician

- Occupation: Writer
- Known for: National secretary of Socialist Action

Jeffrey Mackler is an American activist from San Francisco, California. Mackler is the national secretary of Socialist Action, a Trotskyist political party. He was the nominee of Socialist Action for U.S. Senate from California in 2006, and President of the United States in 2016. His candidacy was endorsed by the Freedom Socialist Party. In both cases, Mackler was a write-in candidate. In 2019, Jeff Mackler was declared the presidential nominee for Socialist Action in the 2020 presidential election.

Mackler founded Northern California Climate Mobilization, is a longtime teacher and union activist with the American Federation of Teachers in Hayward, California and is director of the Mobilization to Free Mumia Abu-Jamal. He is an alumnus of Antioch College.

== Political positions ==
=== Economy ===
Mackler supports the abolition of capitalism and has at various times supported a 100% tax rate on all incomes above either $150,000 or $200,000. He supports temporary rise to a $15 minimum wage and a massively expanded role for unions.

=== Environment ===
Mackler supports a transition to power the United States with 100% renewable energy, and "guaranteed jobs at top union wages" for all people who would lose jobs as a part of a theoretical transition.

=== Military ===
Mackler is in favor of a total elimination of the United States military.

=== Health care and education ===
Mackler has expressed support for the American government to provide free public health care and education, including the abolition of private insurance. He has expressed a belief that Medicare for all in his view does not go far enough.

=== Immigration ===
Mackler supports abolition of borders and "amnesty, legalisation and equal rights for all immigrants".
