= Solidarity (United States) =

U. S. socialist organization

- Founded: 1986; 40 years ago
- Merger of: International Socialists; Workers Power; Socialist Unity
- Headquarters: 7012 Michigan Ave, Detroit, MI 48210
- Ideology: Revolutionary socialism Socialist feminism Political pluralism Factions: Trotskyism; Left Shachtmanism; Luxemburgism
- Political position: Far-left
- International affiliation: Fourth International

Website
- solidarity-us.org

Solidarity is a revolutionary multi-tendency socialist organization in the United States, associated with the journal Against the Current. Solidarity is an organizational descendant of the International Socialists, a Third Camp Marxist organization which argued that the Soviet Union was not a "degenerated workers' state" (as orthodox Trotskyists argue) but rather "bureaucratic collectivism," a new and especially repressive class society.

Solidarity describes itself as "a democratic, revolutionary socialist, feminist, anti-racist organization." Its roots are in strains of the Trotskyist tradition but has departed from many aspects of traditional Leninism and Trotskyism. It is more loosely organized than most "democratic centralist" groups, and it does not see itself as the vanguard of the working class or the nucleus of a vanguard. It was formed in 1986 from a fusion of the International Socialists, Workers Power, and Socialist Unity. The former two groups had recently been reunited in a single organization, while the last was an expelled fragment of the Socialist Workers Party (SWP). Solidarity's name was originally in part an homage to Solidarność — an independent labor union in Communist Poland which, in Solidarity's view, had challenged the Soviet Union from the left. Solidarity became a formal section of the Fourth International in 2025, having previously been a sympathizing organization.

== History ==
From the beginning, Solidarity was an avowedly pluralist radical organization that included several currents of Trotskyism, socialist-feminists who had been in the New American Movement, and veterans of earlier New Left groups such as Students for a Democratic Society. Solidarity sought to "regroup" with others to create a larger revolutionary socialist-feminist organization. They hoped to initiate a broad regroupment that would include, for example, some of the fragments of the disintegrating New Communist Movement and many more socialist-feminists and New Left veterans. Discussions of regroupment and "Left Refoundation" have been initiated between Solidarity and other left groups of varying tendencies from the 1980s to the present, but these have not led to broader fusions.

Smaller-scale regroupments have occurred, however. During the 1990s, two organizations fused with Solidarity—the Fourth Internationalist Tendency (a group expelled from the SWP) and Activists for Independent Socialist Politics (a Socialist Action split that had previously worked in Committees of Correspondence). In 2002, members of the Trotskyist League joined Solidarity.

== Strategy ==
Solidarity members often work in various unions for shop-floor militancy and rank-and-file democracy, and some have played key roles in maintaining and providing staff for Labor Notes magazine and Teamsters for a Democratic Union. Solidarity members have worked in many other mass movements in the US, including the anti-apartheid, reproductive rights, LGBTQ, Central American solidarity, Free Mumia Abu-Jamal, anti-war, and Global Justice movements, as well as the Green Party and the 1990s attempt at building a mass Labor Party. Solidarity members were deeply involved in Occupy Wall Street and Occupy in other cities since the Fall of 2011.

Solidarity prides itself on a "non-sectarian" approach to building these movements, and traditionally has prioritized the movements over building itself: "Too often socialist groups have seen the development of a movement not for what it is and can become, but only what it might offer in the way of recruits. We reject this conception and affirm the need for an effective class movement in and for itself, which requires new forms of action, thinking and dialogue rather than repeating the known formulas" (Regroupment & Refoundation of a U.S. Left). Solidarity publishes a bi-monthly Marxist journal, Against the Current, which is produced by an editorial board including Solidarity members and independent socialists.

In the 2010 midterm elections, Dan La Botz, a member of Solidarity and a co-editor of New Politics, ran for the United States Senate under the banner of the Socialist Party of Ohio and received 26,454 votes, or 0.69% of the total vote.

== Presidential endorsements ==
In 2000, Solidarity endorsed both the Green Party's Ralph Nader and the Socialist Party USA's David McReynolds for President. In August 2004, Solidarity again endorsed the now independent candidacy of Ralph Nader. In 2008, the organization endorsed Cynthia McKinney of the Green Party for President. In 2012, Solidarity urged its members to vote for the nominees of either the Green Party, Peace and Freedom, or Socialist Party USA. For 2016, the organization again endorsed Jill Stein of the Green Party for President.

In the 2020 presidential election, Solidarity initially endorsed the campaign of Howie Hawkins in November 2019, who was running as the candidate for the Socialist Party and the Green Party. The organization later decided in August 2020, after a poll of its members, to take no official position regarding the presidential election.

Year	President	Vice President	Votes	Endorsed Party
2000	Ralph Nader	Winona LaDuke	2,882,955	Green Party US
2000	David McReynolds	Mary Cal Hollis	5,602	Socialist Party USA
2004	Ralph Nader	Peter Camejo	465,650	Independent
2008	Cynthia McKinney	Rosa Clemente	161,797	Green Party US
2012	Jill Stein	Cheri Honkala	469,627	Green Party US
2012	Roseanne Barr	Cindy Sheehan	67,326	Peace and Freedom
2012	Stewart Alexander	Alex Mendoza	4,430	Socialist Party USA
2016	Jill Stein	Ajamu Baraka	1,457,218	Green Party US
2020	No official position		N/A	N/A

== Notable members ==
- Theresa El-Amin, political activist
- Howie Hawkins, political and labor union activist associated with the Green Party
- Dan La Botz, labor union activist, academic, journalist, and author
- Kim Moody, academic, journalist, and author
- Paul Le Blanc, historian
