= Felice Jarecky Louria =

American activist (1900–1988)

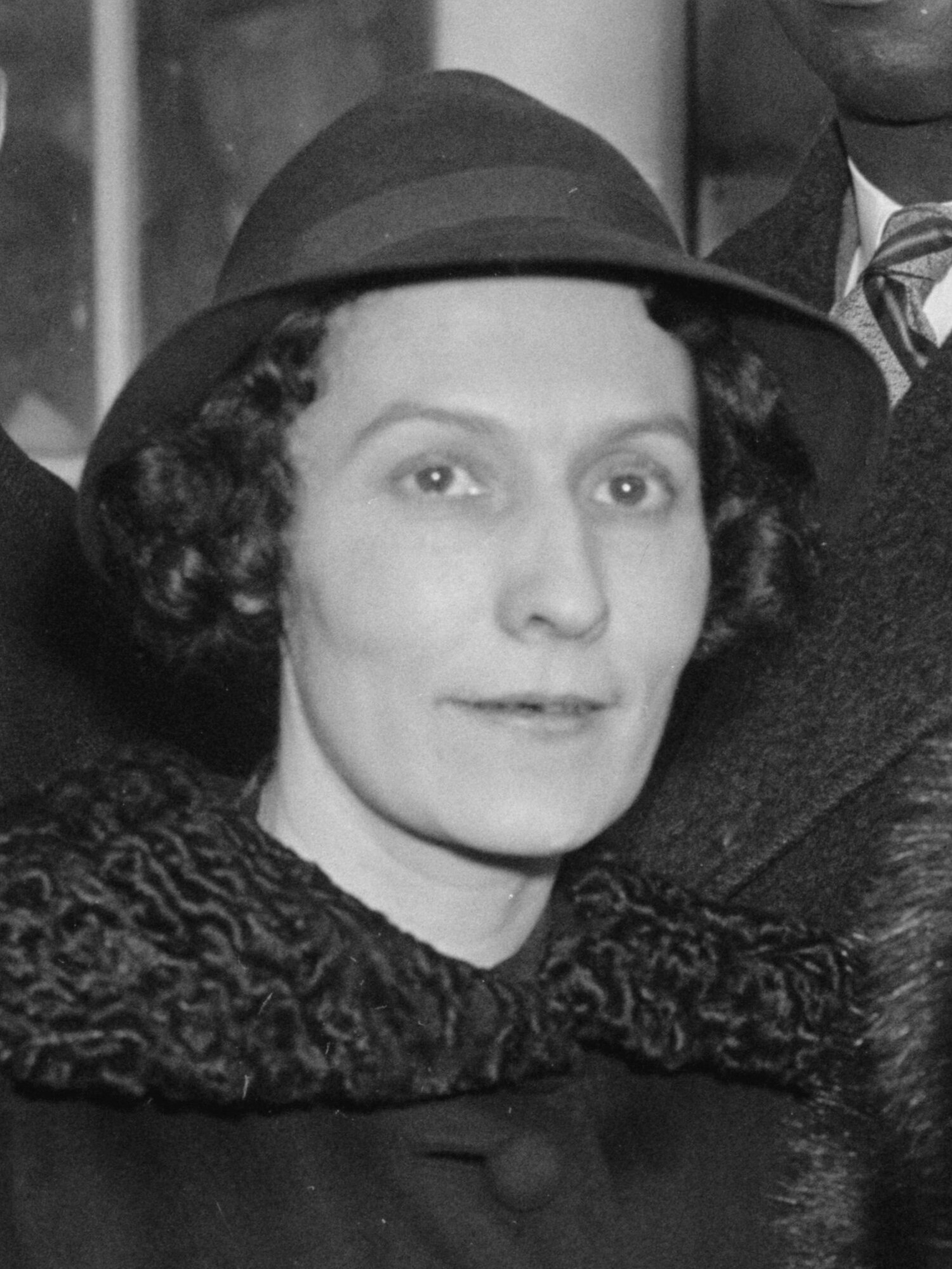
- Louria in 1938
- Born: Felice Helen Jarecky; July 7, 1900; Brooklyn, New York, U.S.
- Died: September 26, 1988 (aged 88); Santa Ana, California, U.S.
- Known for: Activist, state official

Felice Jarecky Louria (July 7, 1900 – September 26, 1988) was an American labor and human rights activist and a New York state official.

== Early life ==
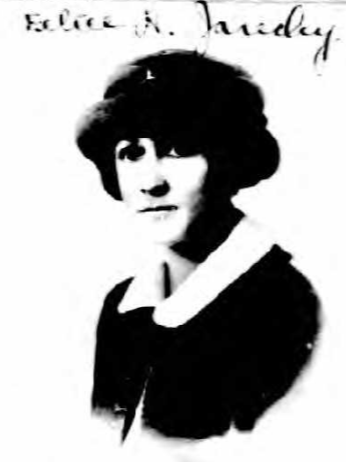
Jarecky's 1924 passport photograph

Felice Helen Jarecky was born in Brooklyn, New York, the daughter of Herman Jarecky and Lillian Amster Jarecky. Her father was a doctor. As a teenager she had a poem published in St. Nicholas magazine. She graduated from the Horace Mann School, and from Barnard College in 1920.

== Career ==
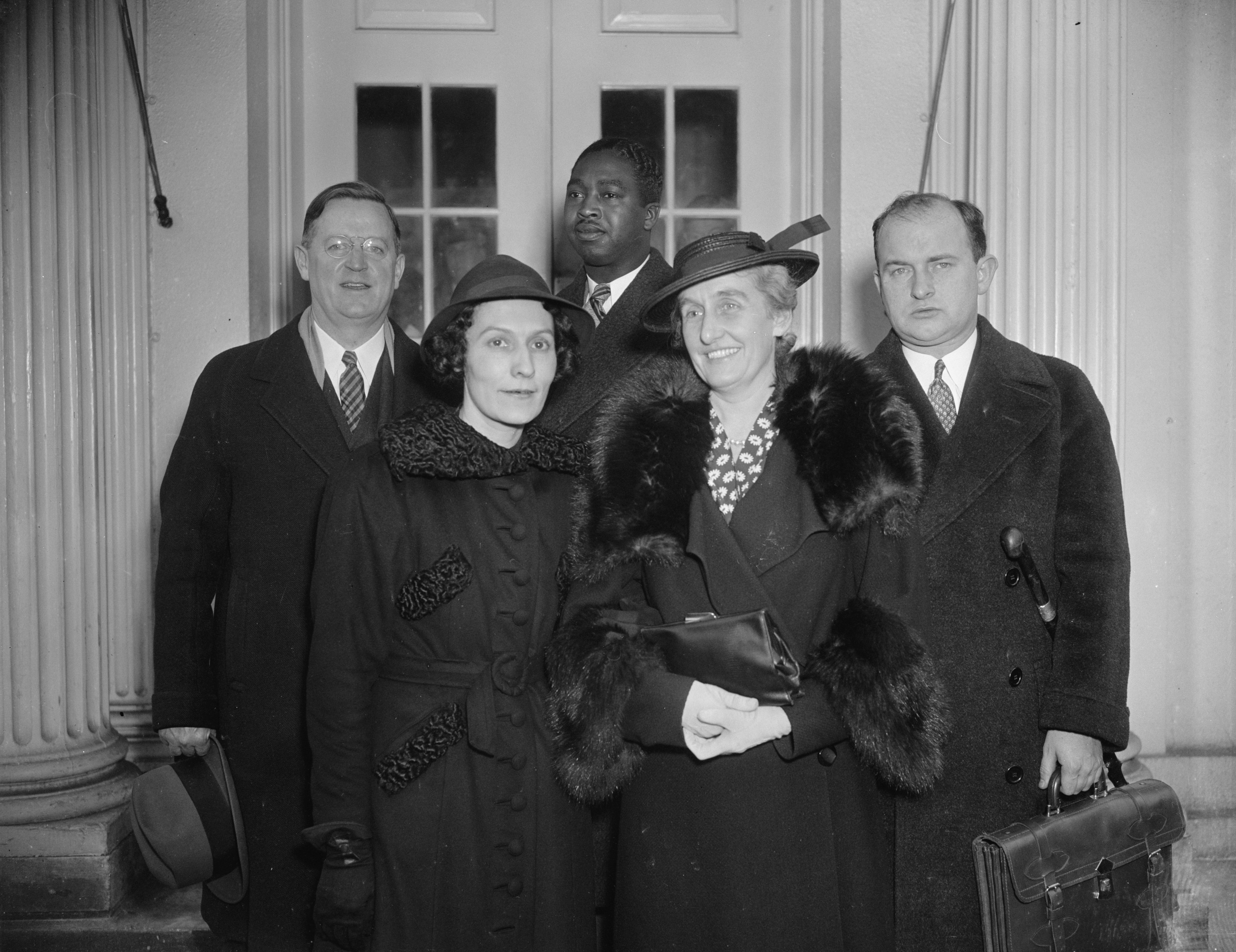
On February 24, 1938, a delegation from the Consumers National Federation submitted to President Roosevelt a four-point program seeking establishment of a Central Consumers' Agency in the federal government. Front row (L-R): Felice Louria and Helen Hall. Back row: Robert S. Lynd, B.F. McLaurin, and Michael Quill.

Louria worked in the New York State Department of Labor, as chief of the Bureau of Enforcement for the Division of Women in Industry and Child Labor. In 1936, she co-chaired American Labor Party activities in Brooklyn. She was executive secretary of the Consumers League of New York in 1937. In 1937, she served on the executive committee of the National Consumers Federation. She was part of a delegation from the Federation to the White House in 1938, to present a proposal for establishing a national consumers' agency as part of the federal government. In 1946, she was active in the International Labor Organization. She served on the Citizen's Commission on the City Economy in New York City in the early 1960s.

Louria was a national field representative for Women in Community Service (WICS) in the mid-1960s, and spoke in cities across the country about Job Corps, saying "Good intentions are not enough, our programs must have a practical approach to be effective."

Louria moved to California in 1966, and organized a Job Corps training center in Orange County. She was also head of the Orange County Interfaith Committee to Aid Farm Workers, and promoted the United Farm Workers' boycotts of grapes and lettuce. She also co-chaired the Housing Coalition of Orange County. She received a humanitarian award in 1988 from the Orange County Human Relations Commission.

Louria was also affiliated at various times with the Henry Street Settlement, the New School for Social Research, the ACLU, Common Cause, Women For Democratic Action, and the National Council of Jewish Women.

== Personal life ==
In 1925, Felice Jarecky married surgeon Herman (Henry) Walter Louria, in a ceremony performed by rabbi Stephen Samuel Wise. They had three children, Henry, Margot, and Ellin. They divorced in 1977. She died in 1988, aged 88 years, in Santa Ana, California.
