= Sy Landy =

Sy Landy (7 May 1931 – 28 November 2007) was an American Trotskyist politician.

Born in Brooklyn, Landy studied at Brooklyn College, where he joined the third camp Trotskyist Independent Socialist League (ISL), led by Max Shachtman. The ISL moved away from revolutionary politics and merged with Norman Thomas' Socialist Party in 1958. Shachtman and many of the "Shachtmanites" moved rapidly to the right. Landy was a prominent supporter of Hal Draper's left opposition to Shachtman's support for the Bay of Pigs invasion, joined Draper in splitting from the Socialist Party in the early 1960s. During this period, he also became a member of the board of New Politics.

Draper founded the Independent Socialist Club (with the old "third camp" socialist politics), and Landy established the group in New York, initially one of its three main centres. In 1969, it became the International Socialists (IS), and Landy retained a leadership role, but he became increasingly interested in the ideas of black power and the ideals of the French uprising of May 1968. Within the IS, he became a leader of the opposition "Revolutionary Tendency". This split in 1973 to form the Revolutionary Socialist League. Although he was elected to the Central Committee of the new organisation, in 1975 he opened a debate over what he believed was an increasing stagist tendency, and the organisation's refusal to call for a global general strike under then current circumstances. He was soon expelled from the organisation alongside Walter Daum, and the two's supporters, who had formed the "Revolutionary Party Tendency", soon joined them in founding the League for the Revolutionary Party (LRP).

Sy Landy remained the National Secretary of the LRP until his death, occasionally working as a teacher in Jersey City. In 1992, he worked with two other organisations to found the international Communist Organization for the Fourth International.
