= Frank Lovell =

American politician

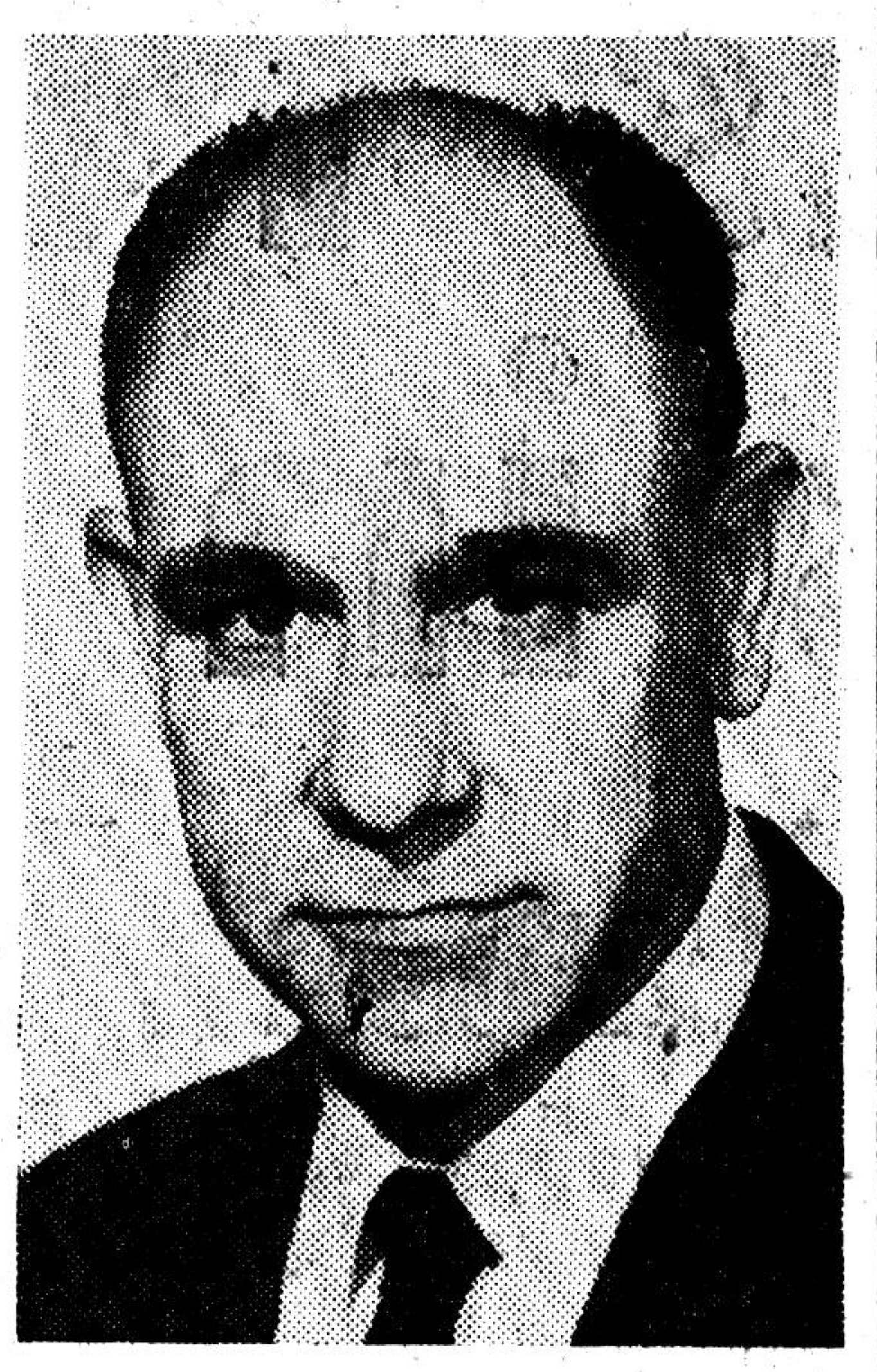

Frank Lovell (July 24, 1913 – May 1, 1998) was an American communist politician.

Lovell was born in Ipava, a town situated in the farming district of Illinois. Lovell studied psychology at the University of California, Berkeley. After he had left the campus, Lovell earned his living as a seaman, chiefly on the West Coast of the United States.

In the 1930s, Lovell came into contact with Trotskyist movement led by James P. Cannon and he became one of the first members of the Socialist Workers Party, and in 1942 he was elected to its National Committee.

As a seaman, Lovell was active in the Sailors Union of the Pacific and the leader of many strikes. In 1943, during World War II, serving in the U.S. merchant marine, Lovell barely survived the blow up of his ship by a German mine off the coast of Iceland as the ship came off the Murmansk run.

In the 1950s, Lovell was one of the SWP's prominent members who had to move to Detroit the rebuild the party's branch there after the SWP had had to expel a lot of members part of the Bert Cochran faction group. Lovell ran for Governor of Michigan on the SWP ticket in 1954, 1958 and 1964, and as candidate for Mayor of Detroit in 1953 amidst an atmosphere of McCarthyism.

In the early 1980s, Lovell, and several other members of the SWP, got into a sharp conflict with the new, younger party leadership under Jack Barnes. Eventually, Lovell and many other members of the party were expelled; some of these, Lovell included, went on to establish the Fourth Internationalist Tendency.

On May 1, 1998, at the age of 84, Lovell died of a heart attack in his Manhattan apartment.
