= Workers Power (United States) =

Trotskyist faction

Workers Power was a short lived Trotskyist faction in the late 1970s and early 1980s.

In the 1970s the Third Camp group International Socialists carried out its most successful work within organized labor within the International Brotherhood of Teamsters, helping to organize rank-and-file opposition to corruption and misspending of union finances by the leadership. Among the people they recruited in this drive was Pete Camarata who became the IS's principal figure within the union. However by the late 1970s Camarata split with the IS claiming that they were too willing to compromise during the intra-union struggles. Workers Power published a periodical called Against the Current which argued that the disparate tendencies of the revolutionary left should unify despite their political differences. Workers Power re-merged with the International Socialists in March 1985, during the series of mergers that culminated in creating Solidarity.
