= Love and Rage (organization) =

North American anarchist organization

- Love and Rage Revolutionary Anarchist Federation
- Formation: 1993; 33 years ago
- Dissolved: 1998; 28 years ago

Love and Rage Revolutionary Anarchist Federation was an anarchist organization active in North America from 1993 to 1998. Their politics emphasized intersectional anarchist communism across multiple currents including anti-racism, anti-capitalism, and feminism. Love and Rage was influential for other American grassroots social movements in the 1990s.

== History and ideology ==
Following the 1986 centennial of the Haymarket affair, anarchists began hosting annual gatherings across North America. In 1989, this group formed an anarchist newspaper, Love and Rage, that became an informal network and, in 1993, an anarchist federation (Love and Rage Revolutionary Anarchist Federation) with membership. With chapters across the United States, Canada, and Mexico, it was the region's most prominent revolutionary anarchist group of the period. Love and Rage's major chapters were in New York City, Minneapolis, and Mexico City. At its peak, it had around 200 members, with a smaller group was responsible for its core activity.

The group sought to re-establish revolutionary anarchism for the 21st century as intersectional anarchist communism based in coherent strategy and organizations. This contrasted the main anarchist publications, which were anti-organizations and individualist in nature. Love and Rage sought a sought to establish a prefigurative "dual power" in which anarchists build grassroots, non-hierarchical institutions in parallel to traditional power structures to one day undo state and capitalist power structures.

Love and Rage's politics were based in anarchist modifications to the 1960s white anti-imperialist movements. Their newspaper opened each issue with a statement in support of replacing authoritarian social relations with cooperation, solidarity, and mutual aid. They support queer and youth liberation, anti-fascism, and feminism. They oppose the state, capitalism, imperialism, patriarchy, and white supremacy. Love and Rage supported national liberation movements, unlike other anti-statist organizations. The group's members, who were mostly white, also sought to abolish whiteness and undo white privilege.

In 1994, Love and Rage established three working groups: anti-fascism, anti-prisons, and Zapatista movement solidarity.

The Love and Rage newspaper printed 10,000 copies bimonthly.

Love and Rage was one of several social anarchist organizations in its era, alongside Anti-Racist Action and the Black Autonomy Federation. Many Love and Rage members came from the Revolutionary Socialist League, another anarchist organization that had turned from Trotskyism in the 1980s.

Sectarianism over the anarchist tradition led to the group's dissolution in 1998.

== Legacy ==
Love and Rage was the most prominent American anarchist organization of its time. Its level of strategic organization and reach of its newspaper gave it considerable influence among its American social movement contemporaries, including the Anti-Racist Action and the 1990s feminist movements. The group and other revolutionary social anarchist organizations contributed to the re-establishment of the American left with intersectional politics across multiple traditions (anti-racism, anti-capitalism, anti-state, and feminist).

The phrase "Love and Rage", popularized by the group, also had an undercurrent in the American punk rock band lyrics of Mischief Brew and Green Day.

== Bibliography ==
- Beswick, Spencer (Autumn 2022). "From the Ashes of the Old: Anarchism Reborn in a Counterrevolutionary Age (1970s-1990s)". Anarchist Studies. 30 (2): 31–54. doi:10.3898/AS.30.2.02.
- Beswick, Spencer (2024). "'To Repulse the State from Our Uteri': Anarcha-feminism, Reproductive Freedom, and Dual Power". Radical History Review. 2024 (148): 90–106. doi:10.1215/01636545-10846837. ISSN 0163-6545.
- Graham, Robert (July 2005). "Rev. of Anarchy in the Age of Dinosaurs and A New World in Our Hearts". Social Anarchism (38): 76. Archived from the original on March 10, 2007.
- Scher, Abby (April 3, 1999). "Anarchism Faces the '90s". Dollars & Sense (222): 30. ISSN 0012-5245. EBSCOhost 1601671.
- Wood, Lesley (August 2019). "Anarchist Gatherings 1986–2017". ACME: An International Journal for Critical Geographies. 18 (4): 892–908. ISSN 1492-9732. EBSCOhost 138948772.
