= Labor Law for the Rank and Filer =

1978 guidebook on labor organizing

- Author: Staughton Lynd and Daniel Gross
- Publication date: 2008

Labor Law for the Rank and Filer: Building Solidarity While Staying Clear of the Law is a 1978 guidebook on labor organizing written by labor historian Staughton Lynd and organizer Daniel Gross.
