= Stan Weir (academic) =

American blue-collar intellectual, socialist activist, and labor leader

Stan Weir (1921–2001) was an influential blue-collar intellectual, socialist, and labor leader. A rank-and-file worker for most of his life, Weir worked as a seaman in the Merchant Marine during World War II, as an auto worker, longshoreman, truck driver, and painter, before taking a position at the University of Illinois, where he taught courses to union locals.

Politically, he was a leading figure in the "Third Camp" tendency of Trotskyism, and was a member of the Workers Party and its successor the Independent Socialist League. The character Joe Link in Harvey Swados’s novel Standing Fast was based on Weir.

In the 1980s he co-founded Singlejack Books, a publishing house for worker writers. A close friend to James Baldwin, Staughton Lynd and C.L.R. James, Weir was at the forefront of much of the labor movement during the second half of the twentieth century.
