= Staughton Lynd =

American activist and lawyer (1929–2022)

- Born: November 22, 1929; Philadelphia, Pennsylvania, U.S.
- Died: November 17, 2022 (aged 92); Warren, Ohio, U.S.
- Education: Harvard University (BA); Columbia University (MA, PhD); University of Chicago (JD)
- Occupations: Activist; lawyer; historian
- Spouse: Alice Niles (m. 1951)
- Children: 3
- Parents: Helen Merrell Lynd; Robert Staughton Lynd

Staughton Craig Lynd (November 22, 1929 – November 17, 2022) was an American political activist, author, and lawyer. His involvement in social justice causes brought him into contact with some of the nation's most influential activists, including Howard Zinn, Tom Hayden, A. J. Muste, and David Dellinger.

Lynd's contribution to the cause of social justice and the peace movement is chronicled in Carl Mirra's biography, The Admirable Radical: Staughton Lynd and Cold War Dissent, 1945–1970 (2010).

== Background ==
Lynd was one of two children born to the renowned sociologists Robert Staughton Lynd and Helen Merrell Lynd, who authored the groundbreaking "Middletown" studies of Muncie, Indiana, in the late 1920s and 1930s. Though the family lived in New York City, his mother elected to give birth at a hospital she preferred in Philadelphia. Lynd followed not only his parents' academic occupations, but also their strong left-wing beliefs. He was a conscientious objector who was assigned to a non-combatant position in the U.S. military, but amid the McCarthy Era, he was dishonorably discharged after it was found that he had briefly affiliated with communist groups while an undergraduate at Harvard College.

He went on to earn a doctorate in history at Columbia University and accepted a teaching position at Spelman College, in Georgia, where he worked closely with historian and civil rights activist Howard Zinn. When Zinn was fired from Spelman at the end of the 1962–63 academic year, Lynd protested. During the summer of 1964, Lynd served as director of the SNCC-organized Freedom Schools of Mississippi. After accepting a position at Yale University, Lynd relocated to New England. In 1965 he gave lectures on 'The History of the American Left' at the Free University of New York.

=== Personal life ===
Lynd married Alice Niles in 1951. They had three children and remained married until his death.

On November 17, 2022, Staughton Lynd died from multiple organ failure at a hospital in Warren, Ohio. It was five days before his 93rd birthday.

== Vietnam-era activism ==
At Yale, Lynd became an outspoken opponent of the Vietnam War. His protest activities included speaking engagements, protest marches, and a controversial visit to Hanoi along with Herbert Aptheker and Tom Hayden on a fact-finding trip in 1966, which made him unwelcome to the Yale administration. As the protest movement grew increasingly violent, Lynd began to have misgivings about the direction it was taking, and found himself estranged from the movement. As a self-described "social democratic pacifist" and "Marxist Existentialist Pacifist", he became interested in the possibilities of local grass-roots organizing. Lynd's New York Times obituary described his political influences as "drawing equal inspiration from Marxism, American abolitionism and Quaker pacifism".

In 1967, Lynd signed a letter declaring his intention to refuse to pay taxes in protest against the Vietnam War, and urging other people to also take this stand.

== Labor activism ==
In 1968, Lynd published Intellectual Origins of American Radicalism. Although the book was praised by David Donald in Commentary magazine as "a major work in American intellectual history", it came under severe criticism from then-Marxist professor Eugene Genovese, writing in the New York Review of Books. As a result of the negative review—combined with Lynd's controversial reputation as an anti-war activist who had traveled to North Vietnam with Tom Hayden—it was soon clear that Yale would deny Lynd tenure. After losing his post at Yale, he became unemployable in academia.

Lynd relocated his family to Chicago. There, he struggled to make a living from community organizing. In 1968, he accepted a job from Saul Alinsky as supervisor of the second phase of Alinsky's Industrial Areas Foundation (IAF) organizer training school. Sociologist and Professor of American Studies Clément Petitjean writes of Lynd:

Although he was highly critical of Alinsky's politics, he needed a job at the time... Lynd started teaching courses on US workers' history but also on contemporary forms of collective action to the dozen or so individuals.

While training an organizer in a field placement in Gary, Indiana, Lynd saw an opportunity to continue a campaign he had been working on "targeting the fact that US Steel, which had one of its biggest steel making sites in Indiana, paid almost no taxes... But Alinsky and the organizer Lynd was supervising had different plans. Instead, the trainee 'tried to organize around the existence of a pornographic bookstore in Indiana, just next to Gary.'" In May 1970, Lynd requested a leave of absence from IAF to return to his research in oral history; a year later, he left the training school. In a letter announcing his decision, he wrote: "[Saul and I] come out of quite different political and organizing backgrounds, and it is not surprising that sooner or later our paths would diverge."

Meanwhile, he and his wife Alice embarked upon an oral history project dealing with the working class. The conclusions of this work, titled Rank and File, inspired Lynd to study law in order to assist workers victimized by companies and left unprotected by bureaucratic labor unions. In 1973, he enrolled at the University of Chicago law school, where he earned a degree in 1976.

== Rust Belt activism ==
From there, the Lynds relocated to Youngstown, Ohio, in the heart of the Rust Belt. Working first for the union-side labor law firm of Green, Schiavoni, Murphy & Haines, and then for Northeast Ohio Legal Services in Youngstown, he proved to be a vital participant in the late 1970s struggle to keep the Youngstown steel mills open. He served as lead counsel for six local unions, several dozen individual steelworkers, and the Ecumenical Coalition of the Mahoning Valley which sought to reopen the mills under worker-community ownership. Despite the ultimate failure of those efforts, the Lynds continued organizing in the Youngstown-Warren area. Staughton remained extremely active as an attorney, taking on a broad range of cases, including those concerning "chemically disabled" auto workers and retired steelworkers.

His book Lucasville is an investigation into the events surrounding the 1993 prison uprising at Southern Ohio Correctional Facility, and voices serious concern over the integrity of legal proceedings subsequent to the event. A memoir of his and Alice's life, "Stepping Stones: Memoir of a Life Together," was released in January 2009.

== Works by Lynd ==
- Anti-Federalism in Dutchess County, New York: A Study of Democracy and Class Conflict in the Revolutionary Era (1962)
- The New Radicals and "Participatory Democracy". Chicago: Students for a Democratic Society, 1965. 10 p.

Reprinted from Dissent, Vol. 12, No. 3, July 1965.

- Ed. Nonviolence in America: A Documentary History (1966)
- Ed. Reconstruction (1967)
- With Tom Hayden, The Other Side (1967)
- Intellectual Origins of American Radicalism (1968)
- Class Conflict, Slavery, and the United States Constitution: Ten Essays (1968)
- With Michael Ferber, The Resistance (1971)
- Ed. Personal Histories of the Early C.I.O. (1971)
- With Gar Alperovitz, Strategy and Program: Two Essays Toward a New American Socialism (1973)
- Ed. American Labor Radicalism: Testimonies and Interpretations (1973)
- Ed. with Alice Lynd, Rank and File: Personal Histories by Working-Class Organizers (1973)
- With Helen Merrell Lynd, Possibilities (1977)
- Labor Law for the Rank & Filer (1978)
- The Fight Against Shutdowns: Youngstown's Steel Mill Closings (1982)
- Solidarity Unionism: Rebuilding the Labor Movement from Below (1992)
- Ed. with Alice Lynd, Homeland: Oral Histories of Palestine and Palestinians (1993)
- Ed. with Alice Lynd, Nonviolence in America: A Documentary History 2nd Ed. (1995)
- With Alice Lynd, Liberation Theology for Quakers (1996)
- Ed. "We Are All Leaders": The Alternative Unionism of the Early 1930s (1996)
- Living Inside Our Hope: A Steadfast Radical's Thoughts on Rebuilding the Movement (1997)
- With Alice Lynd, The New Rank and File (2000)
- Lucasville: The Untold Story of a Prison Uprising (2004)
- Napue Nightmares: Perjured Testimony in Trials Following the 1993 Lucasville, Ohio Prison Uprising (2008)
- With Daniel Gross, Labor Law for the Rank & Filer: Building Solidarity While Staying Clear of the Law 2nd Ed. (2008)
- With Andrej Grubačić, Wobblies & Zapatistas: Conversations on Anarchism, Marxism and Radical History (2008)
- Class Conflict, Slavery, and the United States Constitution: Ten Essays 2nd Ed. (2009)
- With Alice Lynd, Stepping Stones: Memoir of a Life Together (2009)
- Intellectual Origins of American Radicalism (Cambridge University Press) (2009)
- From Here to There: The Staughton Lynd Reader (2010)
- With Daniel Gross, Solidarity Unionism at Starbucks (2011)
- Ed. with Alice Lynd, Rank and File: Personal Histories by Working-Class Organizers (Expanded Edition, 2011)
- Accompanying: Pathways to Social Change (2013)
- Doing History from the Bottom Up: On E.P. Thompson, Howard Zinn, and Rebuilding the Labor Movement from Below (2014)
- Solidarity Unionism: Rebuilding the Labor Movement from Below (Second Edition, 2015)
- With Alice Lynd, Moral Injury and Nonviolent Resistance: Breaking the Cycle of Violence in the Military and Behind Bars (2017)
- With Alice Lynd, Nonviolence in America: A Documentary History (Third Edition, 2018)

== See also ==
- List of peace activists

== Sources ==
- Mirra, Carl (2010). The Admirable Radical: Staughton Lynd and Cold War Dissent. Kent, Ohio: Kent State University Press.
- Mirra, Carl (Spring 2006). "Radical Historians and the Liberal Establishment: Staughton Lynd's Life with History". Left History. 11 (1).
- Weber, Mark; Paschen, Stephen (2014). Side by Side: Alice and Staughton Lynd, the Ohio Years. Kent, Ohio: Kent State University Press.
- Scene Magazine, Cleveland, Ohio, May 23, 2002.
- "Ohio Attorney Search". Supreme Court of Ohio.
