= Middletown studies =

Sociological case studies

The Middletown studies were sociological case studies of the white residents of the city of Muncie in Indiana initially conducted by Robert Staughton Lynd and Helen Merrell Lynd, husband-and-wife sociologists. The Lynds' findings were detailed in Middletown: A Study in Modern American Culture, published in 1929, and Middletown in Transition: A Study in Cultural Conflicts, published in 1937. They wrote in their first book:

The city will be called Middletown. A community as small as thirty-odd thousand ... [in which] the field staff was enabled to concentrate on cultural change ... the interplay of a relatively constant ... American stock and its changing environment.

The word middletown was meant to suggest the average or typical American small city. While there are many places in the U.S. actually named Middletown, the Lynds were interested in an idealized conceptual American type, and concealed the identity of the city by referring to it by this term. Sometime after publication, however, the residents of Muncie began to guess that their town had been the subject of the book.

The Lynds and a group of researchers conducted an in-depth field research study of the white residents of a small American urban center to discover key cultural norms and better understand social change. The first study was conducted during the prosperous 1920s, beginning in January 1924, while the second was written, with far less fieldwork, late in the Great Depression in the United States.

== Overview of Middletown (1929) ==
Middletown: A Study in American Culture was primarily a look at changes in the white population of a typical American city between 1890 and 1925, a period of great economic change. The Lynds used the "approach of the cultural anthropologist" (see field research and social anthropology), existing documents, statistics, old newspapers, interviews, and surveys to accomplish this task. The stated goal of the study was to describe this small urban center as a unit which consists of "interwoven trends of behavior". Or put in more detail, "to present a dynamic, functional study of the contemporary life of this specific American community in the light of trends of changing behavior observable in it during the last thirty-five years." The book is written in an entirely descriptive tone, treating the white citizens of Middletown in much the same way as an anthropologist from an industrialized nation might describe a non-industrial culture.

Following anthropologist W. H. R. Rivers' classic Social Organization, the Lynds write that the study proceeded "under the assumption that all the things people do in this American city may be viewed as falling under one or another of the following six main-trunk activities:"

- "Getting a living"
- "Making a home"
- "Training the young"
- "Using leisure in various forms of play, art, and so on"
- "Engaging in religious practices"
- "Engaging in community activities"

=== Working ===
In the 1920s, the Lynds found a "division into the working class and business class that constitutes the outstanding cleavage in Middletown." They state:

The mere fact of being born upon one or the other side of the watershed roughly formed by these two groups is the most significant single cultural factor tending to influence what one does all day long throughout one's life; whom one marries; when one gets up in the morning; whether one belongs to the Holy Roller or Presbyterian church; or drives a Ford or a Buick ...

The study found that at least 70 percent of the population belonged to the working class. However, labor unions had been driven out of town because the city's elite saw them as anti-capitalist. Because of this, unemployment was seen among residents as an individual, not a social, problem.

The city government was run by the "business class", a conservative group of individuals in high-income professions. For example, this group threw its support behind Calvin Coolidge's administration.

=== Home and family ===
Eighty-six percent of the residents lived in at least a nuclear family arrangement. Because of innovations such as mortgages, even working-class families were able to own their own homes. Home ownership is considered the mark of a "respectable" family.

Compared to the 19th century, family sizes were smaller, divorce rates were up. However, women still, by and large, worked as housewives. Having children is considered a "moral obligation" of all couples. However, at the age of six, the socialization of these children is taken over by secondary institutions such as schools. Also, taboos against things such as dating have been reduced.

Families tend not to spend as much time together as before. Also, new technology such as supermarkets, refrigeration, and washing machines have contributed to a downswing in traditional skills such as cooking and food preservation.

=== Youth ===
Almost a third of all children at the time of the study planned to attend college. High school has become the hub of adolescent life, both social and otherwise. There has been a rise in vocational studies, strongly supported by the community. This is a major demographic shift from the 19th century, when few youth received any formal education.

While the community claims to value education, they tend to disdain academic learning. Teachers are tolerated but not welcomed into the civic life and governance of the city.

=== Leisure time ===
Although new technology has created more leisure time for all people, most of this new time is passed in "passive" (or nonconstructive) recreation.

The introduction of the radio and automobile were considered the largest changes to leisure time at the time of the study. Listening to radio shows and taking drives became the most popular leisure activities. Many working-class families formerly never strayed more than a few miles from town, but with the automobile, they were able to take vacations across the United States.

With the rise of these activities, interest in such institutions as book discussion groups (and reading in general), public lectures, and the fine arts is in sharp decline. The introduction of movies has created another "passive leisure activity", but the most popular films concentrate on adventure and romance, while more serious topics are less popular.

About two-thirds of Middletown families now own cars. Owning a car, and the prestige it brings, is considered so important that some working-class families are willing to bypass necessities such as food and clothing to keep up with payments. A person's car indicates their social status, and the most "popular" teens own cars, much to the chagrin of local community leaders (one local preacher referred to the automobile as a "house of prostitution on wheels").

Overall, due to this new technology, community and family ties are breaking down. Friendship between neighbors and church attendance are down. However, more structured community organizations, such as the Rotary Club, are growing.

=== Religious activities ===
Middletown contained 42 churches, representing 28 denominations. The community as a whole has a strong Protestant tendency. A person's denomination is indicative of one's social status: the Methodist church is considered the most prestigious in these terms.

However, strong religious beliefs (i.e., ideas about heaven and hell) are dying out. While the vast majority of citizens profess a belief in God, they are increasingly cynical about organized religion. Also, many of the clergy tend to be politically progressive, and as such, are not welcomed into the city's governance.

The more fundamentalist Christian churches tend to be more political and down-to-earth in their approach to life and in sermons. This is in contrast to the mainline Protestant denominations, which tend to be more aloof and other-worldly. Overall, the city is becoming more secular. Youth are less inclined to attend church, but more likely to be involved with the YMCA and YWCA.

=== Government and community ===
The city's "business class" – and therefore most powerful class – is entirely Republican. Voter turnout, however, is down (46 percent in 1924), even considering the recent passage of women's suffrage.

The main reason for this appears to be increased cynicism towards politics, and politicians in general (politicians are considered by many to be no better than crooks). Moreover, the more skilled legal minds in town tend to work in the private sector, not the public sector.

Despite the good economic environment, there is always a small group of homeless. These people are considered the responsibility of churches and organizations such as the Salvation Army – charity is generally frowned upon.

Newspapers serve as the main medium of communication in town, both the morning and evening editions. Due to recent innovations such as the Associated Press, the papers are able to carry more news. Also, journalism tends to be more "objective", in contrast with the highly partisan papers of a few decades earlier.

Overall the city is highly, but invisibly, segregated. Although the Ku Klux Klan was recently kicked out of town, whites and blacks still live separately. However, the largest divide consists of social class lines. Businessmen, in particular, are required to be highly conformist in their political and social views.

== Overview of Middletown in Transition (1937) ==
In 1935, the Lynds returned to Middletown to research the second book, Middletown in Transition: A Study in Cultural Conflicts. They saw the Great Depression as an opportunity to see how the social structure of the town changed.

While the researchers found that there were some social changes, residents tended to go back to the way they were once economic hardship had ended. For example, the "business class", traditionally Republican, grudgingly supported the presidency of Franklin D. Roosevelt and accepted the money the New Deal brought into town. However, once they felt the programs were not needed anymore, they withdrew their support.

The second study only used one-tenth of the number of researchers used in the first, and as a result, it is not considered as in-depth as the first one.

Also, the second study is not as neutral as the first. The authors openly attack the "business class" and cite theorists such as Thorstein Veblen. They criticize the consumerism displayed by the citizens. They end on a strongly negative note, fearing that a dictator such as Huey Long or Adolf Hitler could conceivably draw support from such a population.

== Implications ==
The Middletown study is often quoted as an example of the adage "nothing really changes". Despite being conducted in 1925, the description of American culture and attitudes has remained largely unchanged. For example, even today, many news agencies, when trying to figure out what the "average American" believes, visit Muncie, Indiana. Pollsters do as well – the city has, for the most part, successfully predicted the election of US presidents.

This view was only furthered by the results of the second study – if the Great Depression was unable to cause major changes in the town's social structure, the implication is that nothing will.

While a growing number of sociologists and social critics (i.e., Robert D. Putnam) complain of less community involvement, their detractors point directly to the Middletown study. The argument is this: in 1925, observers were worried that new inventions such as the radio were destroying community ties, that morality was on the decline, and that the very fabric of American democracy was in danger. Supporters of the studies thus argue that every generation simply "reinvents" new problems without realizing that their ancestors had the same unfounded worries.

The Lynds tried carefully to avoid any ideological biases in the first study, offering it as a neutral set of observations. However, others have drawn different conclusions from the study. To name just a few examples:

- Marxists point to the "business class" and its ideology as the reason why workers and labor unions have never gained power.
- Conservatives (including sociologists who followed the structural functionalism school) saw the study as a confirmation that a lack of change is good for society.
- Critics of American culture, such as H. L. Mencken and Sinclair Lewis, author of Babbitt, cited the Middletown studies as examples of the banality and shallowness of American life.

== Criticism ==
The Lynds did not study the African-American population of Middletown. They justified this because this group comprised only five percent of the total population, and they were interested only in the norms of the majority culture.

== Replications ==
The National Science Foundation funded a replication of the Lynds' original study in the late 1970s (known as Middletown III). The University of Minnesota Press published some of the results in two books: Middletown Families: Fifty Years of Change and Continuity (1982) and All Faithful People: Change and Continuity in Middletown's Religion (1983). A limited replication (known as Middletown IV) was done in 1999 for the PBS documentary The First Measured Century. Data from the Middletown III and IV replications is available from the Inter-university Consortium for Political and Social Research under study number 4604.

== See also ==
- Magic Town
