= Robert Staughton Lynd =

American sociologist

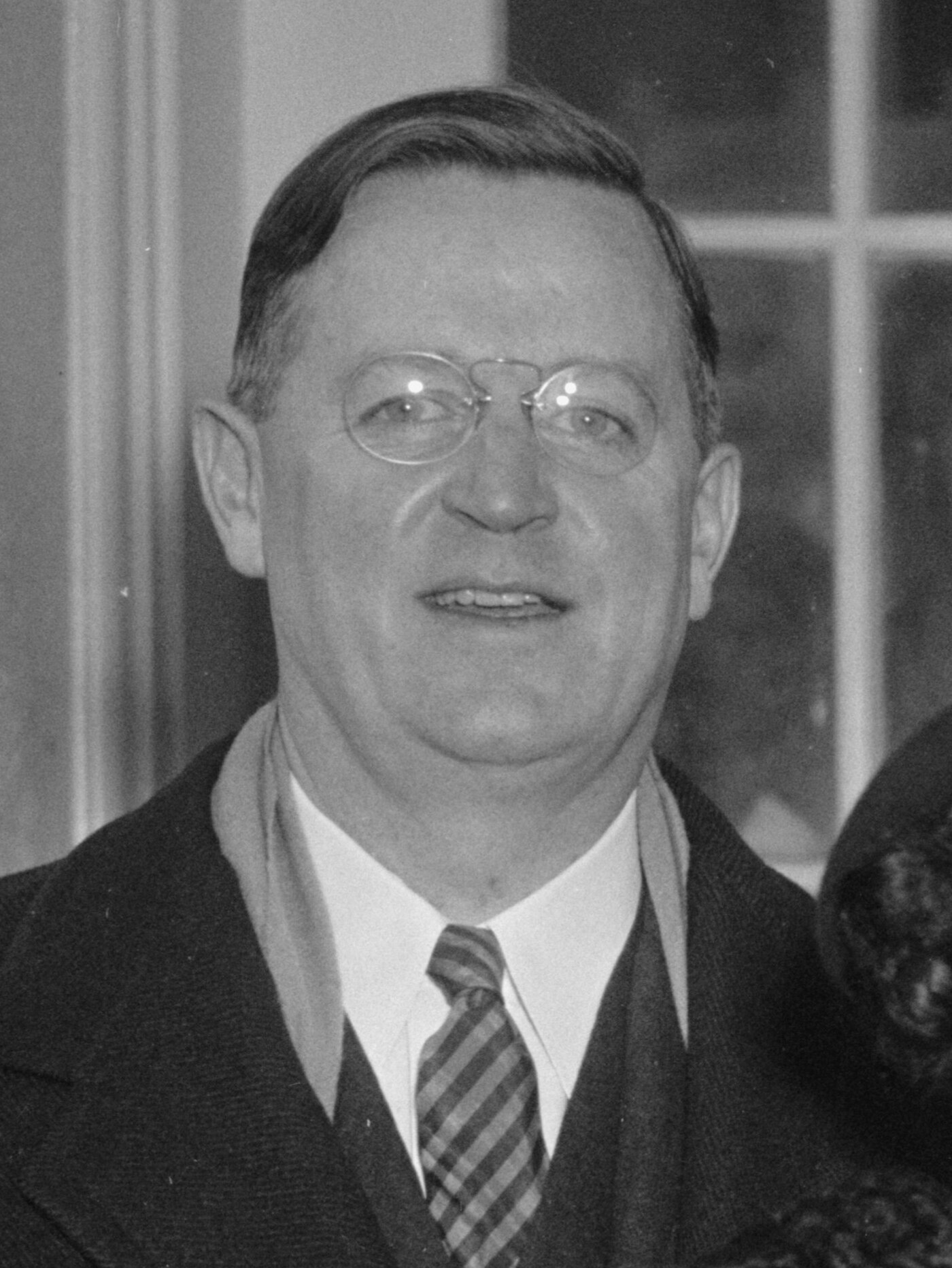
- Lynd in 1938
- Born: September 26, 1892; New Albany, Indiana
- Died: November 1, 1970 (aged 78); Warren, Connecticut
- Education: Princeton University, B.A., 1914; Union Theological Seminary (New York City), B.D., 1923; Columbia University, Ph.D., 1931
- Occupations: Sociologist and university professor
- Employer(s): Institute for Social and Religious Research, Rockefeller Foundation; Columbia University
- Notable work: Middletown (1929), co-author; Middletown in Transition, co-author; Knowledge for What?(1939), author
- Board member of: Consumers' Advisory Board of the National Recovery Administration
- Spouse: Helen Merrell Lynd (m. 1921–70)
- Children: Staughton Lynd; Andrea Merrell (Lynd) Nold
- Parent(s): Staughton and Cornelia Day Lynd

Robert Staughton Lynd (September 26, 1892 – November 1, 1970) was an American sociologist and professor at Columbia University, New York City. He is best known for conducting the first Middletown studies of Muncie, Indiana, with his wife, Helen Lynd; as the co-author of Middletown: A Study in Contemporary American Culture (1929) and Middletown in Transition: A Study in Cultural Conflicts (1937); and a pioneer in the use of social surveys. He was also the author of Knowledge for What? The Place of the Social Sciences in American Culture (1939). In addition to writing and research, Lynd taught at Columbia from 1931 to 1960. He also served on U.S. government committees and advisory boards, including President Herbert Hoover's Research Committee on Social Trends and President Franklin D. Roosevelt's Consumers' Advisory Board of the National Recovery Administration. Lynd was also a member of several scientific societies.

== Early life and education ==
Robert Staughton Lynd was born in New Albany, Indiana, on September 26, 1892, to Staughton and Cornelia Day Lynd. Robert Lynd received a Bachelor of Arts degree from Princeton University 1914. In the years 1919, 1920, 1921, and 1933 he attended classes at the New School for Social Research. From September 1920 to 1923 Lynd attended the Union Theological Seminary in New York City, where he was a student of Harry Emerson Fosdick, graduating with a Bachelor of Divinity degree in 1923. He also took a course at Columbia University with John Dewey, who influenced him with his ideas of collective experience and social learning. Lynd received a Ph.D. in sociology from Columbia in 1931 using an abridged version of Middletown as his dissertation.

== Marriage and family ==
Robert Lynd met Helen Merrell while hiking Mount Washington in New Hampshire. They married in 1921. Helen Lynd died on January 30, 1982.

The Lynds had two children, a son, Staughton Lynd, who became a lawyer, historian, and social justice activist, and a daughter, Andrea Merrell (Lynd) Nold.

== Career ==
=== Early years ===
In 1914 Lynd began working as an assistant editor at Publishers Weekly in New York City, before leaving in 1918 to serve in the U.S. Army Field Artillery during World War I. After the war Lynd was an advertising and publicity manager at Charles Scribner's Sons for about a year, then began work in 1920 as an assistant publisher for B. W. Huebsch, Inc. and joined the staff of the Freeman.

In 1921 Lynd was a divinity student at Union Theological Seminary, and for a summer he work as a church missionary in Elk Basin, Wyoming, the site of several oil camps. Afterwards Lynd wrote "Done in Oil," an exposé critical of the conditions in the camps. The essay and his community work brought Lynd to the attention of the Rockefeller family. (John D. Rockefeller Jr. tried unsuccessfully to block publication of the essay, but held no grudge against Lynd for writing it.) In 1923 Rockefeller agreed to let the Institute of Social and Religious Research hire Lynd as a director for its Small City Study. Lynd served as the director of the institute's study, which Rockefeller funded, from 1923 to 1926. Lynd's wife, Helen, joined the project that became better known as the Middletown studies as a coinvestigator.

=== First Middletown study ===
In 1924 Robert and Helen Lynd moved to Muncie, Indiana, to begin an eighteen-month study of daily life in this Midwestern community. The Lynds and their three-person staff primarily observed the social lives of the city's inhabitants. The study compared life in Muncie in 1890 to Muncie in 1924, with the goal of measuring the effects of the Industrial Revolution on American life. The Lynds co-authored Middletown: A Study in Contemporary American Culture (1929) describing the details of their research in Muncie. Following a functionalist approach, it was the first sociological study of an American community and a classic work in the field.

Middletown was an immediate success, receiving positive reviews in The New York Times and New York Herald Tribune, and launched the academic career of both Robert and Helen Lynd. Reviewers "praised its careful research and its scientific character," but the book's popularity was due to the co-authors' explanations of American life. Not all the reviews were positive. The book was strongly criticized for its failure to include a variety of racial and ethnic experiences. Instead, the Lynds focused on the city's white and predominantly Protestant community.

=== Researcher and professor ===
In 1926 Lynd became assistant director of the Division of Educational Research at the Commonwealth Fund, then joined the Social Science Research Council in 1927 as a research supervisor and assistant to the chairman. He spent another four years, 1928 to 1931, as the council's secretary.

In 1931 Lynd accepted a tenure-track position as Professor of Sociology at Columbia University, a position he held until 1960. While teaching at Columbia, Lynd began but never completed sociological studies concerning the impact that the Great Depression had on segments of the population in Manhattan, New York, and in Montclair, New Jersey.

=== Second Middletown study ===
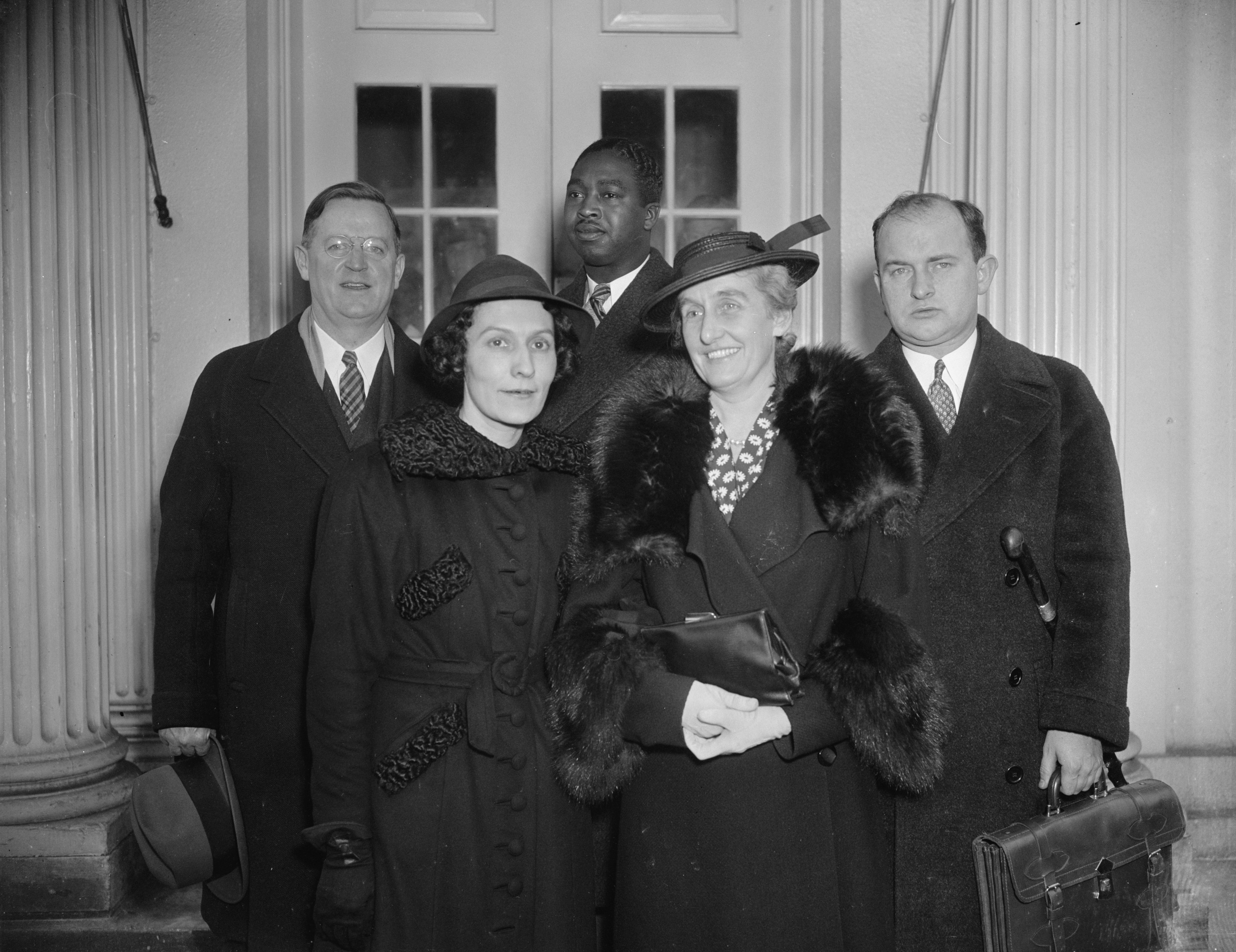
On February 24, 1938, a delegation from the Consumers National Federation submitted to President Roosevelt a four-point program seeking establishment of a Central Consumers' Agency in the federal government. Front row (L-R): Felice Louria and Helen Hall. Back row: Robert S. Lynd, B.F. McLaurin, and Michael Quill.

Lynd returned to Muncie, Indiana, during the summer of 1935 to make additional observations of the city and to update earlier research. After returning to New York, Robert and Helen Lynd co-authored Middletown in Transition (1937). The sequel to their earlier work was more theoretical and not as popular among readers as Middletown. The sequel concluded that the community's values and attitudes had not changed much since their earlier research. The tone of the second book was also more critical than the first. Although the Lynds considered a third volume on Middletown, their plans were never realized.

After the publication of two books on the Middletown studies, Lynd resumed his academic career as a social scientist and professor at Columbia University. He also resumed writing, which included Knowledge for What? The Place of Social Science in American Culture (1939).

In addition to teaching at the university, Lynd served on U.S. government committees and advisory boards, including President Herbert Hoover's Research Committee on Social Trends and President Franklin D. Roosevelt's Consumers' Advisory Board of the National Recovery Administration. Lynd became a member of the advisory board's executive committee in 1935. He was also a member of a number of scientific societies in the field of sociological anthropology and economics, such as the AAAS, the American Social Society, American Statistics Society, and American Economics Association.

== Suspected Communist affiliations ==
During the McCarthy era of the late 1940s and early 1950s, Robert and Helen Lynd were the subjects of U.S. government investigations for alleged involvement in the Communist party. Several individuals who were interviewed in 1942 in connection with Robert Lynd's initial case believed that his political views were "extremely liberal," but they did not believe that he was a party member; others identified him as a fellow traveler belonging to a number of Communist front organizations, or as being under the direction of the Communist Party USA. No firm conclusion is stated in the FBI file on Lynd, which is viewable online.

Bela Gold, Lynd's chief assistant in the second Middletown study, was also suspected of Communist affiliations.

== Later years ==
Lynd continued to write in his later years, including two published essays, "Power in the United States" (1956), and "Power in American Society as Resource and Problem" (1957). He retired from teaching at Columbia University in 1960.

== Death and legacy ==
Lynd died at Warren, Connecticut, on November 1, 1970, at the age of seventy-eight.

Robert and Helen Lynd are best known for their research and descriptions of small-town life during the groundbreaking "Middletown studies of Muncie, Indiana, the first systematical, sociological study of a community in the United States. The Lynds were also pioneers in the use of social surveys in their research. Their detailed observations were documented in two books they co-authored, Middletown: A Study in Contemporary American Culture (1929) and Middletown in Transition (1937). Both book became classics of American sociology.

The Lynds' pioneering sociological work began a legacy of continued studies of Muncie, including the establishment of the Center for Middletown Studies in 1980. (The Center became affiliated with Ball State University in 1984.) Beginning with Frederick Lewis Allen in the 1930s, scholars have followed the Lynds' efforts, producing "hundreds of books, articles, and films examining life in one small city in Indiana" with the hope that their studies provide a "better understanding of modern American life." Subsequent Middletown studies resulted in the publication of additional books, most notably Middletown Families (1982) and All Faithful People (1983). Other studies were filmed: the six-part documentary, Middletown, that aired on PBS in 1982, and The First Measured Century, first broadcast on PBS in 2000. A seventh part of Middletown, "Seventeen" (1982), was judged too controversial to broadcast, as it focused on the world of high school seniors, portraying changing mores, language and sexuality. It was later released on the independent circuit and widely praised.

== Lynd's thought ==
In Knowledge for What?, he argues that American culture holds outstanding and contradictory assumptions such as women being both "the finest of God's creatures" while also considered inferior to men in term of reasoning power.

== Selected published works ==
- "Crude Oil Religion" (Harpers, 1922)
- "Done in Oil" (Survey, 1922)
- Middletown: A Study in Contemporary American Culture (New York: Harcourt, Brace, 1929), co-authored with Helen Lynd
- "The Consumer Becomes a 'Problem'" (Annals of the American Academy of Political and Social Science, 1934)
- Middletown in Transition (New York: Harcourt, Brace, 1937), co-authored with Helen Lynd
- Knowledge for What? The Place of the Social Sciences in American Culture (Princeton, New Jersey: Princeton University Press, 1939)
- "Power in the United States" (The Nation, May 12, 1956)
- "Power in American Society as Resource and Problem" in Arthur W. Kornhauser, eds., Problems of Power in American Society (Detroit, Wayne State University Press, 1957)

== Sources ==
- "About the Center". Center for Middletown Studies, Ball State University. Archived from the original on 2018-05-25.
- Chira, Susan (February 1, 1982). "Helen M. Lynd Dies; Co-Author of 'Middletown'". The New York Times. New York, New York: B4.
- Gugin, Linda C.; St. Clair, James E., eds. (2015). Indiana's 200: The People Who Shaped the Hoosier State. Indianapolis: Indiana Historical Society Press. pp. 216–18. ISBN 978-0-87195-387-2.
- Hoover, Dwight W. (1990). Middletown Revisited. Ball State Monograph Series. Vol. 34. Muncie, Indiana: Ball State University. ISBN 0-937994-18-9.
- Lynd, Robert (May 1934). "The Consumer Becomes a 'Problem'". Annals of the American Academy of Political and Social Science. 173: 1–6. doi:10.1177/000271623417300102. JSTOR 1020201. S2CID 143513214.
- Lynd, Robert (September 1922). "Crude Oil Religion". Harpers. CXLV: 425–34.
- Lynd, Robert (November 1, 1922). "Done in Oil". Survey. XLIX: 136–46.
- Manuscript Division Staff (2014). Robert Staughton Lynd and Helen Merrell Lynd Papers. Washington, D.C.: Library of Congress.
- "Middletown Studies Collection and Digital Archives". Ball State University. Archived from the original on 2007-01-29.* "Robert and Helen Lynd". The First Measured Century. PBS.
- "Staughton Lynd Interview". The First Measured Century. PBS.
- "Subject: Robert S Lynd". FBI. Federal Bureau of Investigation. 1950.
- "Timeline: People, Robert and Helen Lynd". The First Measured Century. PBS.
- Whitman, Alden (November 3, 1970). "Robert S. Lynd, Co-Author of 'Middletown' Dies". The New York Times. New York, New York: 38.
