= Fred Eppsteiner =

Zen Buddhist teacher

Fred Eppsteiner (born March 27, 1945) is an American Zen Buddhist teacher, trained in both Zen and Tibetan lineages. Fred Eppsteiner is a Dharma teacher (Dharmacharya) in the lineage of Thich Nhat Hanh, has been a student of Buddhism and a practitioner of meditation for over fifty years and has devoted himself to teaching the Dharma (teachings of the Buddha) since 1996.

Born and raised in a secular Jewish household, Fred spent part of his youth engaged in social activism before encountering Buddhism in the late 1960s at the Rochester Zen Center in upstate New York with Philip Kapleau.

Fred met Thich Nhat Hanh in 1975. After befriending Thích Nhất Hạnh, Eppsteiner traveled to India and studied Vajrayana-Dzogchen Buddhism from Tibetan monks. Eppsteiner became a member of the Order of Interbeing in 1983 and served as the editor for two of Thích Nhất Hạnh's books: The Path of Compassion: Writings on Socially Engaged Buddhism and Interbeing: The Fourteen Precepts of Engaged Buddhism, the latter establishing the framework for the Order of Interbeing. In 1994, Eppsteiner received Dharma Transmission from Thich Nhất Hạnh, joining the lineage of the Linji school (Lâm Tế).

Fred lived in Naples, Florida, where he practiced psychotherapy and founded the Naples Community of Mindfulness in 1998. Fred currently serves as the Dharma Teacher of the Florida Community of Mindfulness in Tampa, Florida.

== See also ==
- Timeline of Zen Buddhism in the United States
- Order of Interbeing
