= Fourth Internationalist Tendency =

The Fourth Internationalist Tendency (FIT) was a public faction of the Socialist Workers Party (US), formed after the 1983 expulsion from that organization of a group of supporters of the Fourth International. While the SWP was not formally affiliated with the International for legal reasons, it had until that time been in close political relations with it. At the time of the expulsions, the SWP was starting to withdraw from relationships with the International. The FIT argued for the SWP to rescind their expulsions and to resume its participation in the International. The FIT's books and publications included the Bulletin In Defense of Marxism, a monthly journal of education and discussion which later became the Labor Standard.

After the SWP's 1990 decision to cut its political relationship with the International, the rationale for the FIT to exist as an external faction of the SWP was reduced. The FIT dissolved in the period prior to the 1995 world congress. Most of its activists became members of the Fourth International Caucus inside Solidarity.
